= List of United States Air Force aircraft designations (1919–1962) =

This list of United States Air Force aircraft designations (1919–1962) includes prototype, pre-production and operational type designations under the 1919 and 1924 United States Army Air Service aircraft designation systems, which were used by the United States Air Force and its predecessors until the introduction of the unified United States Tri-Service aircraft designation system in 1962.

For aircraft designations after 1962, see List of United States Tri-Service aircraft designations. For aircraft that did not receive formal designations—including those procured before 1919 when no designation system was in force, and later aircraft that did not receive designations for other reasons—see List of undesignated military aircraft of the United States.

== Prior to 1919 ==
Prior to 1919, all aircraft flown by the Army Air Service were referred to by the designation given to them by their manufacturer. During this period, a variety of both domestic and foreign types were operated, with the latter being the primary front-line types during World War I.

== Army Air Service designations (1919–1924) ==
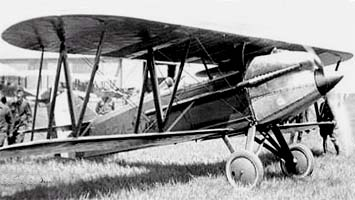
Curtiss PW-8

In September 1919, the Army Air Service decided that it needed an organized designation sequence, and adopted fifteen classifications, designated by Roman numerals. Several other unnumbered designations were added later. Each designation was assigned an abbreviation, and each design a number within that abbreviation. Variants were designated by alphabetically appending letters to the design number.

=== Type O: Foreign-Built Pursuit Aircraft ===
- Fokker D.VII – Fokker
- Fokker D.VIII – Fokker

=== Type I: Pursuit, water-cooled ===
- PW-1 – Engineering Division
- PW-2 – Loening
- PW-3 – Orenco
- PW-4 – Gallaudet
- PW-5 – Fokker
- PW-6 – Fokker
- PW-7 – Fokker
- PW-8 – Curtiss
- PW-9 – Boeing

=== Type II: Pursuit, night ===
- PN-1 – Curtiss

=== Type III: Pursuit, air-cooled ===
- PA-1 – Loening

=== Type IV: Pursuit, ground attack, 1922 ===
- PG-1 – Aeromarine

=== Type V: Two-seat pursuit ===
- TP-1 – Engineering Division

=== Type VI: Ground attack, 1920–1922 ===
- GA-1 – Boeing
- GA-2 – Boeing

=== Type VII: Infantry liaison ===
- IL-1 – Orenco

=== Type VIII: Night observation ===
- NO-1 – Douglas (not built)
- NO-2 – Douglas (not built)

=== Type IX: Artillery observation ===
- AO-1 – Atlantic

=== Type X: Corps observation ===
- CO-1 – Engineering Division
- CO-2 – Engineering Division
- CO-3 – Engineering Division
- CO-4 – Atlantic
- CO-5 – Engineering Division
- CO-6 – Engineering Division
- CO-7 – Boeing
- CO-8 – Atlantic

=== Type XI: Day bombardment ===
- DB-1 – Gallaudet

=== Type XII: Night bombardment, short range ===
- NBS-1 – Martin
- NBS-2 – Lowe-Willard-Fowler
- NBS-3 – Elias
- NBS-4 – Curtiss

=== Type XIII: Night bombardment, long range ===
- NBL-1 – Witteman-Lewis
- NBL-2 – Martin (not built)

=== Type XIV: Trainer, air-cooled ===
- TA-1 – Elias
- TA-2 – Huff-Daland
- TA-3 – Dayton-Wright Aircraft
- TA-4 – Engineering Division
- TA-5 – Dayton-Wright Aircraft
- TA-6 – Huff-Daland

=== Type XV: Trainer, water-cooled ===
- TW-1 – Engineering Division
- TW-2 – Cox-Klemin
- TW-3 – Dayton-Wright Aircraft
- TW-4 – Fokker
- TW-5 – Huff-Daland

=== Ambulance, 1919–1924 ===
- A-1 – Cox-Klemin
- A-2 – Fokker

=== Messenger ===
- M-1 – Engineering Division/Sperry

=== Pursuit, special ===
- PS-1 – Dayton-Wright

=== Racer ===
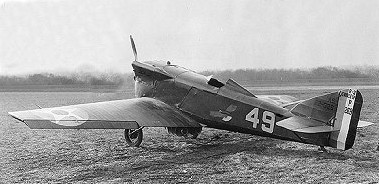
Verville-Sperry R-3

- R-1 – Alfred V. Verville
- R-2 – Thomas-Morse
- R-3 – Verville-Sperry
- R-4 – Loening
- R-5 – Thomas-Morse
- R-6 – Curtiss
- R-7 – Engineering Division
- R-8 – Curtiss

=== Seaplane ===
- S-1 – Loening

=== Transport ===
- T-1 – Martin
- T-2 – Fokker
- T-3 – Lowe-Willard-Fowler

=== Lighter-than-air craft ===
- AC-1 — designed for "long flights and cross-country work", this was a 169 foot long, 180,000 cubic foot buoyancy craft which had one of its earliest long flights in May 1923.
- RN-1 — designated "Zodiac", this was a semi-rigid dirigible, 262.5 feet long with a 360,000 cubic foot buoyancy volume.

== Army Air Corps/Army Air Forces/Air Force designations (1924–1962) ==
=== Amphibian ===
==== OA: Observation Amphibian (1925–1948) ====
- OA-1 – Loening
- OA-2 – Loening
- OA-3 Dolphin – Douglas (redesignated from C-21)
- OA-4 Dolphin – Douglas (redesignated from C-26)
- OA-5 – Douglas
- OA-6 – Consolidated (not built)
- OA-7 – Douglas
- OA-8 – Sikorsky
- OA-9 Goose – Grumman (redesignated A-9 in 1948)
- OA-10 Catalina – Consolidated (redesignated A-10 in 1948)
- OA-11 – Sikorsky
- OA-12 Duck – Grumman (redesignated A-12 in 1948)
- OA-13 Goose – Grumman
- OA-14 Widgeon – Grumman
- OA-15 Seabee – Republic
- OA-16 Albatross – Grumman (redesignated A-16 in 1948)

==== A: Amphibian (1948–1962) ====
- A-9 Goose – Grumman (redesignated from OA-9)
- A-10 Catalina – Consolidated (redesignated from OA-10)
- A-12 Duck – Grumman (redesignated from OA-12)
- A-16 Albatross – Grumman (redesignated from OA-16)

=== Attack ===
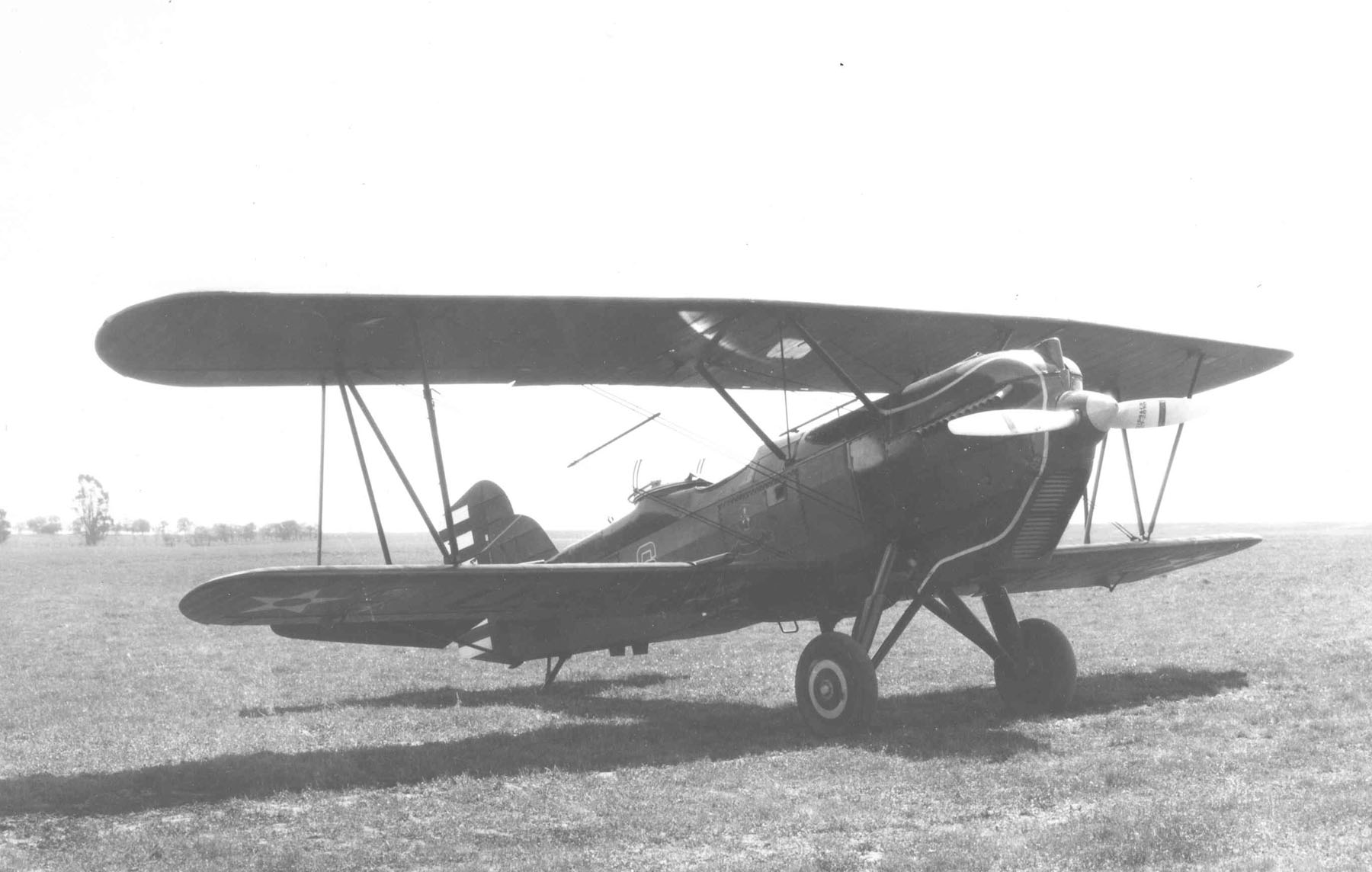
A-3 Falcon

==== A: Attack (1924–1948) ====
- A-1 – skipped to avoid confusion with the Cox-Klemin XA-1
- A-2 – Douglas
- A-3 Falcon – Curtiss
- A-4 Falcon – Curtiss
- A-5 Falcon – Curtiss (not built)
- A-6 Falcon – Curtiss (not built)
- A-7 – Fokker-America
- A-8 – Curtiss
- A-9 – Lockheed
- A-10 Shrike – Curtiss
- A-11 – Consolidated
- A-12 Shrike – Curtiss
- A-13 – Northrop
- A-14 – Curtiss
- A-15 – Martin (not built)
- A-16 – Northrop
- A-17 Nomad – Northrop
- A-18 Shrike – Curtiss
- A-19 – Vultee
- A-20 Havoc – Douglas (redesignated B-20 in 1948)
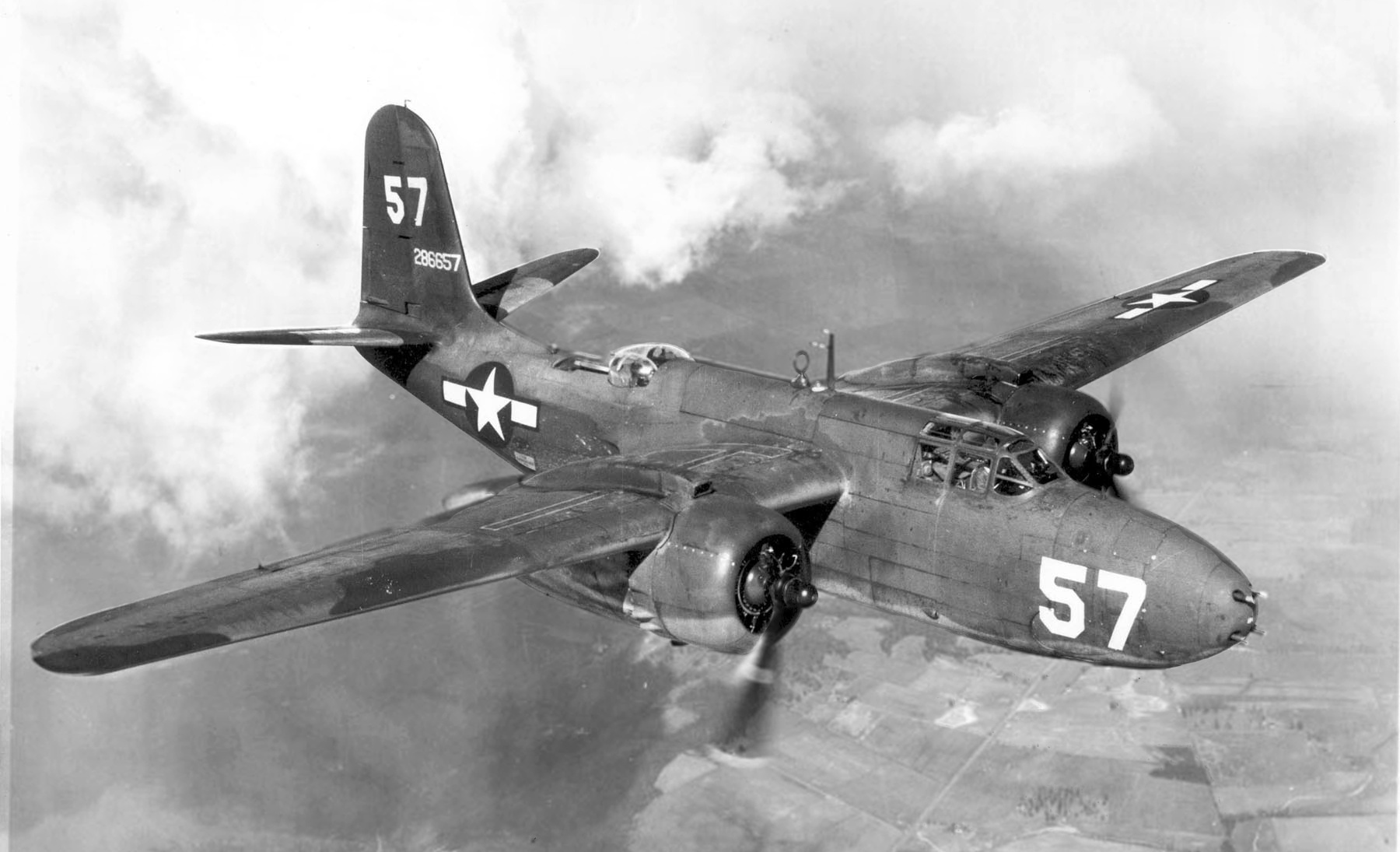
  A-20 Havoc
- A-21 – Stearman
- A-22 – Martin
- A-23 – Martin
- A-24 Banshee – Douglas (Air Force variant of Navy SBD Dauntless, redesignated F-24 in 1948)
- A-25 Shrike – Curtiss (Air Force variant of Navy SB2C Helldiver)
- A-26 Invader – Douglas (redesignated B-26 in 1948)
- A-27 – North American
- A-28 Hudson – Lockheed
- A-29 Hudson – Lockheed
- A-30 – Martin (contract designation for Lend-Lease aircraft)
- A-31 Vengeance – Vultee
- A-32 – Brewster
- A-33 – Douglas
- A-34 – Brewster (Air Force variant of Navy SB2A Buccaneer, issued for Lend-lease)
- A-35 Vengeance – Vultee
- A-36 – North American (ground attack variant of the P-51 Mustang)
- A-37 – Hughes (unofficial designation created for contract purposes)
- A-38 Grizzly – Beechcraft
- A-39 – Kaiser-Fleetwings (not built)
- A-40 – Curtiss (Air Force variant of Navy BTC, not built)
- A-41 – Vultee
- A-42 Mixmaster – Douglas (ground attack variant of the B-42, not built)
- A-43 Blackhawk – Curtiss-Wright (ground attack variant of the F-87, not built)
- A-44 – Convair (redesignated B-53 in 1948, not built)
- A-45 – Martin (redesignated B-51 in 1948)

=== Bomber ===
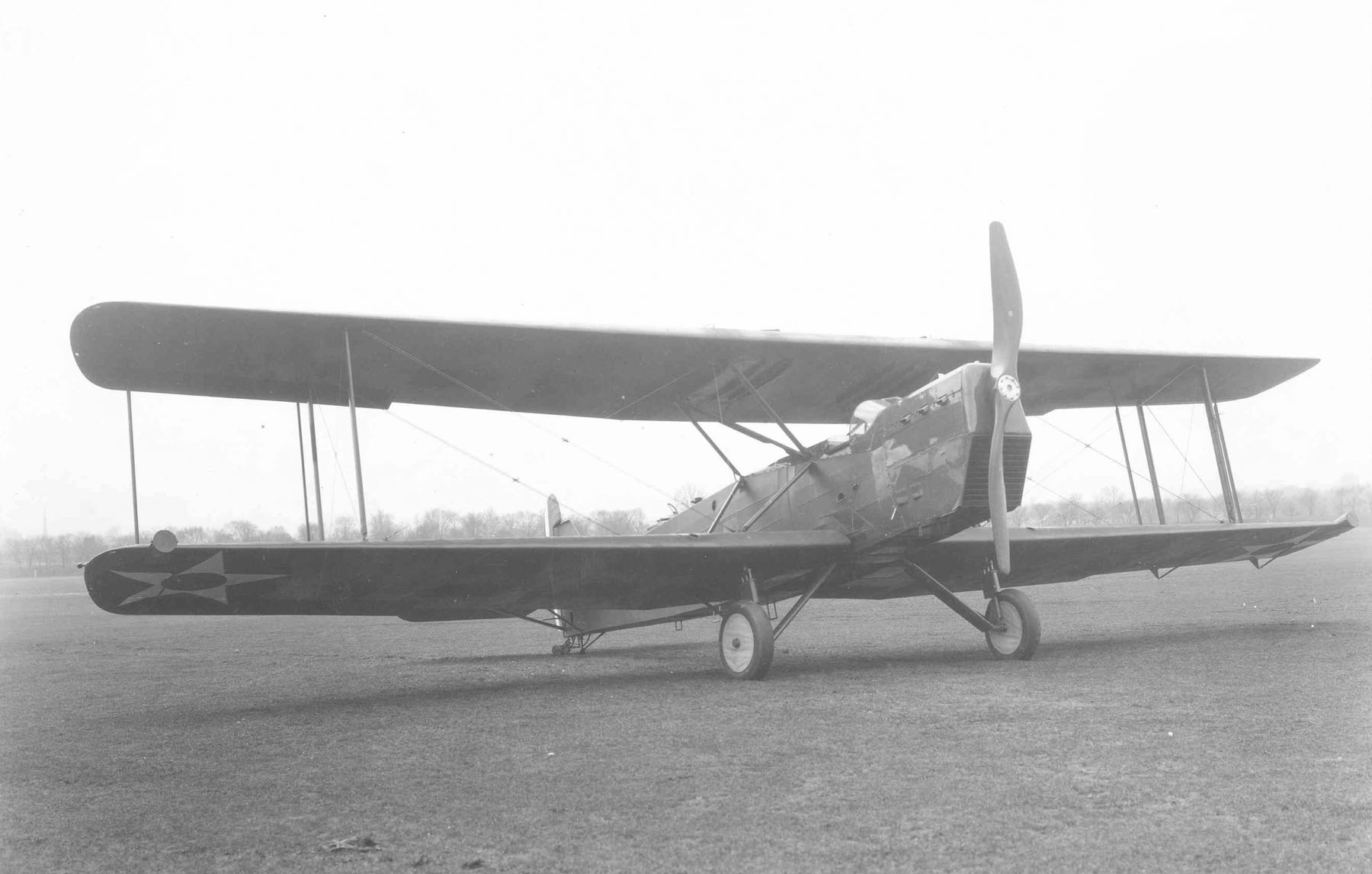
Huff-Daland LB-1

Until 1926, the Army Air Service had three sequences for bombers. Light bombers were indicated by the LB- prefix, medium bombers by the B- prefix, and heavy bombers by the HB- prefix. In 1926, the three-category system was scrapped and all bombers subsequently built were placed in the B- sequence.

==== LB: Light Bomber (1924–1926) ====
- LB-1 – Huff-Daland (later Keystone)
- LB-2 – Atlantic/Fokker
- LB-3 – Keystone
- LB-4 – Martin (not built)
- LB-5 – Keystone
- LB-6 – Keystone
- LB-7 – Keystone
- LB-8 – Keystone
- LB-9 – Keystone
- LB-10 – Keystone (redesignated B-3 in 1930)
- LB-11 – Keystone
- LB-12 – Keystone
- LB-13 – Keystone (redesignated B-4 in 1930)
- LB-14 – Keystone (redesignated B-5 in 1930)

==== B: Medium Bomber (1924–1926) ====
- B-1 – Huff-Daland
- B-2 Condor – Curtiss

==== HB: Heavy Bomber (1924–1926) ====
- HB-1 – Huff-Daland
- HB-2 – Atlantic/Fokker (not built)
- HB-3 – Huff-Daland (not built)

==== B: Bomber (1926–1962) ====
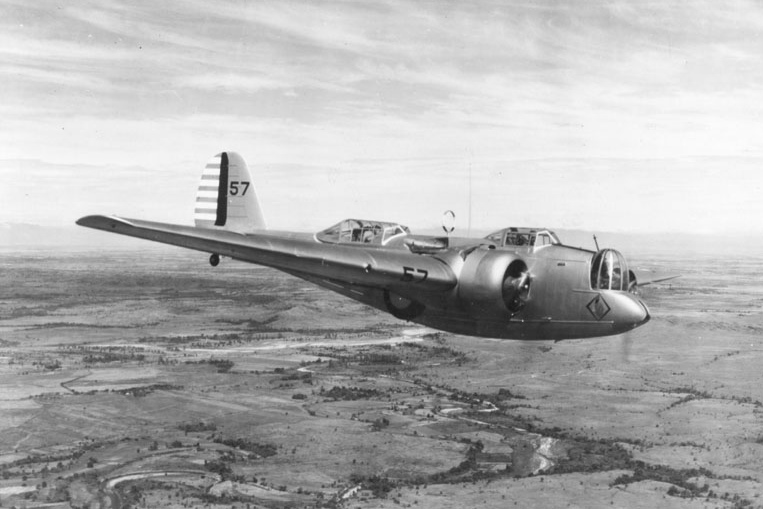
Martin B-10B

- B-1 – Huff-Daland/Keystone
- B-2 Condor – Curtiss
- B-3 – Keystone
- B-4 – Keystone
- B-5 – Keystone
- B-6 – Keystone
- B-7 – Douglas
- B-8 – Fokker
- B-9 – Boeing
- B-10 – Martin
- B-11 – Douglas
- B-12 – Martin
- B-13 – Martin (not built)
- B-14 – Martin
- B-15 – Boeing (redesignated from BLR-1)
- B-16 – Martin (not built)
- B-17 Flying Fortress – Boeing
- B-18 Bolo – Douglas
- B-19 – Douglas (redesignated from BLR-2)
- B-20 – Boeing (not built)
- B-21 – North American
- B-22 – Douglas (not built)
- B-23 Dragon – Douglas
- B-24 Liberator – Consolidated
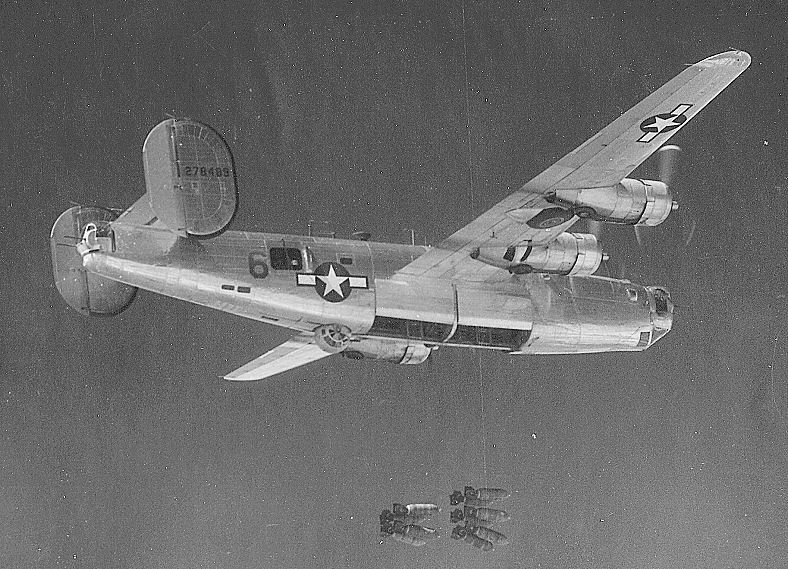
  B-24 Liberator
- B-25 Mitchell – North American
- B-26 Marauder – Martin
- B-27 – Martin (not built)
- B-28 Dragon – North American
- B-29 Superfortress – Boeing
  - B-29D Superfortress – Boeing (redesignated B-50 in 1945)
- B-30 – Lockheed (not built)
- B-31 – Douglas (not built)
- B-32 Dominator – Consolidated
- B-33 Super Marauder – Martin (not built)
- B-34 Lexington – Lockheed
- B-35 – Northrop
- B-36 Peacemaker – Convair
  - B-36G Peacemaker – Convair (redesignated B-60)
- B-37 – Lockheed (redesignated from B-34B)
- B-38 Flying Fortress – Boeing
- B-39 Superfortress – Boeing
- B-40 Flying Fortress – Boeing
- B-41 Liberator – Consolidated
- B-42 Mixmaster – Douglas
- B-43 Jetmaster – Douglas
- B-44 Superfortress – Boeing
- B-45 Tornado – North American
- B-46 – Convair
- B-47 Stratojet – Boeing
  - B-47C Stratojet – Boeing (redesignated B-56, not built)
- B-48 – Martin
- B-49 – Northrop conversion of XB-35 to jet power
- B-50 Superfortress – Boeing (redesignated from B-29D)
  - B-50C Superfortress – Boeing (redesignated B-54, not built)
- B-51 – Martin (redesignated from A-45)
- B-52 Stratofortress – Boeing
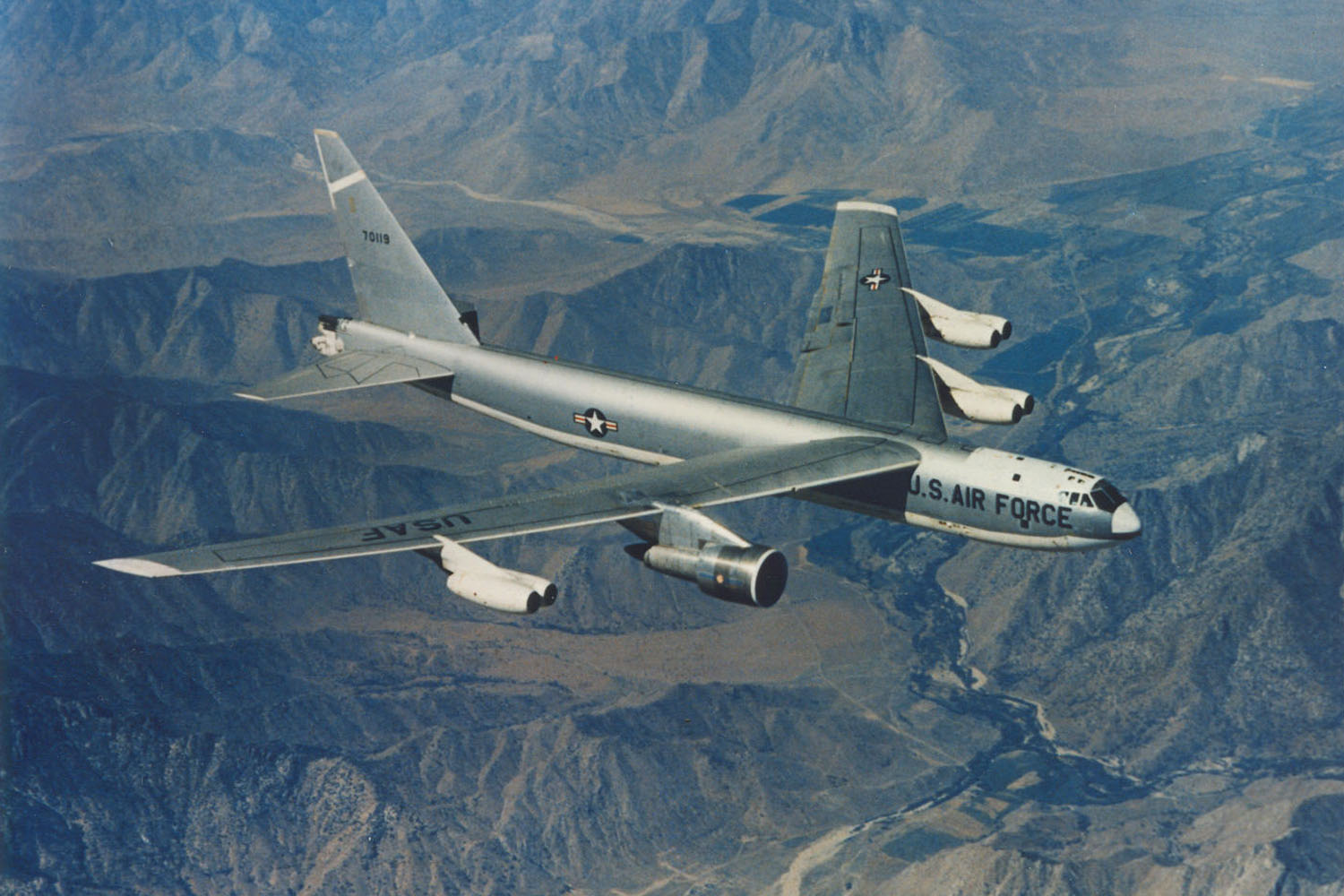
  JB-52E Stratofortress
- B-53 – Convair (not built)
- B-54 – Boeing (redesignated from B-50C)
- B-55 – Boeing (not built)
- B-56 – Boeing (redesignated from B-47C not built)
- B-57 Canberra – Martin
  - B-57D Canberra – Martin
  - B-57F Canberra – Martin/General Dynamics
- B-58 Hustler – Convair
- B-59 – Boeing (not built)
- B-60 – Convair (redesignated from B-36G)
- B-61 Matador – Martin
- B-62 Snark – Northrop
- B-63 RASCAL – Bell
- B-64 Navaho – North American
- B-65 Atlas – Convair
- B-66 Destroyer – Douglas
- B-67 Crossbow – Radioplane
- B-68 – Martin (not built)
- B-68 Titan – Martin (conflicting designation, assigned after the original B-68 was canceled)
- B-69 Neptune – Lockheed (Air Force variant of the Navy P2V)
- B-70 Valkyrie – North American
- B-71 Blackbird – Lockheed (not built)

Beginning with #69, the "M-" (missile) and "B-" (bomber) series diverged. The missiles designated M-69 to M-92, some of which are incorrectly labeled as "formerly designated B-xx" in some sources, never used a "B-" series designation. Beginning with #70, another sequence diverged, the "RS-" (Reconnaissance/Strike) series, which was later changed to the "SR-" (Strategic Reconnaissance) series of the Tri-Service system.

===== Non-sequential =====
Some bomber designations were assigned out of sequence.

- B-20 Havoc – Douglas (redesignated from A-20 in 1948 after original B-20 was canceled)
- B-26 Invader – Douglas (redesignated from A-26 in 1948 after original B-26 was retired)

==== BLR: Bomber, long range (1935–1936) ====
A short-lived designation used from 1935–1936 to refer to three long-range bomber projects commissioned by the Army Air Corps. Most of the bombers were night bombers.

- BLR-1 – Boeing (redesignated to B-15)
- BLR-2 – Douglas (redesignated to B-19)
- BLR-3 – Sikorsky (not built)

=== Cargo ===
==== C: Cargo (1924–1962) ====
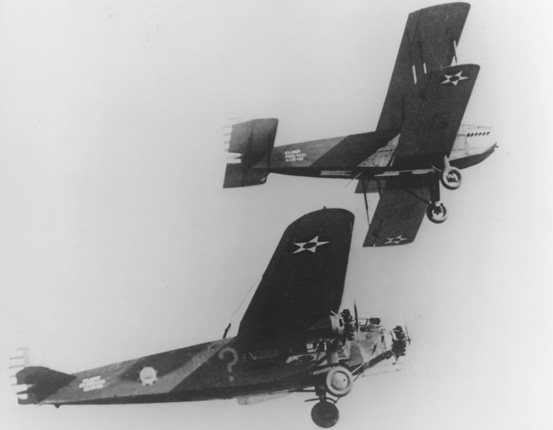
Douglas C-1 refueling Fokker C-2

- C-1 – Douglas
- C-2 – Fokker
- C-3 – Ford
- C-4 – Ford
- C-5 – Fokker
- C-6 – Sikorsky
- C-7 – Fokker
- C-8 – Fairchild
- C-9 – Ford
- C-10 Robin – Curtiss-Wright
- C-11 Fleetster – Consolidated
- C-12 Vega – Lockheed
- C-13 – skipped
- C-14 – Fokker
- C-15 – Fokker
- C-16 – Fokker
- C-17 Super Vega – Lockheed
- C-18 Monomail – Boeing
- C-19 Alpha – Northrop
- C-20 – Fokker
- C-21 Dolphin – Douglas (redesignated to OA-3)
- C-22 Fleetster – Consolidated
- C-23 Altair – Lockheed
- C-24 – Fairchild
- C-25 Altair – Lockheed
- C-26 Dolphin – Douglas (redesignated to OA-3)
- C-27 Airbus – Bellanca
- C-28 – Sikorsky
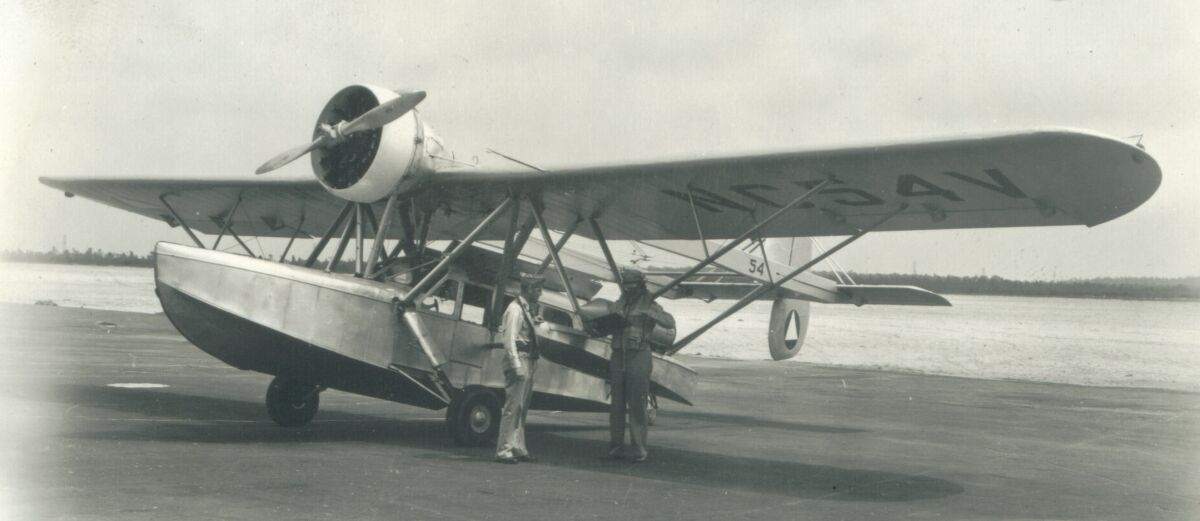
  Sikorsky C-28
- C-29 Dolphin – Douglas
- C-30 Condor – Curtiss-Wright
- C-31 – Kreider-Reisner
- C-32 – Douglas
- C-33 – Douglas
- C-34 – Douglas
- C-35 – Lockheed
- C-36 Electra – Lockheed
- C-37 Electra – Lockheed
- C-38 – Douglas
- C-39 – Douglas
- C-40 Electra – Lockheed
- C-41 – Douglas
  - C-41A – Douglas
- C-42 – Douglas
- C-43 Traveller – Beechcraft
- C-44 – Messerschmitt
- C-45 Expeditor – Beechcraft
- C-46 Commando – Curtiss-Wright
- C-47 Skytrain – Douglas
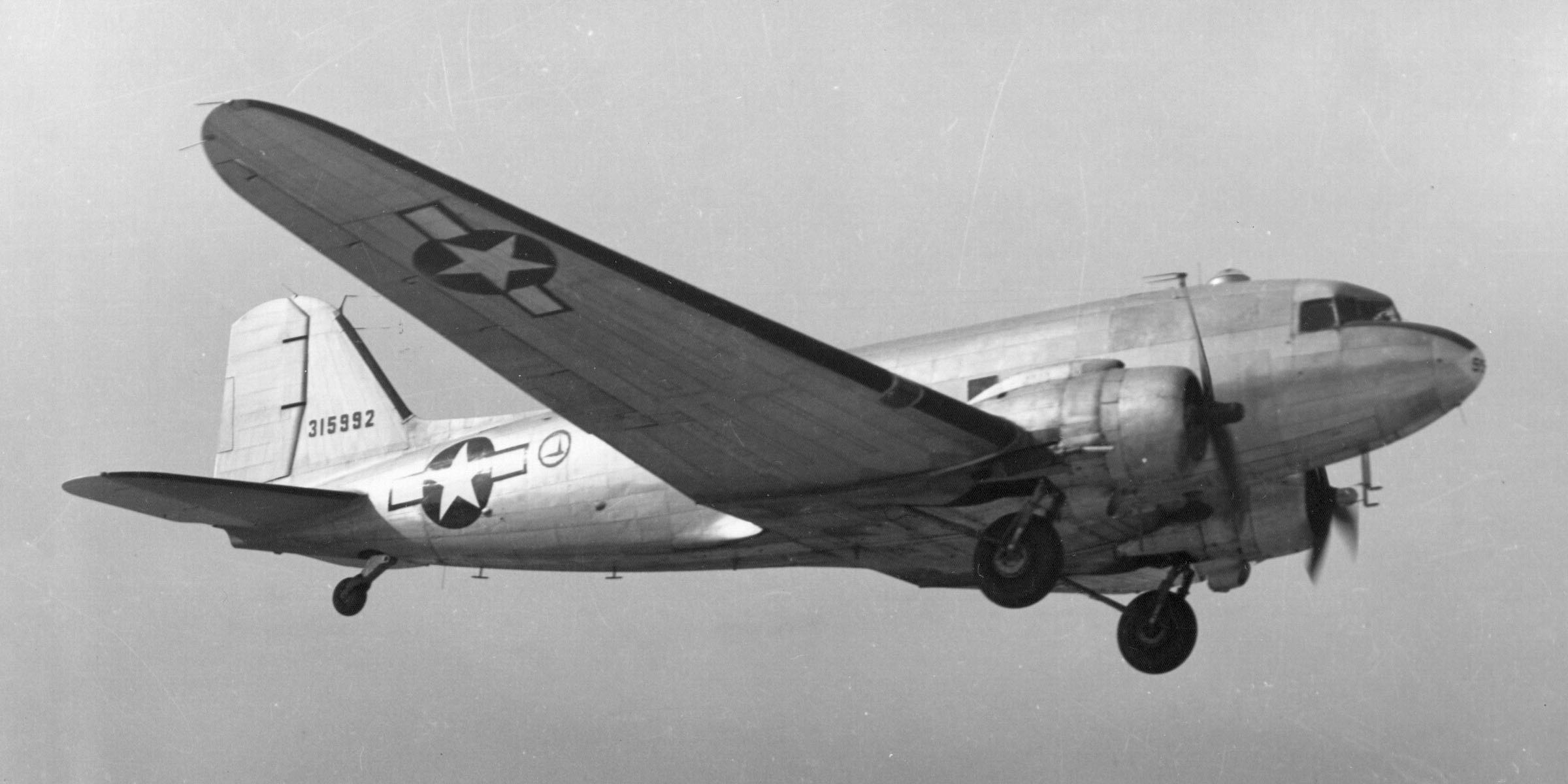
  C-47 Skytrain
  - C-47F Skytrain – Douglas (redesignated from C-129)
  - AC-47 Spooky – Douglas
- C-48 Skytrain – Douglas
- C-49 Skytrain – Douglas
- C-50 Skytrain – Douglas
- C-51 Skytrain – Douglas
- C-52 Skytrain – Douglas
- C-53 Skytrooper – Douglas
- C-54 Skymaster – Douglas
- C-55 Commando – Curtiss-Wright
- C-56 Lodestar – Lockheed
- C-57 Lodestar – Lockheed
- C-58 Bolo – Douglas
- C-59 Lodestar – Lockheed
- C-60 Lodestar – Lockheed
- C-61 Forwarder – Fairchild
- C-62 – Waco
- C-63 Hudson – Lockheed
- C-64 Norseman – Noorduyn
- C-65 Skycar – Stout
- C-66 Lodestar – Lockheed
- C-67 Dragon – Douglas
- C-68 – Douglas
- C-69 Constellation – Lockheed
- C-70 Nightingale – Howard
  - C-70B Nightingale – Howard
- C-71 Executive – Spartan
- C-72 – Waco
- C-73 – Boeing
- C-74 Globemaster – Douglas
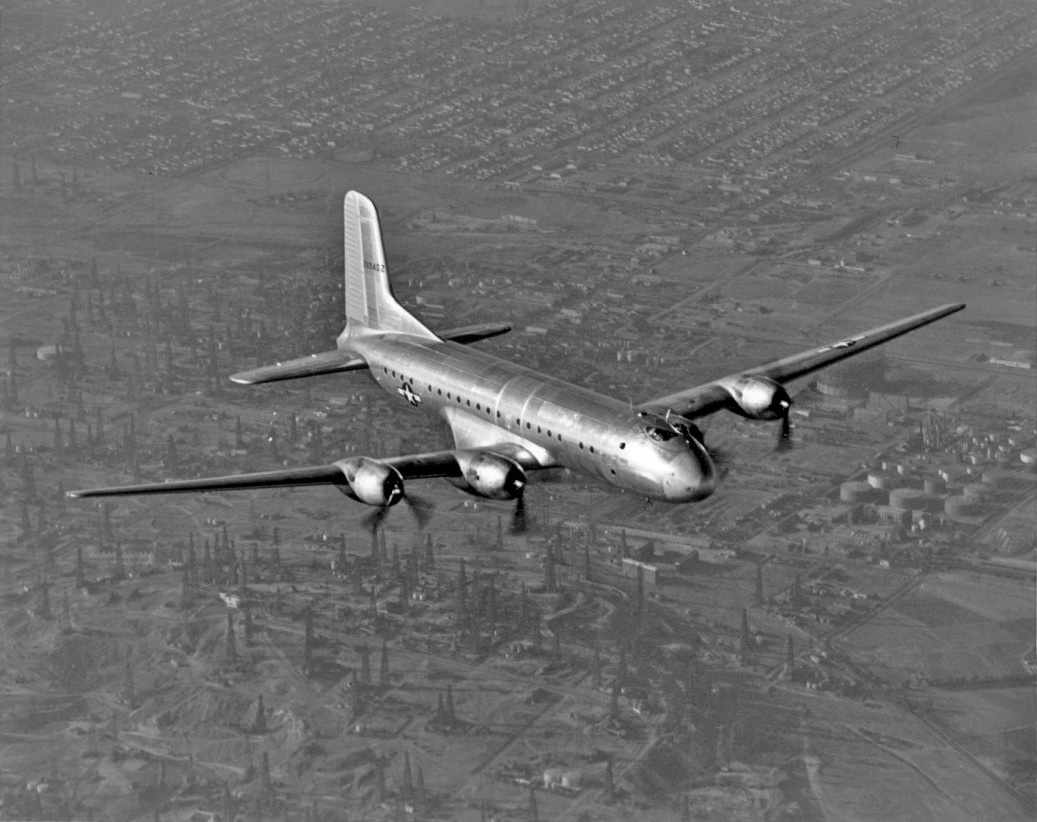
  C-74 Globemaster
- C-75 – Boeing
- C-76 Caravan – Curtiss-Wright
- C-77 – Cessna
  - C-77B/C/D – Cessna
- C-78 Bobcat – Cessna
- C-79 – Junkers
- C-80 – Harlow
- C-81 Reliant – Stinson
- C-82 Packet – Fairchild
- C-83 Coupe – Piper
  - C-83A – Piper (redesignated L-4C)
  - C-83B – Piper
- C-84 – Douglas
- C-85 Orion – Lockheed
- C-86 Forwarder – Fairchild
- C-87 Liberator Express – Consolidated
- C-88 – Fairchild
- C-89 – Hamilton
- C-90 – Luscombe
- C-91 – Stinson
- C-92 – Akron-Funk
- C-93 Conestoga – Budd
- C-94 – Cessna
- C-95 Grasshopper – Taylorcraft
- C-96 – Fairchild
- C-97 Stratofreighter – Boeing
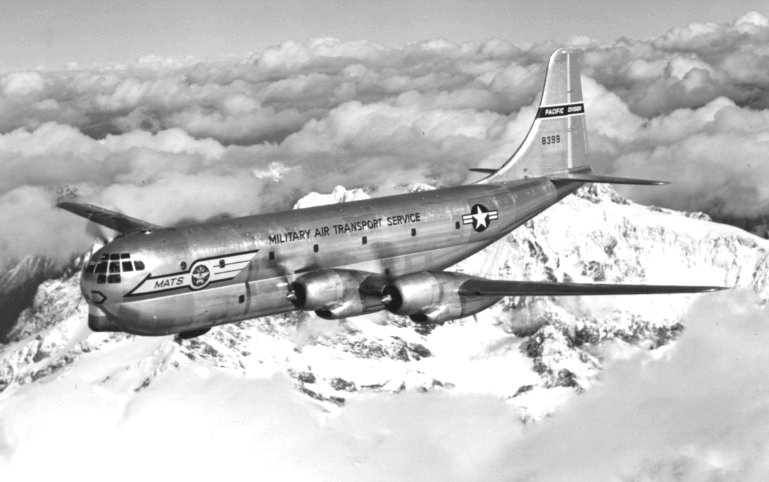
  C-97 Stratofreighter
  - KC-97 Stratofreighter – Boeing
- C-98 Clipper – Boeing
- C-99 – Convair
- C-100 Gamma – Northrop
- C-101 Vega – Lockheed
- C-102 Sportster – Rearwin
- C-103 – Grumman
- C-104 – Lockheed
- C-105 – Boeing
- C-106 Loadmaster – Cessna
- C-107 Skycar – Stout
- C-108 Flying Fortress – Boeing
- C-109 Liberator Express – Consolidated
- C-110 – Douglas
- C-111 Super Electra – Lockheed
- C-112 – Douglas
- C-113 Commando – Curtiss-Wright
- C-114 Skymaster – Douglas
- C-115 Skymaster – Douglas (not built)
- C-116 Skymaster – Douglas
- C-117 Super Skytrain – Douglas
  - C-117D Super Skytrain – Douglas (redesignated from Navy R4D-8 in 1962)
- C-118 Liftmaster – Douglas
- C-119 Flying Boxcar – Fairchild
  - AC-119 – Fairchild
- C-120 Packplane – Fairchild
- C-121 Constellation – Lockheed
  - C-121F Constellation – Lockheed
- C-122 Avitruc – Chase
- C-123 Provider – Fairchild
  - C-123A – Chase
- C-124 Globemaster II – Douglas
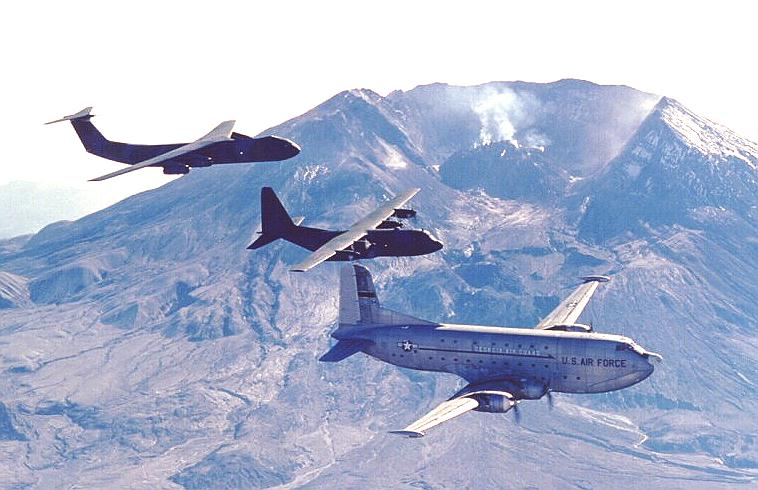
  From left to right: C-141, C-130, and C-124 with Mount St. Helens in the background
- C-125 Raider – Northrop
- C-126 – Cessna
- C-127 Beaver – de Havilland Canada (redesignated to L-20)
- C-127 – Douglas (conflicting designation, assigned after original C-127 was redesignated)
- C-128 Flying Boxcar – Fairchild (not built)
- C-129 Super Skytrain – Douglas (redesignated to C-47F)
- C-130 Hercules – Lockheed
  - C-130J Super Hercules – Lockheed Martin
  - AC-130 – Lockheed
  - DC-130 Hercules – Lockheed
  - EC-130 – Lockheed
    - EC-130H Compass Call – Lockheed
  - HC-130 – Lockheed
  - KC-130 Hercules – Lockheed
  - LC-130 Hercules – Lockheed
  - MC-130 – Lockheed
  - RC-130 Hercules – Lockheed
  - WC-130 Hercules – Lockheed
- C-131 Samaritan – Convair
  - NC-131H Samaritan – Convair
- C-132 – Douglas (not built)
- C-133 Cargomaster – Douglas
- C-134 – Stroukoff
- C-135 Stratolifter – Boeing
  - KC-135 Stratotanker – Boeing
- C-136 – Fairchild
- C-137 Stratofreighter – Boeing (redesignated C-97J)
- C-137 Otter – de Havilland Canada (conflicting designation, assigned after the original C-137 was redesignated) (redesignated U-1)
- C-137 Stratoliner – Boeing (conflicting designation, assigned after the original C-137s were redesignated)
- C-138 – reserved for Fokker F27, but never assigned
- C-139 – reserved for Lockheed P2V Neptune, but never assigned
- C-140 Jetstar – Lockheed
- C-141 Starlifter – Lockheed
- C-142 – Vought
- C-143 – reserved for what would become the X-19, but never officially assigned and later reused in the Tri-Service system

This sequence was restarted at C-1 with the introduction of the Tri-Service system. However, the original sequence was picked up at C-143 starting in 2005, leading to the US military maintaining two separate sequences for cargo aircraft.

=== Drone ===
==== Aerial Target ====
===== GL: Target Glider (1922–1935) =====
- GL-1 – McCook Field
- GL-2 – McCook Field
- GL-3 – McCook Field (incorrectly known as "G-3")

===== A: Aerial Target (1940–1941) =====
- A-1 – Fleetwings
- A-2 – Radioplane
- A-3 – Curtiss
- A-4 – Douglas
- A-5 – Boeing (not built)
- A-6 – Douglas (not built)
- A-7 Airacobra – Bell
- A-8 Cadet – Culver (redesignated PQ-8 in 1941)

===== PQ: Aerial Target, man carrying (1943–1948) =====
- PQ-8 Cadet – Culver (redesignated from A-8, redesignated Q-8 in 1948)
- PQ-9 Cadet – Culver
- PQ-10 – Culver (not built)
- PQ-11 – Fletcher (not built)
- PQ-12 – Fleetwings
- PQ-13 – ERCO
- PQ-14 Cadet – Culver (redesignated Q-14)
- PQ-15 – Culver

===== OQ: Aerial Target, model airplane (1942–1948) =====
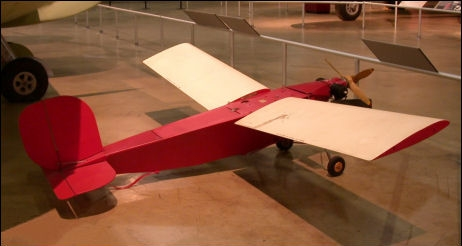
Radioplane OQ-2A

- OQ-1 – skipped
- OQ-2 – Radioplane
- OQ-3 – Radioplane
- OQ-4 – Brunswick-Balke-Collender
- OQ-5 – unknown contractor (not built)
- OQ-6 – Radioplane
- OQ-7 – Radioplane
- OQ-8 – skipped
- OQ-9 – skipped
- OQ-10 – skipped
- OQ-11 – Simmonds Aerocessories
- OQ-12 – Radioplane
- OQ-13 – Radioplane
- OQ-14 – Radioplane
- OQ-15 – USAAF
- OQ-16 – Frankfort (not built)
- OQ-17 – Radioplane
- OQ-18 – unknown contractor
- OQ-19 – Radioplane

==== BQ: Controllable Bomb (1942–1945) ====
- BQ-1 – Fleetwings
- BQ-2 – Kaiser-Fleetwings
- BQ-3 – Fairchild
- BQ-4 – Interstate
- BQ-5 – Interstate (not built)
- BQ-6 – Interstate (not built)
- BQ-7 Flying Fortress – Boeing
- BQ-8 Liberator – Consolidated

==== CQ: Target Control (1942–1948) ====
- CQ-1 – Fletcher
- CQ-2 – Stinson
- CQ-3 Expeditor – Beechcraft
- CQ-4 Flying Fortress – Boeing

==== Q: Drone (1948–1962) ====
- Q-1 – Radioplane
- Q-2 Firebee – Ryan
- Q-3 – Radioplane (not built)
- Q-4 – Northrop
- Q-5 Kingfisher – Lockheed
- Q-6 – WADC
- Q-7 – skipped, request for redesignation of QB-17 not approved
- Q-8 Cadet – Culver (redesignated from PQ-8)
  - Q-8 – request for redesignation of QF-80 not approved
- Q-9 – WADC
- Q-10 – Radioplane
- Q-11 – WADC (not built)
- Q-12 – Beechcraft
- Q-13 – skipped
- Q-14 Cadet – Culver (redesignated from PQ-14)

=== Experimental ===
==== S: Supersonic/Special Test (1946–1948) ====
The USAF established a separate sequence for purpose-built research aircraft in 1946. Originally designated with the "S" mission letter, the sequence switched to "X" in 1948.

- S-1 – Bell (redesignated X-1 in 1948)
- S-2 – Bell (redesignated X-2 in 1948)
- S-3 Stiletto – Douglas (redesignated X-3 in 1948)
- S-4 Bantam – Northrop (redesignated X-4 in 1948)
- S-5 – Bell (redesignated X-5 in 1948)

==== X: Special Research/Experimental (1948–1962) ====
Below is a list of "X-planes" designated before 1962. For a list of X-planes designated after 1962, see List of United States Tri-Service aircraft designations § X: Special research.

- X-1 – Bell (redesignated from S-1)
- X-2 – Bell (redesignated from S-2)
- X-3 Stiletto – Douglas (redesignated from S-3)
- X-4 Bantam – Northrop (redesignated from S-4)
- X-5 – Bell (redesignated from S-5)
- X-6 – Convair (not built)
- X-7 – Lockheed
- X-8 – Aerojet
- X-9 Shrike – Bell
- X-10 – North American
- X-11 – Convair
- X-12 – Convair
- X-13 Vertijet – Ryan
- X-14 – Bell
- X-15 – North American
- X-16 – Bell (not built)
- X-17 – Lockheed
- X-18 – Hiller
- X-19 – Curtiss-Wright
- X-20 Dyna-Soar – Boeing (not built)

=== Fighter ===
==== P: Pursuit (1924-1948) ====
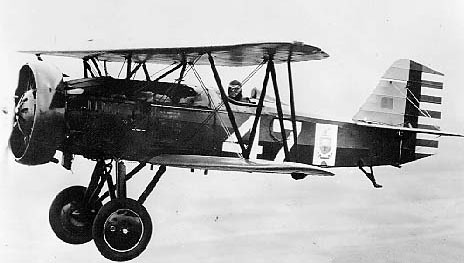
P-3 Hawk

Designated P- for "pursuit" until June 1948, nine months after the United States Air Force was founded. After this, all P- designations were changed to F- ("fighter"), but the original design numbers were retained.

- P-1 Hawk – Curtiss
- P-2 Hawk – Curtiss
- P-3 Hawk – Curtiss
- P-4 Hawk – Curtiss
- P-4 – Boeing (conflicting designation)
- P-5 Hawk – Curtiss
- P-6 Hawk – Curtiss
- P-7 – Boeing
- P-8 – Boeing
- P-9 – Boeing
- P-10 – Curtiss
- P-11 Hawk – Curtiss
- P-12 – Boeing
- P-13 Viper – Thomas-Morse
- P-14 – Curtiss (not built)
- P-15 – Boeing
- P-16 – Berliner-Joyce (redesignated PB-1)
- P-17 Hawk – Curtiss
- P-18 – Curtiss (not built)
- P-19 – Curtiss (not built)
- P-20 – Curtiss
- P-21 – Curtiss
- P-22 Hawk – Curtiss
- P-23 Hawk – Curtiss
- P-24 – Lockheed
- P-25 – Consolidated
- P-26 Peashooter – Boeing
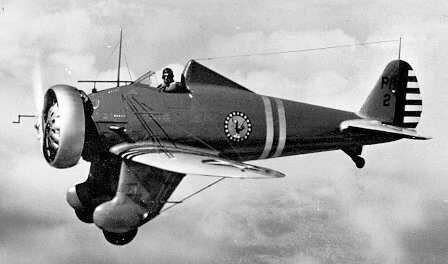
  Boeing P-26
- P-27 – Consolidated (not built)
- P-28 – Consolidated (not built)
- P-29 – Boeing
- P-30 – Consolidated (redesignated PB-2)
- P-31 Swift – Curtiss
- P-32 – Boeing
- P-33 – Consolidated (not built)
- P-34 – Wedell-Williams (not built)
- P-35 – Seversky
- P-36 Hawk – Curtiss
- P-37 – Curtiss
- P-38 Lightning – Lockheed
- P-39 Airacobra – Bell
  - P-39E Airacobra – Bell
- P-40 Warhawk – Curtiss
- P-41 – Seversky
- P-42 – Curtiss
- P-43 Lancer – Republic
- P-44 Rocket – Republic (not built)
- P-45 – Bell (redesignated P-39C)
- P-46 – Curtiss
- P-47 Thunderbolt – Republic
- P-48 – Douglas (not built)
- P-49 – Lockheed
- P-50 – Grumman
- P-51 Mustang – North American
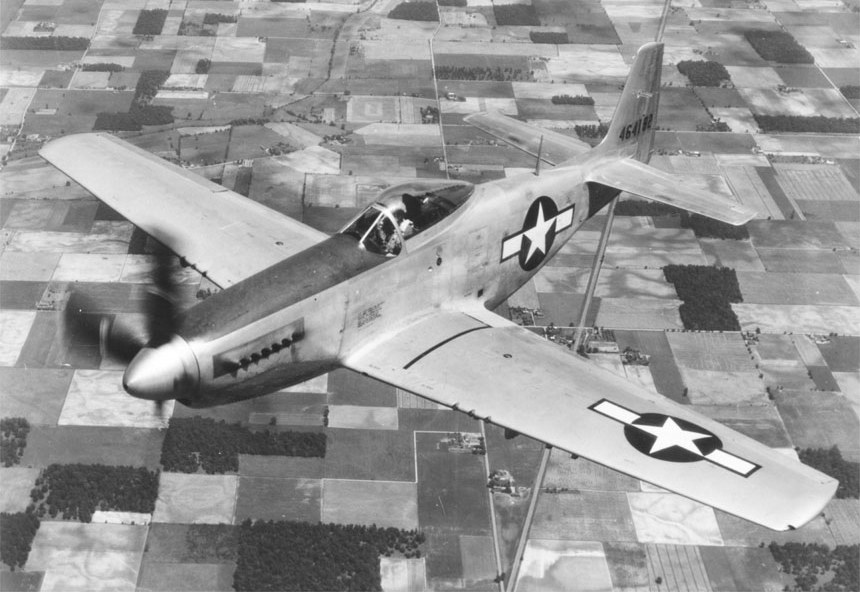
  P-51H Mustang
- P-52 – Bell (not built)
- P-53 – Curtiss (not built)
- P-54 – Vultee
- P-55 Ascender – Curtiss
- P-56 Black Bullet – Northrop
- P-57 Peashooter – Tucker (not built)
- P-58 Chain Lightning – Lockheed
- P-59 – Bell (not built)
- P-59 Airacomet – Bell (conflicting designation, assigned after the original P-59 was canceled)
- P-60 – Curtiss
- P-61 Black Widow – Northrop
- P-62 – Curtiss
- P-63 Kingcobra – Bell
- P-64 – North American
- P-65 – Grumman (not built)
- P-66 Vanguard – Vultee
- P-67 Bat – McDonnell
- P-68 Tornado – Vultee (not built)
- P-69 – Republic (not built)
- P-70 Nighthawk – Douglas
- P-71 – Curtiss (not built)
- P-72 – Republic
- P-73 – Hughes (unofficial designation created for contract purposes)
- P-74 – skipped
- P-75 Eagle – Fisher
- P-76 – Bell
- P-77 – Bell
- P-78 – North American (redesignated P-51B)
- P-79 – Northrop
- P-80 Shooting Star – Lockheed
- P-81 – Convair
- P-82 Twin Mustang – North American
- P-83 – Bell
- P-84 Thunderjet – Republic
- P-85 Goblin – McDonnell
- P-86 Sabre – North American
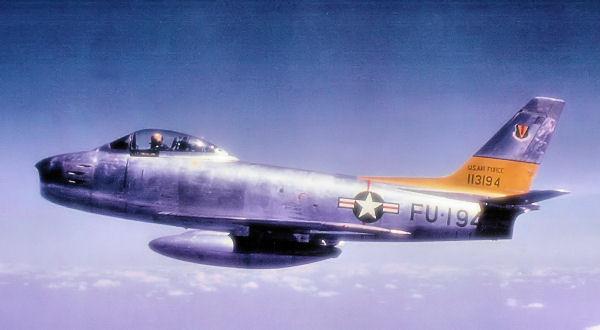
  F-86F Sabre
- P-87 Blackhawk – Curtiss
- P-88 Voodoo – McDonnell
- P-89 Scorpion – Northrop
- P-90 – Lockheed
- P-91 Thunderceptor – Republic
- P-92 – Convair

===== Non-sequential =====
- P-322 Lightning – Lockheed (designation of rejected Royal Air Force Lightning Mk Is in USAAF service)
- P-400 Airacobra – Bell (designation of former RAF Airacobra Mk Is in USAAF service)

==== F: Fighter (1948–1962) ====
All fighters from F-38 to F-92 originally carried the pursuit designations from P-38 to P-92, unless otherwise noted.

- F-38 Lightning – Lockheed
- F-39 Airacobra – Bell
- F-40 Warhawk – Curtiss
- F-47 Thunderbolt – Republic
- F-51 Mustang – North American
- F-61 Black Widow – Northrop
  - RF-61C Reporter – Northrop (redesignated from F-15)
- F-63 Kingcobra – Bell
- F-80 Shooting Star – Lockheed
- F-81 – Convair
- F-82 Twin Mustang – North American
- F-83 – Bell
- F-84 Thunderjet – Republic
  - F-84F Thunderstreak – Republic (redesignated from F-96)
  - F-84H Thunderscreech – Republic (redesignated from first F-106)
- F-85 Goblin – McDonnell
- F-86 Sabre – North American
  - F-86C Sabre – North American (redesignated to F-93)
  - F-86D/G/K/L Sabre – North American (redesignated from F-95)
- F-87 Blackhawk – Curtiss
- F-88 Voodoo – McDonnell
- F-89 Scorpion – Northrop
- F-90 – Lockheed
- F-91 Thunderceptor – Republic
- F-92 – Convair
- F-93 – North American (redesignated from F-86C)
- F-94 Starfire – Lockheed
- F-95 – North American (redesignated to F-86D)
- F-96 – Republic (redesignated to F-84F)
- F-97 Starfire – Lockheed (redesignated to F-94C)
- F-98 Falcon – Hughes
- F-99 BOMARC – Boeing
- F-100 Super Sabre – North American
  - F-100B Super Sabre – North American (redesignated to F-107)
- F-101 Voodoo – McDonnell
- F-102 Delta Dagger – Convair
  - F-102B Delta Dagger – Convair (redesignated to F-106)
- F-103 – Republic
- F-104 Starfighter – Lockheed
  - XF-104 Starfighter – Lockheed
  - NF-104A Starfighter – Lockheed
- F-105 Thunderchief – Republic
- F-106 Thunderscreech – Republic (redesignated to F-84H)
- F-106 Delta Dart – Convair (conflicting designation, redesignated from F-102B after the original F-106 was redesignated to F-84H)
- F-107 – North American (redesignated from F-100B)
- F-108 Rapier – North American (not built)
- F-109 – designation was reserved for the F-101B and Bell D-188A, but never officially assigned
- F-110 Spectre – McDonnell Douglas (redesignated and renamed to F-4 Phantom II in 1962)
- F-111 Aardvark – General Dynamics
  - F-111B Aardvark – General Dynamics/Grumman
  - F-111C - General Dynamics (export only)
  - F-111K - General Dynamics (export only, not built)
  - EF-111A Raven – General Dynamics/Grumman
  - AFTI/F-111A Aardvark – General Dynamics/Boeing
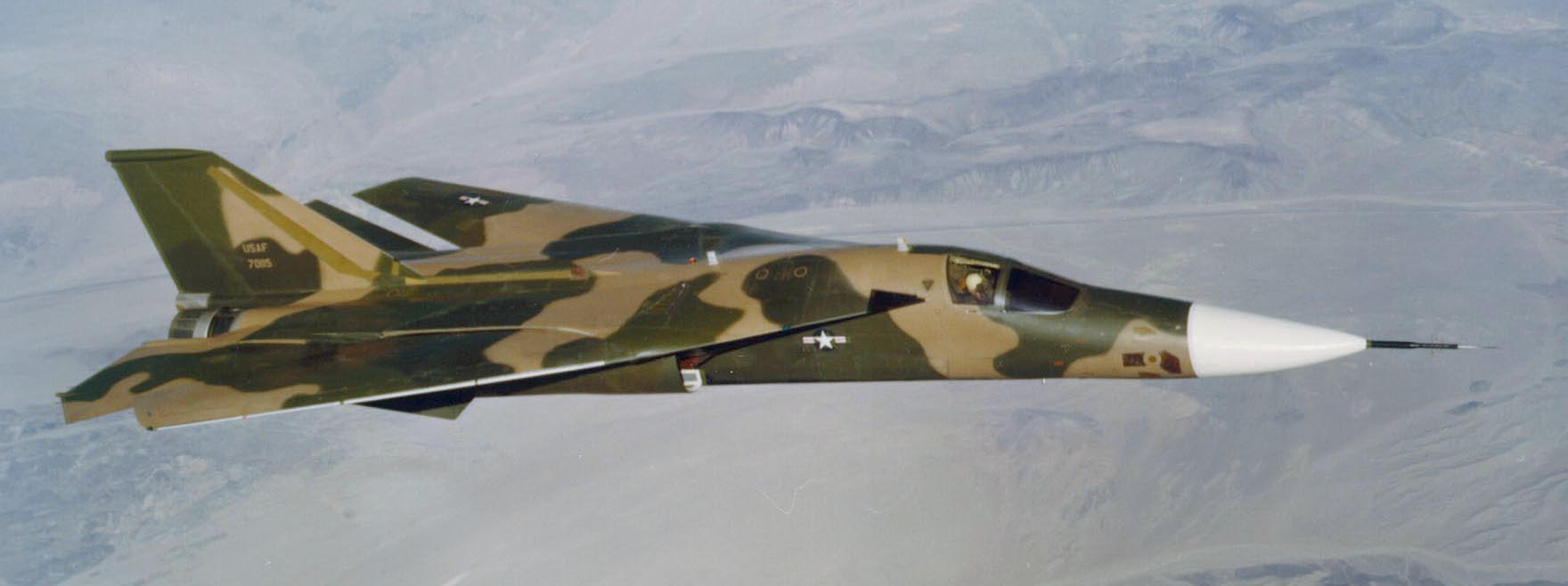
    General Dynamics F-111

Unofficial designations YF-112 and up were later assigned to black projects.

===== Non-sequential =====
- F-24 Banshee – Douglas (redesignated from A-24 in 1948)

==== FM: Fighter, Multiplace ====
- FM-1 Airacuda – Bell
- FM-2 – Lockheed (redesignated from PB-3, not built)

==== PB: Pursuit, Biplace ====
- PB-1 – Berliner-Joyce (redesignated from P-16)
- PB-2 – Consolidated (redesignated from P-30)
- PB-3 – Lockheed (redesignated FM-2, not built)

=== Glider ===
==== AG: Assault Glider (1942–1944) ====
- AG-1 – Christopher (not built)
- AG-2 – Timm (not built)

==== BG: Bomb Glider (1942–1944) ====
- BG-1 – Fletcher
- BG-2 – Fletcher (not built)
- BG-3 – Cornelius (not built)

==== CG: Cargo Glider (1941–1948) ====
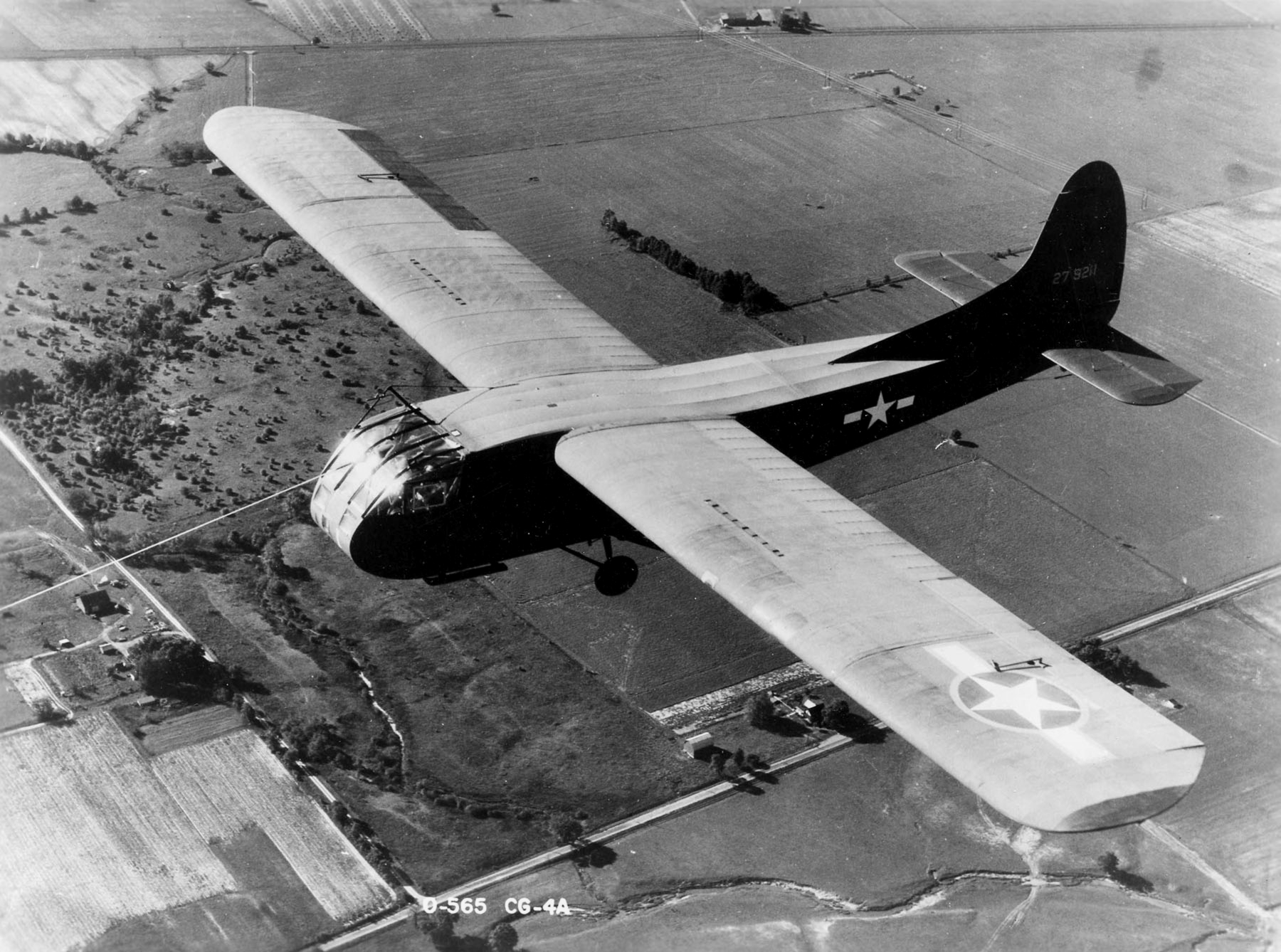
Waco CG-4A

- CG-1 – Frankfort (not built)
- CG-2 – Frankfort (not built)
- CG-3 – Waco
- CG-4 Hadrian – Waco
- CG-5 – St. Louis
- CG-6 – St. Louis (not built)
- CG-7 – Bowlus
- CG-8 – Bowlus
- CG-9 – AGA Aviation
- CG-10 Trojan Horse – Laister-Kauffman
- CG-11 – Snead (not built)
- CG-12 – Read-York
- CG-13 – Waco
- CG-14 – Chase
- CG-15 Hadrian – Waco
- CG-16 – General Airborne Transport
- CG-17 – Douglas
- CG-18 – Chase
- CG-19 – Douglas (not built)
- CG-20 – Chase

==== FG: Fuel Glider (1930–1948) ====
- FG-1 – Cornelius

==== PG: Powered Glider (1943–1948) ====
- PG-1 – Northwestern
- PG-2 – Ridgefield (redesignated G-2 in 1948)
- PG-3 – Waco (redesignated G-3 in 1948)

==== TG: Training Glider (1941–1948) ====
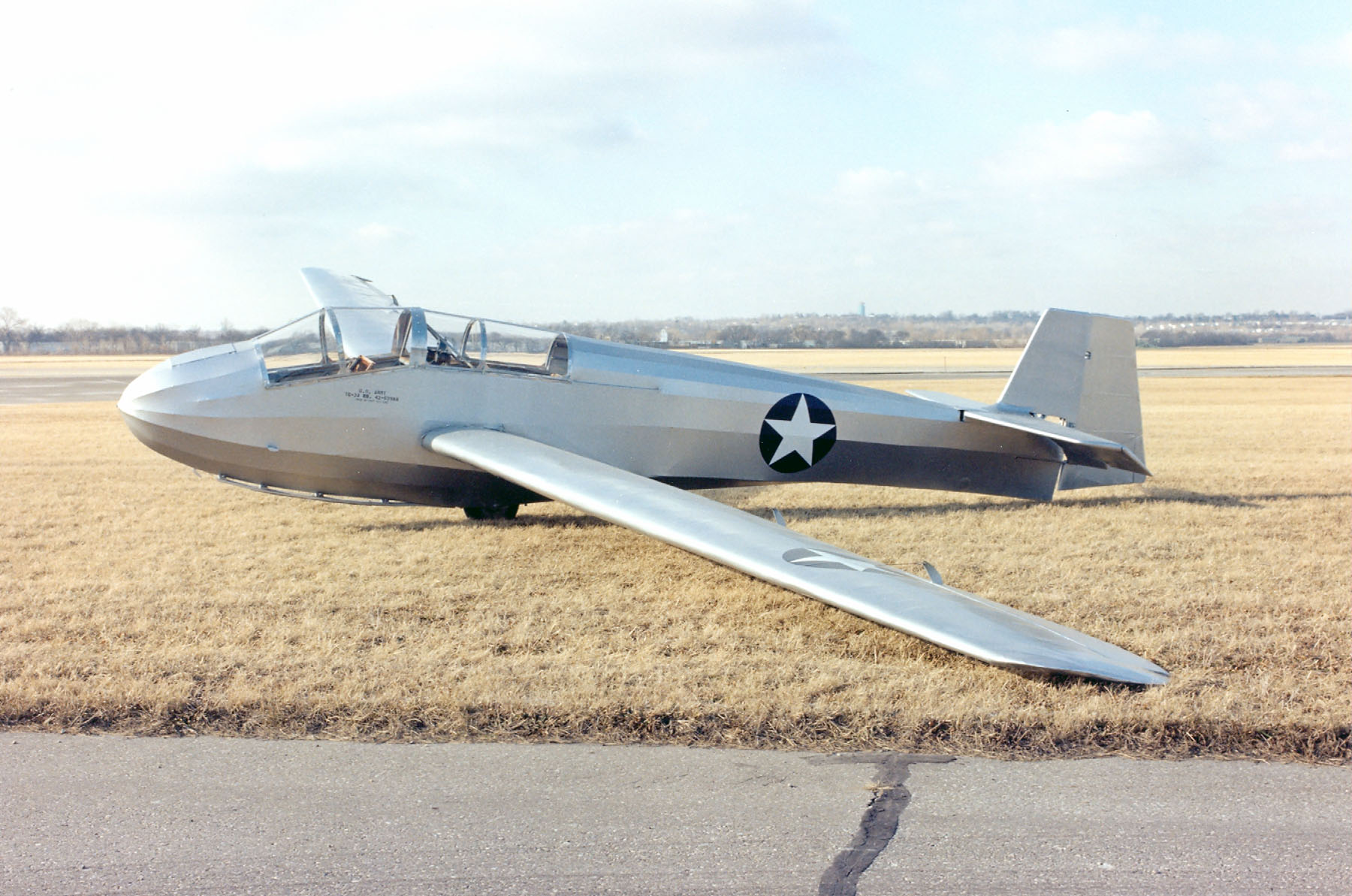
Schweitzer TG-3A

- TG-1 – Frankfort
- TG-2 – Schweizer
- TG-3 – Schweizer
- TG-4 – Laister-Kauffman
- TG-5 Grasshopper – Aeronca
- TG-6 Grasshopper – Taylorcraft
- TG-7 Orlik – Warsztaty Szybowcowe
- TG-8 Grasshopper – Piper
- TG-9 – Sailplane Corporation of America
- TG-10 – Wichita Engineering (not built)
- TG-11 – Schempp-Hirth
- TG-12 – Bowlus (not built)
- TG-13 – Sailplane Corporation of America
- TG-14 – Stiglmeier
- TG-15 – Franklin
- TG-16 – Schultz
- TG-17 – Franklin
- TG-18 – Midwest Sailplane
- TG-19 – DFS
- TG-20 – Schempp-Hirth
- TG-21 – Notre Dame
- TG-22 – Mehlhose
- TG-23 – Harper-Corcoran
- TG-24 – Schempp-Hirth
- TG-25 Plover – Wolcott
- TG-26 – Universal
- TG-27 – Schneider
- TG-28 Hawk Junior – Haller
- TG-29 – Volmer Jensen
- TG-30 Bluebird – Smith
- TG-31 – Aero Industries
- TG-32 – Pratt-Read
- TG-33 – Aeronca

==== G: Glider (1948–1955) ====
In 1948, all the glider categories were unified into a single sequence.

- G-2 – Ridgefield (redesignated from PG-2)
- G-3 – Waco (redesignated from PG-3)
- G-4 Hadrian – Waco (redesignated from CG-4)
- G-10 Trojan Horse – Laister-Kauffman (redesignated from CG-10)
- G-13 – Waco (redesignated from CG-13)
- G-14 – Chase (redesignated from CG-14)
- G-15 Hadrian – Waco (redesignated from CG-15)
- G-18 – Chase (redesignated from CG-18)
- G-20 – Chase (redesignated from CG-20)

==== S: Sailplane (1960–1962) ====
- S-1 – Schweizer
- S-2 – Schweizer

=== Liaison ===
==== L: Liaison (1942–1962) ====
- L-1 Vigilant – Stinson (redesignated from O-49 in 1942)
- L-2 Grasshopper – Taylorcraft (redesignated from O-57 in 1942)
- L-3 Grasshopper – Aeronca (redesignated from O-58 in 1942)
- L-4 Grasshopper – Piper (redesignated from O-59 and C-83A in 1942)
  - L-4F/G Grasshopper – Piper (redesignated from C-83 in 1942)
- L-5 Sentinel – Stinson (redesignated from O-62 in 1942)
- L-6 Grasshopper – Interstate (redesignated from O-63 in 1942)
- L-7 – Universal
- L-8 Cadet – Interstate
- L-9 – Stinson (redesignated from AT-19 in 1942)
- L-10 – Ryan
- L-11 – Bellanca
- L-12 Reliant – Stinson
- L-13 – Stinson/Convair
- L-14 Cub – Piper
- L-15 Scout – Boeing
- L-16 Champion – Aeronca
- L-17 Navion – North American/Ryan
- L-18 Super Cub – Piper
- L-19 Bird Dog – Cessna (redesignated to O-1 in 1962)
- L-20 Beaver – de Havilland Canada (redesignated to U-6 in 1962)
- L-21 Super Cub – Piper (redesignated to U-7 in 1962)
- L-22 Navion – Ryan (redesignated to U-18 in 1962)
- L-23 Seminole – Beechcraft (redesignated to U-8 in 1962)
- L-24 Courier – Helio
- L-25 – McDonnell (redesignated to H-35 then V-1)
- L-26 Commander – Aero Design (redesignated to U-4 for Air Force and U-9 for Army variants in 1962)
- L-27 – Cessna (redesignated to U-3 in 1962)
- L-28 Super Courier – Helio (redesignated to U-10 in 1962)

=== Observation ===
==== O: Observation (1924–1942) ====
- O-1 Falcon – Curtiss
- O-2 – Douglas
- O-3 Mohawk – Dayton-Wright
- O-4 – Martin (not built)
- O-5 – Douglas
- O-6 – Thomas-Morse
- O-7 – Douglas
- O-8 – Douglas
- O-9 – Douglas
- O-10 – Loening
- O-11 Falcon – Curtiss
- O-12 Falcon – Curtiss
- O-13 Falcon – Curtiss
- O-14 – Douglas
- O-15 – Keystone
- O-16 Falcon – Curtiss
- O-17 Courier – Consolidated
- O-18 Falcon – Curtiss
- O-19 – Thomas-Morse
- O-20 – Thomas-Morse
- O-21 – Thomas-Morse
- O-22 – Douglas
- O-23 – Thomas-Morse
- O-24 – Curtiss (not built)
- O-25 – Douglas
- O-26 – Curtiss
- O-27 – Fokker
- O-28 Corsair – Vought
- O-29 – Douglas
- O-30 – Curtiss (not built)
- O-31 – Douglas
- O-32 – Douglas
- O-33 – Thomas-Morse
- O-34 – Douglas
- O-35 – Douglas
- O-36 – Douglas
- O-37 – Keystone (not built)
- O-38 – Douglas
- O-39 Falcon – Curtiss
- O-40 Raven – Curtiss
- O-41 – Thomas-Morse
- O-42 – Thomas-Morse
- O-43 – Douglas
- O-44 – Douglas
- O-45 – Martin (not built)
- O-46 – Douglas
- O-47 – North American
- O-48 – Douglas (not built)
- O-49 Vigilant – Stinson (redesignated to L-1 in 1942)
- O-50 – Bellanca
- O-51 Dragonfly – Ryan
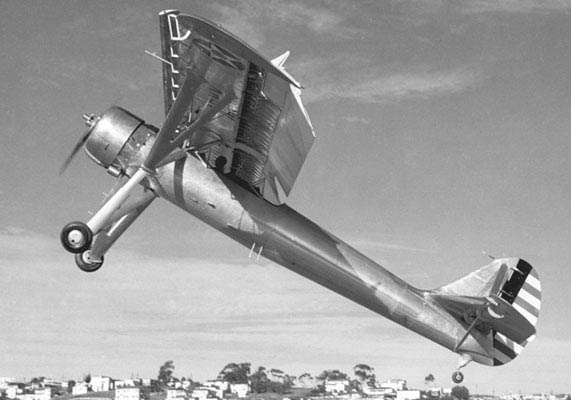
  YO-51 Dragonfly
- O-52 Owl – Curtiss
- O-53 Havoc – Douglas (not built)
- O-54 – Stinson
- O-55 – ERCO
- O-56 Ventura – Lockheed
- O-57 Grasshopper – Taylorcraft (redesignated to L-2 in 1942)
- O-58 Grasshopper – Aeronca (redesignated to L-3 in 1942)
- O-59 Grasshopper – Piper (redesignated to L-4 in 1942)
- O-60 – Kellett
- O-61 – Pitcairn
- O-62 Sentinel – Stinson (redesignated to L-5 in 1942)
- O-63 Grasshopper – Interstate (redesignated to L-6 in 1942)

=== Reconnaissance ===
==== F: Photographic Reconnaissance (1930–1948) ====
- F-1 – Fairchild
- F-2 Expeditor – Beechcraft
- F-3 Havoc – Douglas
- F-4 Lightning – Lockheed
- F-5 Lightning – Lockheed
- F-6 Mustang – North American
- F-7 Liberator – Consolidated
- F-8 Mosquito – de Havilland
- F-9 Flying Fortress – Boeing
- F-10 Mitchell – North American
- F-11 – Hughes
- F-12 Rainbow – Republic
- F-13 Superfortress – Boeing
- F-14 Shooting Star – Lockheed
- F-15 Reporter – Northrop

==== R: Reconnaissance (1948–1962) ====
- R-11 – Hughes (redesignated from F-11)
- R-12 Rainbow – Republic (redesignated from F-12)
- R-16 Stratofortress – Boeing

==== RS: Reconnaissance/Strike (1960–1962) ====
Both of the following aircraft are numbered in the B- (bomber) sequence.

- RS-70 Valkyrie – North American (not built)
- RS-71 Blackbird – Lockheed

=== Rotorcraft ===
==== G: Gyroplane (1935–1939) ====
- G-1 – Kellett
- G-2 – Pitcairn

==== R: Rotary wing (1941–1948) ====
In 1941, the category letter R- was allotted for "rotary wing" aircraft, and this designation was used until the founding of the United States Air Force in 1947, at which point the category letter was changed to H-, for "helicopter". However, the original numbering sequence was retained.

- R-1 – Platt-LePage
- R-2 – Kellett
- R-3 – Kellett
- R-4 Hoverfly – Sikorsky
- R-5 Dragonfly – Sikorsky
- R-6 Hoverfly II – Sikorsky
- R-7 – Sikorsky (not built)
- R-8 – Kellett
- R-9 – Firestone
- R-10 – Kellett
- R-11 – Rotorcraft
- R-12 – Bell
- R-13 Sioux – Bell
- R-14 – Firestone (not built)
- R-15 – Bell
- R-16 – Piasecki

==== H: Helicopter (1948–1962) ====
- H-5 Dragonfly – Sikorsky (redesignated from R-5)
- H-6 Hoverfly II – Sikorsky (redesignated from R-6)
- H-9 – Firestone (redesignated from R-9)
- H-10 – Kellett (redesignated from R-10)
- H-11 – Rotorcraft (redesignated from R-11)
- H-12 – Bell (redesignated from R-12)
- H-13 Sioux – Bell (redesignated from R-13)
- H-15 – Bell (redesignated from R-15)
- H-16 – Piasecki (redesignated from R-16)
- H-17 – Hughes/Kellett
- H-18 – Sikorsky
- H-19 Chickasaw – Sikorsky
- H-20 Little Henry – McDonnell
- H-21 Workhorse/Shawnee – Piasecki
- H-22 – Kaman
- H-23 Raven – Hiller
- H-24 – Seibel
- H-25 Army Mule – Piasecki
- H-26 Jet Jeep – American Helicopter
- H-27 Transporter – Piasecki (redesignated from H-16A)
- H-28 – Hughes (not built)
- H-29 – McDonnell (not built)
- H-30 – McCulloch
- H-31 – Doman
- H-32 Hornet – Hiller
- H-33 – Bell (redesignated to V-3)
- H-34 Choctaw – Sikorsky
- H-35 – McDonnell (redesignated from L-25, later redesignated to V-1)
- H-36 – reserved for secret project LONG EARS
- H-37 Mojave – Sikorsky
- H-38 – reserved for secret project SHORT TAIL
- H-39 – Sikorsky
- H-40 – Bell
- H-41 Seneca – Cessna
- H-42 – Hughes
- H-43 Huskie – Kaman
- H-44 – reserved for secret project BIG TOM
- H-45 – reserved for secret project STEP CHILD

=== Trainer ===
==== AT: Advanced Trainer (1925–1948) ====
- AT-1 – Huff-Daland
- AT-2 – Huff-Daland
- AT-3 – Boeing
- AT-4 Hawk – Curtiss
- AT-5 Hawk – Curtiss
- AT-6 Texan – North American
- AT-7 Navigator – Beechcraft
- AT-8 Bobcat – Cessna
- AT-9 Jeep – Curtiss-Wright
- AT-10 Wichita – Beechcraft
- AT-11 Kansan – Beechcraft
- AT-12 Guardsman – Republic
- AT-13 Gunner – Fairchild
- AT-14 Gunner – Fairchild
- AT-15 Crewmaker – Boeing
- AT-16 – Noorduyn
- AT-17 Bobcat – Cessna
- AT-18 Hudson – Lockheed
- AT-19 Reliant – Stinson
- AT-20 Anson – Federal
- AT-21 Gunner – Fairchild
- AT-22 Liberator – Consolidated
- AT-23 Marauder – Martin
- AT-24 Mitchell – North American

==== BC: Basic Combat (1936–1940) ====
- BC-1 – North American
- BC-2 – North American
- BC-3 – Vultee

==== BT: Basic Trainer (1930–1948) ====
- BT-1 – Douglas
- BT-2 – Douglas
- BT-3 – Stearman
- BT-4 – Curtiss
- BT-5 – Stearman
- BT-6 – Consolidated
- BT-7 – Consolidated
- BT-8 – Seversky
- BT-9 – North American
- BT-10 – North American
- BT-11 – Aircraft Research (not built)
- BT-12 – Fleetwings
- BT-13 Valiant – Vultee
- BT-14 – North American
- BT-15 Valiant – Vultee
- BT-16 Valiant – Vultee
- BT-17 – Boeing-Stearman

==== PT: Primary Trainer (1925–1948) ====
- PT-1 Trusty – Consolidated
- PT-2 Trusty – Consolidated
- PT-3 Trusty – Consolidated
- PT-4 Trusty – Consolidated (not built)
- PT-5 Trusty – Consolidated
- PT-6 – Consolidated
- PT-7 Pinto – Mohawk
- PT-8 – Consolidated
- PT-9 – Stearman
- PT-10 – Verville
- PT-11 – Consolidated
- PT-12 – Consolidated
- PT-13 Kaydet – Boeing-Stearman
- PT-14 – Waco
- PT-15 – St. Louis
- PT-16 – Ryan
- PT-17 Kaydet – Boeing-Stearman
- PT-18 Kaydet – Boeing-Stearman
- PT-19 Cornell – Fairchild
- PT-20 – Ryan
- PT-21 Recruit – Ryan
- PT-22 Recruit – Ryan
- PT-23 Cornell – Fairchild
- PT-24 Tiger Moth – de Havilland
- PT-25 – Ryan
- PT-26 Cornell – Fairchild
- PT-27 Kaydet – Boeing-Stearman

==== T: Trainer (1948–1962) ====
In 1948, the Advanced, Basic, and Primary Trainer categories were unified into one sequence. Below are the designations that were assigned before the introduction of the Tri-Service system. For the designations in the same sequence that were assigned after 1962, see List of United States Tri-Service aircraft designations § Continued original sequence (1962–present).

- T-6 Texan – North American (redesignated from AT-6)
- T-7 Navigator – Beechcraft (redesignated from AT-7)
- T-11 Kansan – Beechcraft (redesignated from AT-11)
- T-13 Valiant – Vultee (redesignated from BT-13)
- T-13 Kaydet – Boeing-Stearman (conflicting designation, redesignated from PT-13)
- T-17 Kaydet – Boeing-Stearman (redesignated from PT-17)
- T-19 Cornell – Fairchild (redesignated from PT-19)
- T-28 Trojan – North American
- T-29 Samaritan – Convair
- T-30 – Douglas (not built)
- T-31 – Fairchild (not built)
- T-32 Samaritan – Convair (not built)
- T-33 Shooting Star – Lockheed
- T-34 Mentor – Beechcraft
- T-35 Buckaroo – Temco
- T-36 – Beechcraft
- T-37 Tweet – Cessna
- T-38 Talon – Northrop
- T-39 Sabreliner – North American
- T-40 JetStar – Lockheed (not built)

=== VTOL ===
==== V: VTOL (1954–1962) ====
- V-1 – McDonnell (redesignated from H-35)
- V-2 – Sikorsky (not built)
- V-3 – Bell (redesignated from H-33)

== See also ==
- List of U.S. DoD aircraft designations
- United States military aircraft serial numbers
- List of active United States military aircraft
- List of undesignated military aircraft of the United States
- List of United States Navy aircraft designations (pre-1962)
- List of United States Tri-Service aircraft designations
- United States military aircraft engine designations
- List of fighter aircraft
- List of maritime patrol aircraft
- List of airborne early warning aircraft
- List of tanker aircraft

== Bibliography ==
- Andrade, John M. (1979). U.S. Military Aircraft Designations and Serials Since 1909. Midland Counties Publications. ISBN 978-0-904597-22-6.
