= O24 =

O24 or O-24 may refer to:

- Curtiss O-24, a proposed American observation aircraft
- Dodge O24, an American hatchback
- HNLMS O 24, a submarine of the Royal Netherlands Navy
- Lee Vining Airport, in Mono County, California, United States
- Oxygen-24, an isotope of oxygen
