= Consolidated O-17 Courier =

Former American aircraft

O-17 Courier
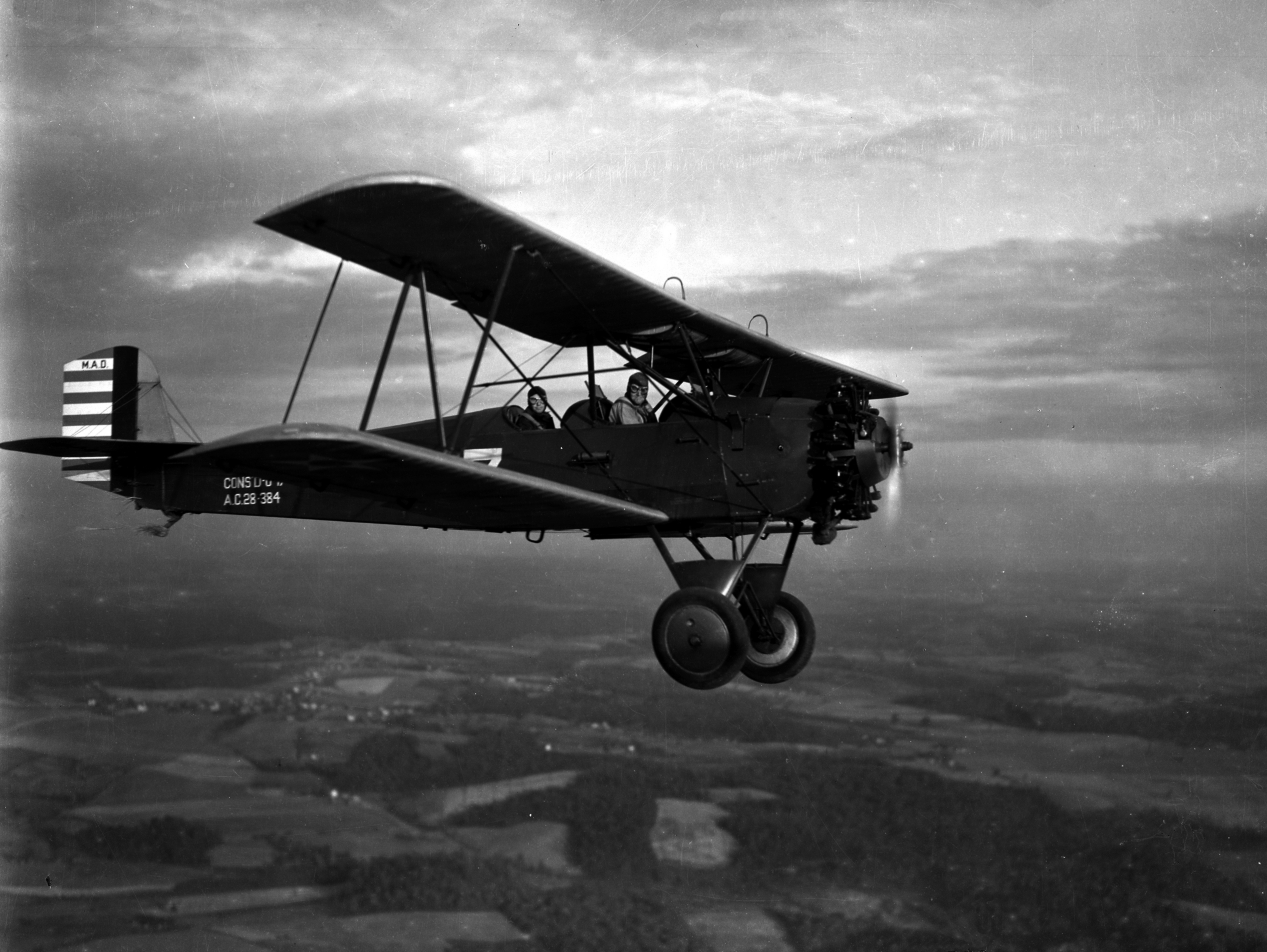
- A Maryland Air National Guard Consolidated O-17

General information
- Type: Observation
- Manufacturer: Consolidated Aircraft Company
- Primary users: United States National Guard Royal Canadian Air Force
- Number built: 35

History
- Manufactured: 1928
- First flight: April 1927
- Developed from: Consolidated PT-3

The Consolidated O-17 Courier (company designation Model 2) was an observation and training aircraft used by the United States National Guard.

== Development ==
A parallel development to the Consolidated PT-3 series, the XO-17 was a converted PT-3 with such refinements as improved fuselage streamlining, oleo shock absorbers, wheel brakes, balanced elevators and increased fuel capacity.

It was used almost exclusively as a cross-country flying, gunnery, photographic and radio trainer. The O-17 had a removable fairing (carrying a Scarff ring mounting for one .30 cal (7.62 mm) trainable Browning machine gun).

The Royal Canadian Air Force purchased three generally similar aircraft, two Model 7 landplanes and one Model 8 floatplane, the latter with the same float gear as the NY series.

The sole XO-17A was converted from the PT-3 as a demonstrator that failed to secure any orders. It was later fitted with the experimental Packard DR-980 Diesel engine of 225 hp (168 kW).

The Model 15 was also an O-17 type airframe fitted with a Pratt & Whitney R-1340 engine. It too failed to win any contracts.

== Variants ==
XO-17 (prototype)
Consolidated PT-3 Conversion with a 225 hp (168 kW) Wright R-790-1 engine, streamlined fuselage, modified undercarriage, increased fuel capacity, provision for dual controls and a dorsal 0.3 in (7.62 mm) gun, one conversion.
O-17 Model 2 Courier
Production version for United States National Guard use, 29 built.
XO-17A (prototype)
One Consolidated PT-3 converted with a Wright R-790-3 engine intended for export.
Model 7 (RCAF landplane)
Royal Canadian Air Force, two built.
Model 8 (RCAF floatplane)
Royal Canadian Air Force, one built.
XPT-8 (demonstrator)
The airframe of the XO-17A prototype fitted with a Packard DR-980 Diesel engine of 225 hp (168 kw), scrapped in 1932.
XPT-8A
A single PT-3A (29-115) similarly converted with a Packard DR-980 Diesel engine with Project Number 'P-564', but returned to PT-3A configuration. The airframe was subsequently lost in a fatal midair with a P-12C of the 17th Pursuit Squadron 2 miles W of New Baltimore, Michigan on 17 December 1931.
Model 15 (demonstrator)
Conversion with a Pratt & Whitney R-1340 engine.

== Operators ==
Canada

- Royal Canadian Air Force

United States

- United States National Guard

Turkey

- Eskisehir Air School

== Specifications ==
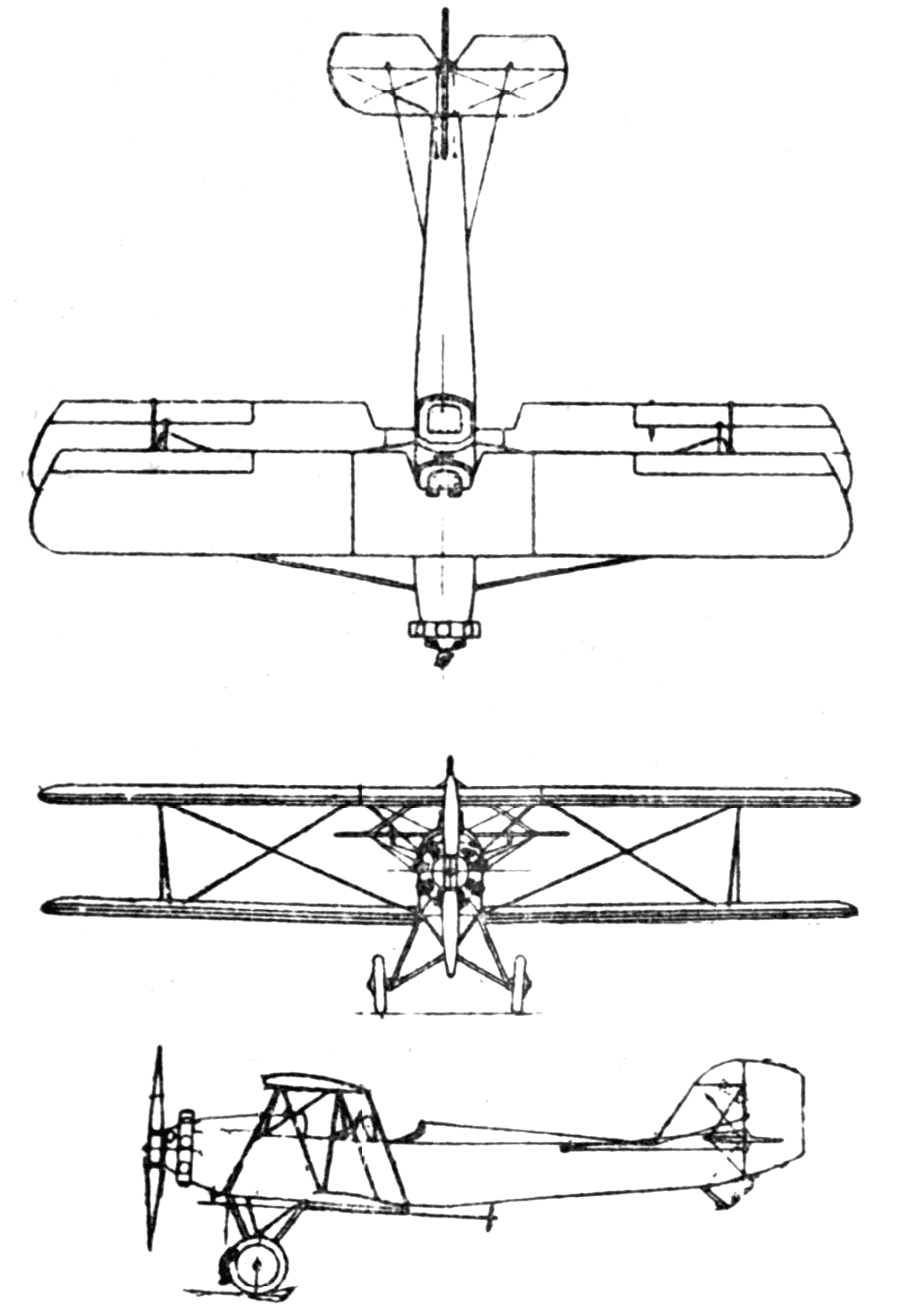
Consolidated Courier 3-view drawing from L'Air April 15, 1928

Data from Eden & Moeng (2002)

General characteristics

- Crew: two
- Length: 27 ft 11 in (8.51 m)
- Wingspan: 34 ft 5.5 in (10.5 m)
- Height: 9 ft 9 in (2.97 m)
- Wing area: 296 sq ft (27.5 m^{2})
- Empty weight: 1,881 lb (853 kg)
- Max takeoff weight: 2,723 lb (1,235 kg)
- Powerplant: 1 × Wright R-790-1 radial piston engine, 225 hp (168 kW)

Performance

- Maximum speed: 118 mph (190 km/h, 103 kn)
- Cruise speed: 100 mph (161 km/h, 87 kn)
- Range: 550 mi (885 km, 480 nmi)
- Service ceiling: 12,000 ft (3,700 m)
- Rate of climb: 865 ft/min (4.4 m/s)

Armament

- 1 × .30 cal (7.62 mm) M1919 Browning machine gun

== See also ==
- Consolidated PT-1 Trusty
- Consolidated PT-3
- Consolidated PT-11
