= Radioplane OQ-12 =

American WWII target drone

OQ-12

General information
- Type: Target drone
- National origin: United States
- Manufacturer: Radioplane
- Primary user: USAAF
- Number built: 1

History
- First flight: October 1941

The Radioplane OQ-12 (company designation RP-6 was a target drone in the United States, manufactured by the Radioplane company.

== Design and development ==
The OQ-12 design had a round, cigar-shaped fuselage, a single 1 1/2 hp piston engine which drove counter rotating propellers, and a weight of 45 pounds. The wing had a cantilever structure and was of plywood construction.

The OQ-12 was most likely intended as a competitor to the Simmonds Aerocessories OQ-11, and it first flew in October 1941, but remained a prototype only.

== See also ==
Related lists

- List of military aircraft of the United States
