= Fleetwings A-1 =

WWII American target drone

A-1

General information
- Type: Target drone
- National origin: United States
- Manufacturer: Kaiser-Fleetwings
- Primary user: USAAC
- Number built: 1

History
- First flight: 1939

The Fleetwings A-1 was an American target drone manufactured by Kaiser-Fleetwings.

== Design and development ==
The A-1 was built in 1939 as a small aerial gunnery target. It was flown unmanned and controlled by radio commands from the ground. It was a mid-wing monoplane with fixed tricycle landing gear. The A-1 utilized a Radio Frequency Laboratories control unit, broadcasting on 73 MHz; control was by traditional aircraft-style controls operated by the controller; alternatively the controller could wear a control yoke on a chest-mounted support.

== Operational history ==
Manufacturer's flight trials of the A-1 were conducted at Boonton Township Airfield; following them delivery was made to the Aberdeen Proving Ground for Army trials. The first Army test flight ended in the aircraft crashing, and the project was abandoned.

== Specifications ==
General characteristics

- Crew: none
- Wingspan: 20 ft 0 in (6.0 m)
- Powerplant: 1 × unknown , 80 hp (60 kW)

Performance

- Maximum speed: 180 mph (290 km/h, 160 kn)
- Endurance: 1 hours 0 minutes
- Service ceiling: 10,000 ft (3,000 m)
