= Frankfort CG-1 =

CG-1

General information
- Type: Transport glider
- National origin: United States
- Manufacturer: Frankfort Sailplane Company
- Status: Project cancelled
- Number built: None

The Frankfort CG-1 was a proposed Second World War American transport glider to be built for the United States Army, none were built and the programme was cancelled.

== Design and development ==
When the Army Air Corps started a glider development program in 1941 it ordered two types of transport glider from the Frankfort Sailplane Company, a nine-seat and a 15-seat glider. The smaller glider was to carry a pilot and eight troops and the prototype was designated the XCG-1, the larger glider designated the XCG-2 was to have a pilot and co-pilot and carried 13 troops.

The company was busy with the production of the TG-1 training glider so the development of the two new types was slow but a static test XCG-1 was delivered to Wright Field in December 1941 for testing by the Army. The glider failed structural tests and the Army cancelled the contract for both the CG-1 and CG-2.

== Variants ==
XCG-1
Prototype nine-seat transport glider, one non-flyable static test example only.
XCG-2
Prototype 15-seat transport glider, not built.

== See also ==
- Military gliders
