= Read-York CG-12 =

American WWII proposed glider

CG-12

General information
- Type: Transport glider
- National origin: United States
- Manufacturer: Read-York
- Status: prototype only
- Number built: 1

The Read-York CG-12 was a Second World War American transport glider designed for the United States Army.

== Design and development ==
The CG-12 was a large transport glider with a seating capacity for 30 troops. Two were ordered (serials 42-68304/68305) on 24 September 1942 along with a static test airframe but the program was cancelled on 5 November 1943 following wind tunnel tests with models. The static test article, delivered on 27 July 1943, failed structural tests.

== Specifications (CG-9) ==
General characteristics

- Crew: 2
- Capacity: 28 troops / 8,282 lb (3,757 kg) payload
- Length: 70 ft 0 in (21.34 m)
- Wingspan: 112 ft 0 in (34.14 m)
- Empty weight: 9,349 lb (4,241 kg)
- Gross weight: 17,631 lb (7,997 kg)

Performance

- Never exceed speed: 150 mph (240 km/h, 130 kn)

== See also ==
- Military gliders
