= Laister-Kauffman CG-10 =

CG-10
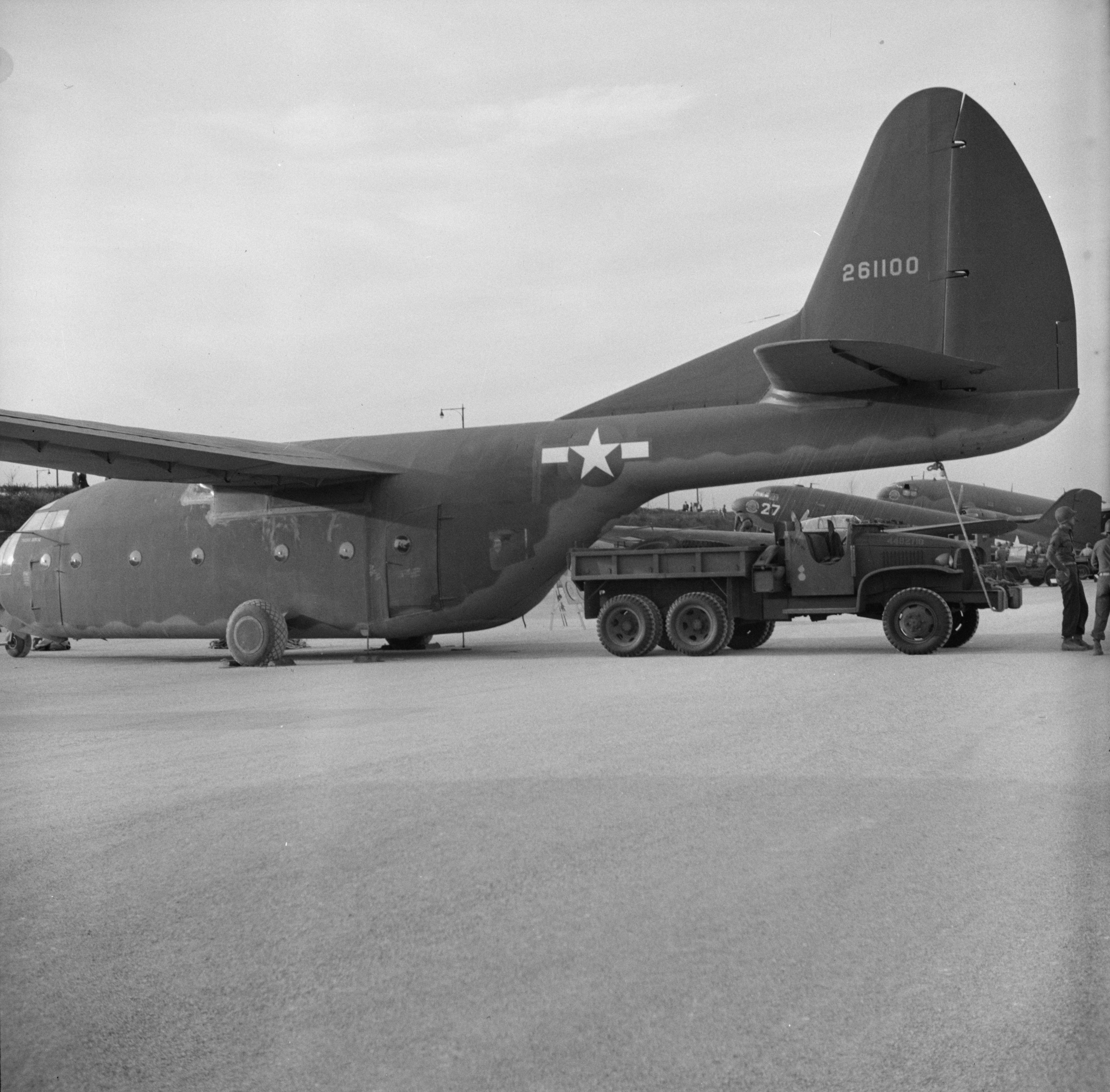
- CG-10A

General information
- Type: Transport Glider
- Designer: Laister-Kauffman
- Primary user: USAAF
- Number built: 5

History
- First flight: 1943

The Laister-Kauffman CG-10 was an American military transport glider aircraft developed during World War II.

== Design and development ==
The development version was known as XCG-10. This version could carry 30 troops. It was accepted on October 4, 1943. The first test tow flight took place on November 6, 1943. The second version, XCG-10A, increased seating capacity to 42 and added a rear loading door. Cargo capacity was up to 6 short tons (5.4 t).

The production version, CG-10A, had an initial order of 990 with the intention of being used for the planned invasion of Japan. 90 were on the production line of St. Louis, Missouri , when the program was cancelled. Laister-Kauffman considered fitting the planes with two Pratt & Whitney R-1830-92 engines but this plan never came to fruition.

== Specifications (XCG-10A) ==
Data from Fighting Gliders of World War II, United States Military Aircraft: CG = Transport Glider (1941-1955), Popular Science February 1945 : What's New in Aviation

General characteristics

- Crew: 2
- Capacity: 42 troops / 2½-ton truck / two 105mm M2 howitzers / one M1 155 mm Long Tom howitzer / one M2 howitzer with a 1-ton 4 x 4 truck / 10,850 lb (4,921 kg) payload
- Length: 67 ft (20 m)
- Wingspan: 105 ft (32 m)
- Height: 26 ft 3.6 in (8.016 m)
- Cargo compartment:

- Length: 30 ft (9 m)
- Width: 8 ft 6 in (3 m)
- Height: 6 ft 8.4 in (2 m)

- Wing area: 1,180 sq ft (110 m^{2})
- Aspect ratio: 8.15
- Airfoil: root: NACA 23018; tip: NACA 4412
- Empty weight: 12,150 lb (5,511 kg)
- Gross weight: 23,000 lb (10,433 kg)

Performance

- Stall speed: 75 mph (121 km/h, 65 kn) flaps up

62–70 mph (54–61 kn; 100–113 km/h) flaps down

- Never exceed speed: 180 mph (290 km/h, 160 kn)

140 mph (122 kn; 225 km/h) flaps down

== See also ==
Related lists

- List of aircraft of World War II
- List of World War II military gliders

== Operators ==
United States

- United States Army Air Forces
