= Brunswick-Balke-Collender OQ-4 =

American WWII target drone

OQ-4

General information
- Type: Target drone
- National origin: United States
- Manufacturer: Brunswick-Balke-Collender
- Primary user: USAAF
- Number built: unknown

History
- First flight: unknown

The Brunswick-Balke-Collender OQ-4 was a prototype drone built in the United States by the Brunswick-Balke-Collender corporation.

The OQ-4 was one of a very few aviation-related ventures undertaken by Brunswick-Balke-Collender, which was basically a non-aviation company. It was similar in some respects to the Radioplane OQ-2, including a 12-foot wingspan. Although a few prototypes were built, the OQ-4 was not put into production, perhaps because Radioplane and Frankfort could produce enough target drone so that another production line was not necessary.

== Specifications ==
General characteristics

- Crew: none
- Wingspan: 12 ft 0 in (3.6 m)
- Powerplant: 1 × engine , 7 hp (5 kW)

Performance

- Endurance: 1 hours 0 minutes

== See also ==
Related lists

- List of military aircraft of the United States
