= Douglas XNO-2 =

American observation aircraft proposal

Douglas NO-2

General information
- Type: Night observation aircraft
- Manufacturer: Douglas
- Status: design study only
- Primary user: US Army Air Corps
- Number built: 0

The Douglas NO-2 was a 1920s proposal for a reconnaissance aircraft by Douglas.

== Design ==
The NO-2 was intended to utilize a tractor engine, high wing configuration, with power coming from two Wright J-5 Whirlwind radial engines each delivering 220 hp (160 kW).
