= AGA Aviation CG-9 =

American WWII proposed glider

CG-9

General information
- Type: Transport glider
- National origin: United States
- Manufacturer: AGA Aviation Corporation
- Status: Project cancelled
- Number built: None

The AGA Aviation CG-9, company designation AGA Aviation G.5 was a proposed Second World War American transport glider to be built for the United States Army Air Force (USAAF), none were built and the programme was cancelled.

== Design and development ==
The CG-9 was a large transport glider of twin-boom configuration with a seating capacity for 32 troops. The central fuselage nacelle sat 20 troops, while the outboard nacelles each carried six troops. Ordered on 27 June 1942, the two prototypes, given serials 42-56697/56698, were not completed, although a mock-up had been completed and had been inspected. At the time of cancellation, on 2 December 1942, the static test airframe was 55% completed, the first aircraft 5% complete and the second aircraft only 1% complete.

== Specifications (CG-9) ==
Data from CG-9 : AGA Aviation G.5

General characteristics

- Crew: 2
- Capacity: 32
- Length: 63 ft 11 in (19.48 m)
- Wingspan: 108 ft 6 in (33.07 m)

Performance

- Never exceed speed: 150 mph (240 km/h, 130 kn)

== See also ==
- Military gliders
