= OQ-18 =

General information
- Type: Target drone
- National origin: United States
- Primary user: USAAF
- Number built: 1

History
- First flight: 1945

The OQ-18 was a prototype American subscale RPV built for the US Army Air Forces in the mid-1940s.

== Development ==
The OQ-18 was a short-endurance drone and larger than other OQ-series drones. In 1945, the OQ-18 was built and tested by the USAAF, but never entered production.

== Specification ==
Data from

General characteristics

- Crew: none
- Wingspan: 15 ft 0 in (4.6 m)
- Gross weight: 550 lb (250 kg)
- Powerplant: 1 × unknown , 150 hp (110 kW)

Performance

- Maximum speed: 250 mph (400 km/h, 220 kn)
- Range: 10 mi (16 km, 8.7 nmi)
- Endurance: 1 hours 0 minutes
- Service ceiling: 20,000 ft (6,100 m)

== See also ==
- History of unmanned aerial vehicles § Reginald Denny and the Radioplane

Related lists

- List of military aircraft of the United States
