= Frankfort Cinema =

Cinema, TG-1
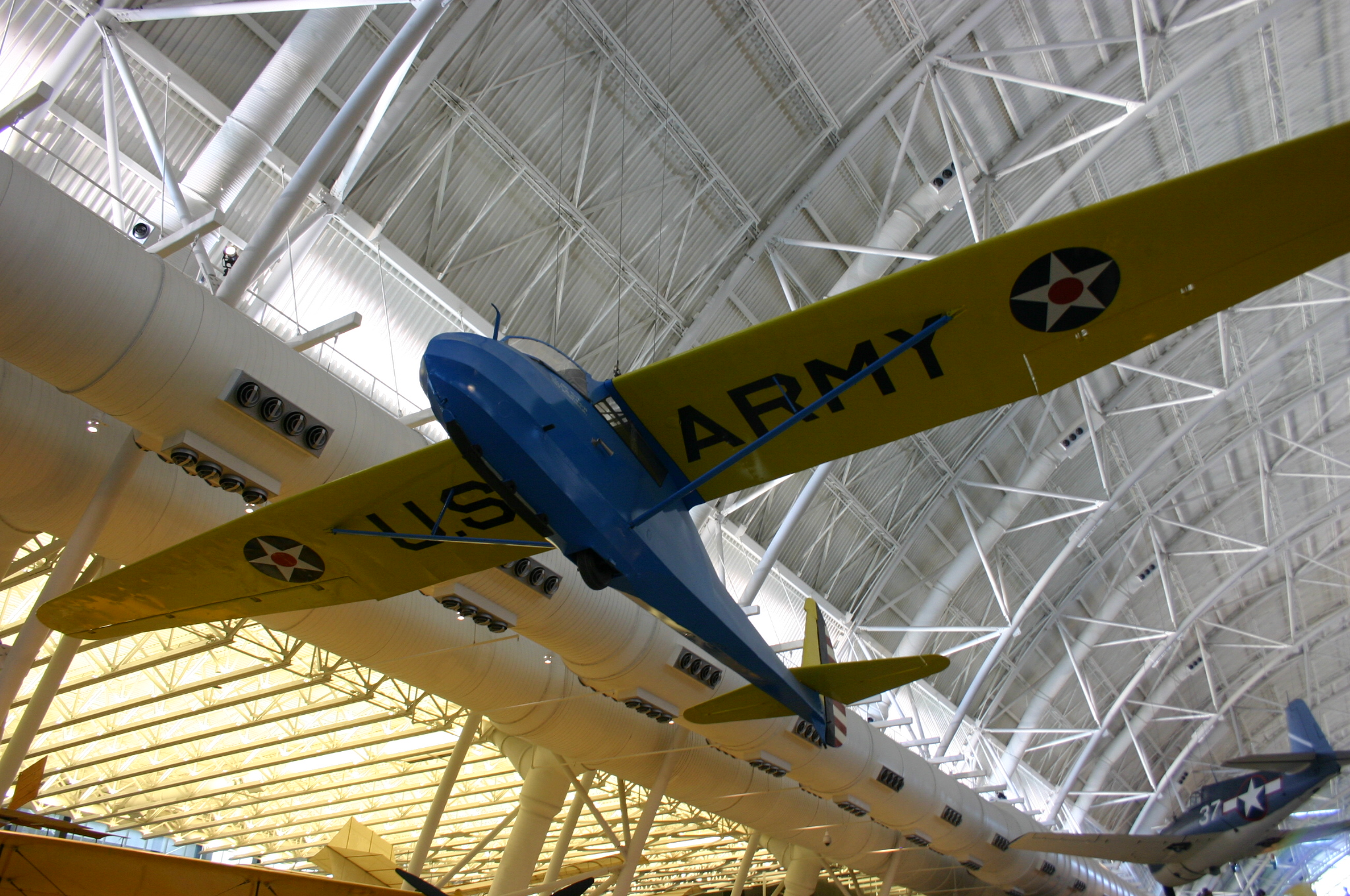
- A Frankfort Cinema TG-1A on display at the Steven F. Udvar-Hazy Center in Chantilly, Virginia.

General information
- Type: Sailplane
- Manufacturer: Frankfort
- Designer: Stanley Corcoran

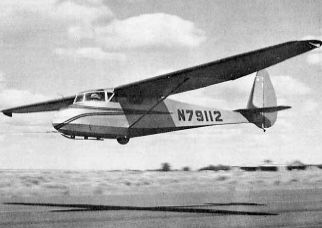
Twentynine Palms AirAcademy TG-1A glider a training glider a Frankfort Cinema with the Army designation TG-1

The Frankfort Cinema is a sailplane manufactured in the United States in the 1930s and 1940s and which was used by the United States Army Air Corps as a training glider under the designation TG-1. It was a high-wing, strut-braced design with a fully enclosed cabin. Originally designed as a single-seater, a two-seat version designated the Cinema II was produced soon afterwards, and this design was put forward when the Army issued a requirement for training gliders. At the same time, the company was awarded production contracts for transport gliders, the CG-1 and CG-2.

However, Frankfort lacked the resources to quickly produce large numbers of gliders, and only 43 TG-1s were delivered. The TG-1 designation was also applied to 10 civilian Cinemas that were impressed into Army service.

== Variants ==
Cinema
baseline design
Cinema II
two-seat version
TG-1
USAAF designation for Cinema II
TG-23
USAAF designation for one impressed Cinema I (serial n/o 42-57192)

== Aircraft on display ==
- US Southwest Soaring Museum
- Western Antique Aeroplane and Automobile Museum

== Specifications (Cinema II) ==
General characteristics

- Crew: One pilot
- Capacity: 1 passenger
- Length: 23 ft 4 in (7.10 m)
- Wingspan: 46 ft 3 in (14.10 m)
- Aspect ratio: 10.7
- Empty weight: 500 lb (227 kg)
- Gross weight: 920 lb (417 kg)

Performance

- Maximum speed: 80 mph (130 km/h, 70 kn)
- Maximum glide ratio: 20
- Rate of sink: 190 ft/min (1.0 m/s)
