= Wichita Engineering TG-10 =

WWII American training glider

TG-10

General information
- Type: Glider
- National origin: United States
- Manufacturer: Wichita Engineering
- Number built: 0

The Wichita Engineering TG-10 was a proposed American training glider conceived by Wichita Engineering in the early 1940s.

== Design and development ==
The TG-10 was designed as a two-seat training glider with a side-by-side cockpit configuration. One aircraft was ordered on 25 June 1942 with the serial 42-57197. However, the contract was cancelled on 1 March 1943 before the aircraft was completed.

== Specifications ==
Data from

General characteristics

- Crew: one
- Length: 25 ft 1 in (7.65 m)
- Wingspan: 50 ft 1 in (15.27 m)

Performance

- Maximum speed: 90 mph (145 km/h, 78 kn)

== See also ==
- List of gliders
