= Huff-Daland XHB-3 =

Proposed American heavy bomber

General information
- Type: Heavy bomber
- National origin: United States
- Manufacturer: Huff-Daland
- Status: project only
- Number built: 0

The Huff-Daland XHB-3 was a proposed heavy bomber envisaged by Huff-Daland in the late 1920s. The leadership of the United States Army Air Corps found the XHB-3 design too radical to be a real proposition, so the design remained a paper project only.

== Specifications ==
Data from

General characteristics

- Crew: 5
- Powerplant: 2 × Packard 2A-2540 12-cylinder V-cylinder piston engines, 787 hp (587 kW) each
- Propellers: metal propellers

Performance

- Landing speed:
