= Douglas CG-19 =

XCG-19

General information
- Type: Military transport aircraft
- Manufacturer: Douglas Aircraft Company
- Status: project only
- Number built: 0

The Douglas CG-19 was a late 1940s assault glider project conceived by the Douglas Aircraft Company.

== Development ==
On January 31, 1946, the United States Army Air Service promulgated a requirement for two new assault gliders, a light glider capable of hauling 8,000 lb (3,628.7 kg) of military equipment within a 24 ft (7.3 m) long cargo space, and a heavy glider capable of hauling 16,000 lb (7,257.5 kg) of military equipment within 30 ft (9.1 m) long cargo space. Chase and Douglas were awarded contracts to build 'light glider' prototypes, with the Chase design being designated XCG-18 and the Douglas Model 1028 receiving the XCG-19 designation. (Note: The CG-19 was known by Air Material Command as the MX-878.) The Model 1028/CG-19 utilized aluminum for the construction of the fuselage, and its cargo compartment was 24.7 ft × 7.7 ft × 6.5 ft (7.5 m × 2.3 m × 2.0 m); for loading cargo, the CG-19's rear fuselage was hinged to swing sideways. A mockup of the CG-19 was inspected in March 1947, but when the US Air Force was facing tight budget constraints with respect to the CG-18 and CG-19 designs, it decided to cancel the CG-19 because the CG-18 was nearing completion.

== Specifications ==
Data from American Secret Projects 2: Airlifters 1941-1961.

General characteristics

- Crew: Two pilots
- Capacity: 30 troops
- Length: 61 ft 8 in (18.80 m)
- Wingspan: 85 ft 0 in (25.91 m)
- Height: 24 ft (7.3 m)
- Gross weight: 14,200 lb (6,441 kg)

Performance

- Stall speed: 55 mph (89 km/h, 48 kn)
- Maximum towing speed: 200 mph (174 kn; 322 km/h)
