= Snead CG-11 =

American WWII proposed glider

CG-11

General information
- Type: Transport glider
- National origin: United States
- Manufacturer: Snead
- Status: Project cancelled
- Number built: None

The Snead CG-11 was a proposed Second World War American transport glider to be built for the United States Army, none were built and the programme was cancelled.

== Design and development ==
The CG-11 was a large transport glider with a seating capacity for 30 troops. Two prototypes were ordered on 22 April 1942 (serial numbers 42-68302/68303) together with a static test airframe but development was cancelled on 9 June 1943 following wind tunnel tests with models.

== Specifications (CG-11) ==
Data from

General characteristics

- Capacity: 28 troops
- Length: 35 ft 0 in (10.67 m)
- Wingspan: 112 ft 0 in (34.14 m)

Performance

- Never exceed speed: 150 mph (240 km/h, 130 kn)

== See also ==
- Military gliders
