= Consolidated PT-3 =

Former American training aircraft

PT-3
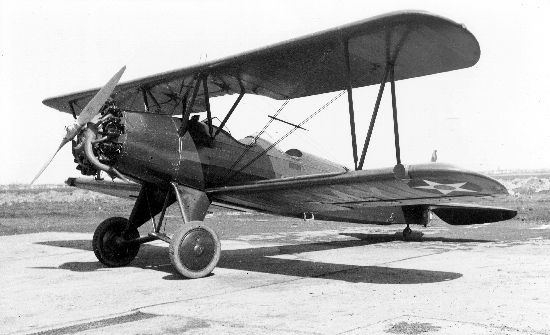
- Consolidated PT-3

General information
- Type: Trainer
- Manufacturer: Consolidated Aircraft Company
- Primary user: United States Army Air Corps
- Number built: 250

History
- Manufactured: September 1927
- Introduction date: 1927
- Variants: Consolidated NY, Consolidated O-17

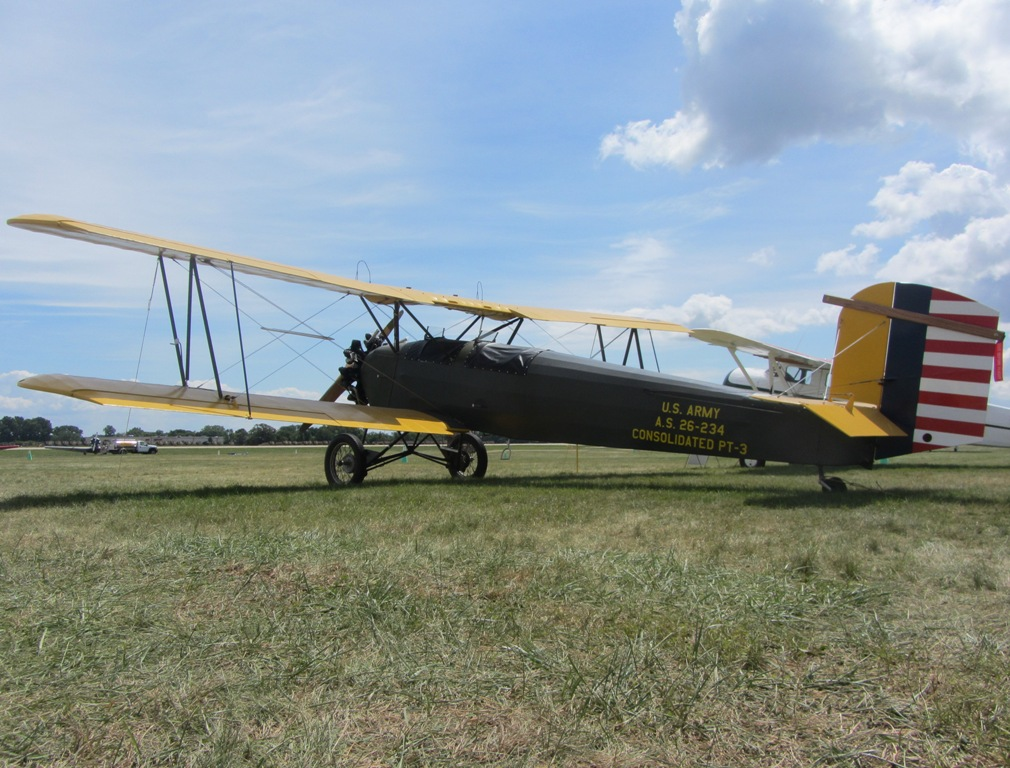
PT-3 replica

The Consolidated Model 2 was a training airplane used by the United States Army Air Corps, under the designation PT-3 and the United States Navy under the designation NY-1.

== Development ==
Seeing the success of the Navy's NY-1 modification of a PT-1 airframe, the USAAC came to the conclusion that a radial engine was indeed ideal for a trainer. It was reliable and offered a good power-to-weight ratio. Therefore, one PT-1 airframe was completed as XPT-2 with a 220 hp (164 kW) Wright J-5 Whirlwind radial engine.

The XPT-3 was almost identical to the XPT-2 except for the tail, revised wing panels and different shape. 130 production PT-3 aircraft were ordered in September 1927, with one being completed as the XO-17. These were followed by 120 PT-3A aircraft with minor changes. The XPT-3 became the XPT-5 when fitted with the Curtiss Challenger R-600 two-row six-cylinder radial engine, but was soon converted to PT-3 standard.

The PT-3 aircraft were superseded by the Boeing PT-13 Stearman starting in 1937, but a number were still operational with the Spartan Flying School in Tulsa Oklahoma into the middle of World War II.

== Variants ==
XPT-2
one PT-1 airframe with a 220 hp (160 kW) Wright J-5 (R-790) radial engine, wingspan 34 ft 7 in (10.5 m), length 28 ft 4 in (8.6 m), gross weight 2,427 lb (1100 kg)
XPT-3
one PT-1 airframe with revised wing panels (Clark "Y" wings) and a different vertical tail, wingspan 34 ft 6 in (10.5 m), length 28 ft 3 in (8.6 m), gross weight 2,439 lb (1106 kg)
PT-3
130 ordered, one completed as the XO-17 prototype, gross weight 2,481 lb (1125 kg)
PT-3A
120 ordered with minor updates, Wright J-5, gross weight 2,432 lb (1103 kg)
XPT-4
unbuilt, was to be a development PT-3 with the experimental Fairchild-Caminez 447C engine
XPT-5
the airframe of the XPT-3 was temporarily fitted with the Curtiss Challenger R-600-1 two-row six-cylinder radial engine in 1929, later converted to PT-3 standard

== Operators ==
Cuba

- Cuban Air Force, ten PT-3s.

Argentina

- Argentine Air Force, one PT-3.

Brazil

- Brazilian Naval Aviation, one PT-3, serial number 434.

Peru

- Peruvian Air Force, one PT-3.

Mexico

- a small number may have been sold to Mexico

United States

- United States Army Air Corps
- United States Navy
- United States Marine Corps

== Surviving aircraft ==
- The last Consolidated PT-3 was amongst the aircraft lost in the San Diego Air & Space Museum 1978 fire.
- An airworthy PT-3 replica belongs to the EAA Aviation Museum in Oshkosh, Wisconsin. It incorporates parts of a PT-1 that once flew with the 154th Observation Squadron of the Arkansas National Guard, was later owned by the University of Arkansas College of Engineering and was rebuilt as a PT-3 reproduction with a radial J-5 Engine.

== Specifications (PT-3) ==
Data from "United States Military Aircraft Since 1908" by Gordon Swanborough & Peter M. Bowers (Putnam Newy York, ISBN 0-370-00094-3) 1977, 675 pp.

General characteristics

- Crew: two
- Length: 28 ft 1 in (8.56 m)
- Wingspan: 34 ft 6 in (10.52 m)
- Height: 10 ft 3 in (3.12 m)
- Wing area: 300 sq ft (27.87 m^{2})
- Empty weight: 1,785 lb (810 kg)
- Max takeoff weight: 2,481 lb (1,125 kg)
- Powerplant: 1 × Wright R-790-AB radial, 220 hp (164 kW)

Performance

- Maximum speed: 102 mph (164 km/h, 89 kn)
- Cruise speed: 81 mph (130 km/h, 70 kn)
- Range: 300 mi (483 km, 260 nmi)
- Service ceiling: 14,000 ft (4,300 m)
- Rate of climb: 658 ft/min (3.34 m/s)

== See also ==
- Consolidated PT-1 "Trusty"
- Consolidated O-17
- Consolidated PT-11
