= OQ-5 =

American WWII target drone

General information
- Type: Target drone
- National origin: United States
- Manufacturer: Radioplane
- Status: experimental
- Primary user: USAAF
- Number built: 1

History
- First flight: 1943

The Radioplane OQ-5 (company designation RP-7) was an experimental target drone built in the United States in World War II.

== Design and development ==
The OQ-5 was similar to the Radioplane OQ-2 in having a wingspan measuring 12 feet (3.7 meters) and counter-rotating propellers but differed in being of plywood construction and having a plywood cantilever wing. Only one example of the OQ-5 was built, but no production order was ever placed.

== See also ==
Related lists

- List of military aircraft of the United States
