= Consolidated PT-11 =

PT-11
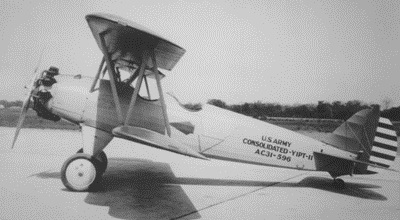
- Consolidated Y1PT-11

General information
- Type: Primary trainer
- Manufacturer: Consolidated Aircraft Company, Fleet Aircraft
- Primary users: United States Army Air Corps United States Coast Guard
- Number built: 41

History
- Introduction date: 1931

The Consolidated Model 21 was an American two-seat training aircraft built by the Consolidated Aircraft Company. It was used by the United States Army Air Corps with the designation PT-11 and the United States Coast Guard under the designation N4Y.

== Design and development ==
The Model 21 was an aerodynamic cleaned up version of the Model 12/PT-3, one of the distinguishing features being curved instead of angular tail surfaces. The aircraft was a single-engined biplane with fixed tailwheel landing gear and accommodation for two in open cockpits.

== Operational history ==
Designated the PT-11 by the United States Army Air Corps it progressed through a number of trial variants but was not built in large numbers. 11 Examples of the model 21-C were built in Canada as the 21-M for Mexico but none were built for local use.

== Variants ==
XPT-933
(Model 21A). Prototype powered by 170 hp (130 kW) Kinner engine, first flew February 1931.
YPT-11
Evaluation aircraft for US Army based on the Model 21A with a 165 hp (123 kW) Continental R-545-1 engine, four built.
PT-11A
One YPT-11 was re-engined with a 175 hp (130 kW) Curtiss R-600-1 Challenger engine, originally as Y1PT-11A, later converted to PT-11C standard.
Y1PT-11B
One YPT-11 was re-engined with a 210 hp (160 kW) Kinner YR-720-1 engine and designated Y1PT-11B. 5 production aircraft for US Army with another for the United States Coast Guard and designated N4Y-1.
PT-11C
PT-11A re-engined with a 180 hp (130 kW) Lycoming YR-680-1 engine. One or two converted for US Army, with 18 new-build aircraft for Colombia.
PT-11D
Production version with 220 hp (160 kW) R-680-3 engine, originally designated Y1PT-11D. 21 new-built, plus five conversions from Y1PT11-Bs and two from Y1PT-11s.
PT-12
A version of the PT-11 with a 300hp R-985-1 engine and detailed changes, ten built later redesignated BT-7.

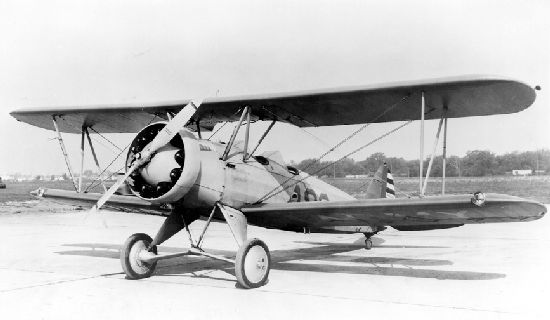
Y1BT-6

Y1BT-6
One YPT-11 was re-engined with a 300hp R-985-1
BT-6
Redesignation of Y1BT-6.

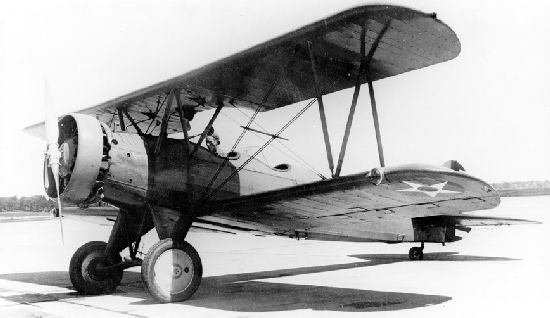
BT-7

BT-7
PT-12 aircraft redesignated.
XN4Y-1
Evaluation aircraft for the United States Coast Guard, three built.
N4Y-1
One YPT-11B for the USCG, later modified to the same standard as the XN4Y-1

== Operators ==
United States

- United States Army Air Corps
- United States Coast Guard

Colombia

- Colombian Air Force (PT-11C).

Paraguay

- Paraguayan Air Arm (Model 21-C).

Mexico

- Mexican Air Force (Model 21-M).

== Specifications (PT-11D) ==
Data from "The Illustrated Encyclopedia of Aircraft (Part Work 1982-1985)" Orbis Publishing

General characteristics

- Crew: two
- Length: 26 ft 11 in (8.20 m)
- Wingspan: 31 ft 7 in (9.63 m)
- Height: 9 ft 8 in (2.95 m)
- Wing area: 280 sq ft (26.01 m^{2})
- Empty weight: 1,918 lb (870 kg)
- Max takeoff weight: 2,585 lb (1,173 kg)
- Powerplant: 1 × Lycoming R-680A radial piston, 200 hp (149 kW)

Performance

- Maximum speed: 118 mph (190 km/h, 103 kn)
- Service ceiling: 13,700 ft (4,175 m)

== See also ==
- Consolidated PT-3
