= Consolidated PT-1 Trusty =

US military trainer aircraft

PT-1
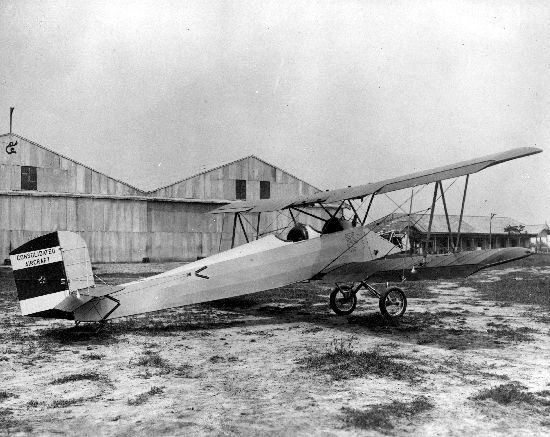
- Consolidated PT-1

General information
- Type: Primary Trainer
- Manufacturer: Consolidated
- Designer: Colonel Virginius E. Clark
- Primary users: United States Army Air Service United States Navy; Siam; U.S. Army National Guard
- Number built: 221

History
- Manufactured: 1923
- Introduction date: 1921
- Developed into: Consolidated PT-3

The Consolidated PT-1 Trusty (company designation Model 1) is a biplane primary trainer used by the United States Army Air Service (USAAS) in the 1920s.

== Design and development ==
In 1921, Colonel Virginius Clark, chief designer of the Dayton-Wright Company, designed the Chummy sporting biplane. The airframe was advanced in its use of the new Clark Y thick-section airfoil and a welded fuselage framework of chrome-molybdenum steel tubing. A departure from the all-wood structures found in other trainers, the structure proved sturdy and dependable. It was offered to the USAAS as a replacement for the Curtiss JN-4D trainer, with a choice of Le Rhone or Clerget rotary piston engines.

In 1922, the Army ordered three TA-3 (Trainer, Air-cooled, Type 3) machines for evaluation with the Le Rhone engine and dual controls. Evaluation showed that the type had the makings of a good trainer, but was somewhat lacking in power, so in 1923 Dayton-Wright modified one TA-3 with a more powerful 110 hp (82 kW) Le Rhone.

The USAAS then ordered ten examples of this improved model, and these were the last U.S. Army aircraft to be delivered with a rotary-engine. Appreciating that this type of power plant had passed its development peak, the USAAS then contracted for three examples of the TW-3 (Trainer, Water-cooled, Type 3) with a 150 hp (112 kW) Wright-Hispano I V8. The revised type clearly had greater long-term potential, and in June 1923 the USAAS contracted for 20 TW-3 production aircraft, together with enough spare parts for the construction of another three aircraft. At this time the General Motors Corporation was thinking of pulling out of the aircraft business and closing its Dayton-Wright subsidiary, so Reuben H. Fleet of the Gallaudet Aircraft Corporation secured rights to the Dayton-Wright trainer design. When Gallaudet shareholders expressed disapproval at this move, Fleet left the company and established the Consolidated Aircraft Corporation.

It was to this new company the TW-3 order went, and all the aircraft were delivered by the end of 1923 with the uprated powerplant of one Wright-Hispano E (license-built Hispano-Suiza 8) engine. Once the aircraft had entered service, Fleet continued to improve the TW-3, the most important change being the removal of the engine cowling to improve the occupants' forward and downward fields of vision. Visibility was still poor, so Fleet secured US Army permission to rebuild one TW-3 with a new, slimmer fuselage, providing tandem rather than side-by-side seating. This revised aircraft was generally known as the "Camel" due to the hump between its two cockpits.

The "Camel" may be regarded as the prototype of the Consolidated response to the USAAS's 1924 requirement for a new primary trainer. In the early summer of 1924, the USAAS tested a prototype unofficially designated TW-8 and placed an order for 50 examples of the Consolidated Model 1 production variant for service with the designation PT-1. Early production models had flat dorsal turtledecks, soon replaced by a faired version, and some of the first ones were likely built at the Gallaudet plant in Norwich before production began at Buffalo. The first 171 of the 221 produced used a streamlined nose radiator, the remainder used an un-faired installation. One PT-1 airframe was completed as XPT-2 with a 220 hp (164 kW) Wright J-5 radial engine.

== Operational history ==
The PT-1 became the first training airplane purchased by the USAAS in substantial quantity following World War I. Aviation cadets in Texas and California flew it extensively during the late 1920s and early 1930s. It acquired the nickname 'Trusty' for their excellent ability to make a quick and effective recovery from a spin. Easy to fly, the Trusty made some students overconfident, and they received a shock when they advanced to faster airplanes with more difficult handling characteristics. The 'Trusty' was commonly flown without its cowlings in an effort to prevent overheating

Whereas the TW-3 had supplemented the JN-4D, the PT-1 supplanted this wholly obsolescent type and was responsible for a radical improvement in the safety record of US Army pilot training. One of the aircraft was diverted to the US Navy for trials, and four other generally similar aircraft were delivered to Siam in 1928. From 1928 the PT-1 was replaced in frontline service by the Consolidated PT-3, but then became a valuable implement in the National Guard flying programme until retired in the early 1930s.

== Variants ==
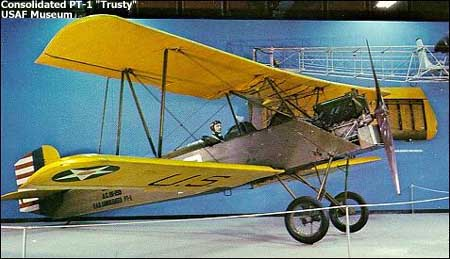
Consolidated PT-1 "Trusty" NMUSAF

TA-3
Dayton-Wright (Trainer, Air-cooled type 3), 13 built, 80 hp (60 kW) Le Rhone 9C rotary engine, wingspan 30 ft 11 in (9.4 m), Length 22 ft 7 in (6.9 m), gross weight 1,753 lb (795 kg)
TA-5
Single TA-3 with Lawrance J-1 engine used for tests of a single-wheel landing gear arrangement in 1923.
TW-3
Dayton-Wright (Trainer, Water-cooled type 3), two built, 150 hp (112-kW) Wright-Hispano I engine wingspan 34 ft 9 in (10.6 m), Length 25 ft 7 in (7.8 m), gross weight 2,447 lb (1019 kg)
TW-3
Consolidated (Trainer, Water-cooled type 3), 20 built, 180 hp (134 kW) Wright-Hispano E engine wingspan 34 ft 9 in (10.6 m), Length 26 ft 9 in (8.1 m), gross weight 2,407 lb (1,092 kg)
PT-1
Consolidated (Primary Trainer number 1), 221 built, 180 hp (134 kW) Wright-Hispano E (V-720) engine
XPT-2
PT-1 with 225 hp (168 kW) Wright R-790 (J-5) engine, wingspan 34 ft 7 in (10.5 m), Length 28 ft 4 in (8.6 m), gross weight 2,427 lb (1,100 kg)

== Operators ==
(Thailand) Siam

- Royal Thai Air Force

United States

- United States Army Air Service
- United States Navy
- United States National Guard

== Surviving aircraft ==
- 26-233 – PT-1 on static display at the National Museum of the United States Air Force in Dayton, Ohio. It was obtained from Ohio State University in 1957.
- 27-150 – PT-1 on static display at the San Diego Air & Space Museum in San Diego, California. It was purchased from Harry E. Kirk in Rushville, Indiana in 1978. After completing the work to put the aircraft on exhibit, it was donated to the Museum by the Atlas Hotels of San Diego.
- Reproduction – PT-3 airworthy at the EAA Aviation Museum in Oshkosh, Wisconsin using the wings, ailerons, center section and tail of a PT-1. It once flew with the 154th Observation Squadron of the Arkansas National Guard, was later owned by the University of Arkansas College of Engineering and was rebuilt with a J-5 Engine used on PT-3 models.

== Specifications (PT-1) ==
Data from Eden & Moeng (2002)

General characteristics

- Crew: 2
- Length: 27 ft 9.25 in (8.4646 m)
- Wingspan: 34 ft 5.5 in (10.503 m)
- Height: 9 ft 10 in (3.00 m)
- Wing area: 284 sq ft (26.4 m^{2})
- Airfoil: Clark Y
- Empty weight: 1,805 lb (819 kg)
- Gross weight: 2,577 lb (1,169 kg)
- Powerplant: 1 × Wright-Hispano E V-8 water-cooled piston engine, 180 hp (130 kW)
- Propellers: 2-bladed fixed-pitch propeller

Performance

- Maximum speed: 92 mph (148 km/h, 80 kn) at sea level
- Cruise speed: 79 mph (127 km/h, 69 kn)
- Range: 350 mi (560 km, 300 nmi)
- Service ceiling: 13,450 ft (4,100 m)
- Rate of climb: 690 ft/min (3.5 m/s)
