= Simmonds Aerocessories OQ-11 =

American WWII target drone

OQ-11

General information
- Type: Target drone
- National origin: United States
- Manufacturer: Simmonds Aerocessories
- Primary user: USAAF
- Number built: 1

History
- First flight: 1941

The Simmonds Aerocessories OQ-11 was a target drone in the United States, manufactured by Simmonds Aerocessories.

The OQ-11 remained a prototype only.

== Specifications ==
General characteristics

- Crew: none
- Length: 9 ft 0 in (2.7 m)
- Wingspan: 12 ft 0 in (3.6 m)
- Powerplant: 1 × Herkimer , 7 hp (5 kW)

Performance

- Maximum speed: 60 mph (100 km/h, 52 kn)
- Endurance: 1 hours 0 minutes

== See also ==
Related lists

- List of military aircraft of the United States
