= Curtiss O-24 =

American observation aircraft proposal

O-24

General information
- Type: Observation
- National origin: United States
- Manufacturer: Curtiss-Wright
- Status: Canceled
- Number built: 0

The Curtiss O-24 was a proposed observation aircraft designed by Curtiss-Wright. It was to have been powered by a single Pratt & Whitney R-1340 Wasp radial engine, however, the project was canceled before any aircraft were built.
