= Fokker D.XVI =

Sesquiplane fighter aircraft

D.XVI
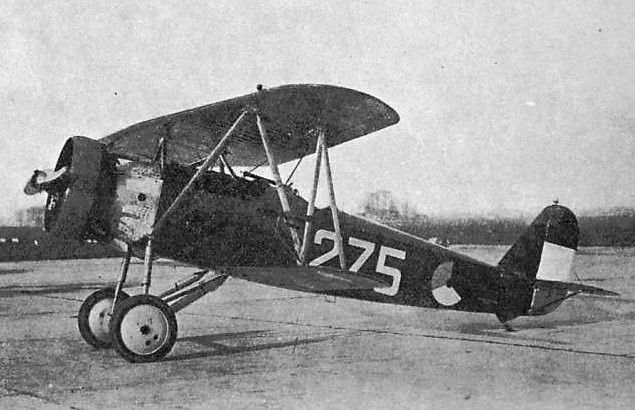

General information
- Type: Fighter
- National origin: Netherlands
- Manufacturer: Fokker
- Primary user: Royal Netherlands Army
- Number built: 22

History
- Manufactured: 1930-1934
- First flight: July 1929
- Retired: 1939
- Variant: Fokker D.XVII

The Fokker D.XVI (sometimes written as Fokker D.16) was a sesquiplane fighter aircraft developed in the Netherlands in the late 1920s.

== Development ==
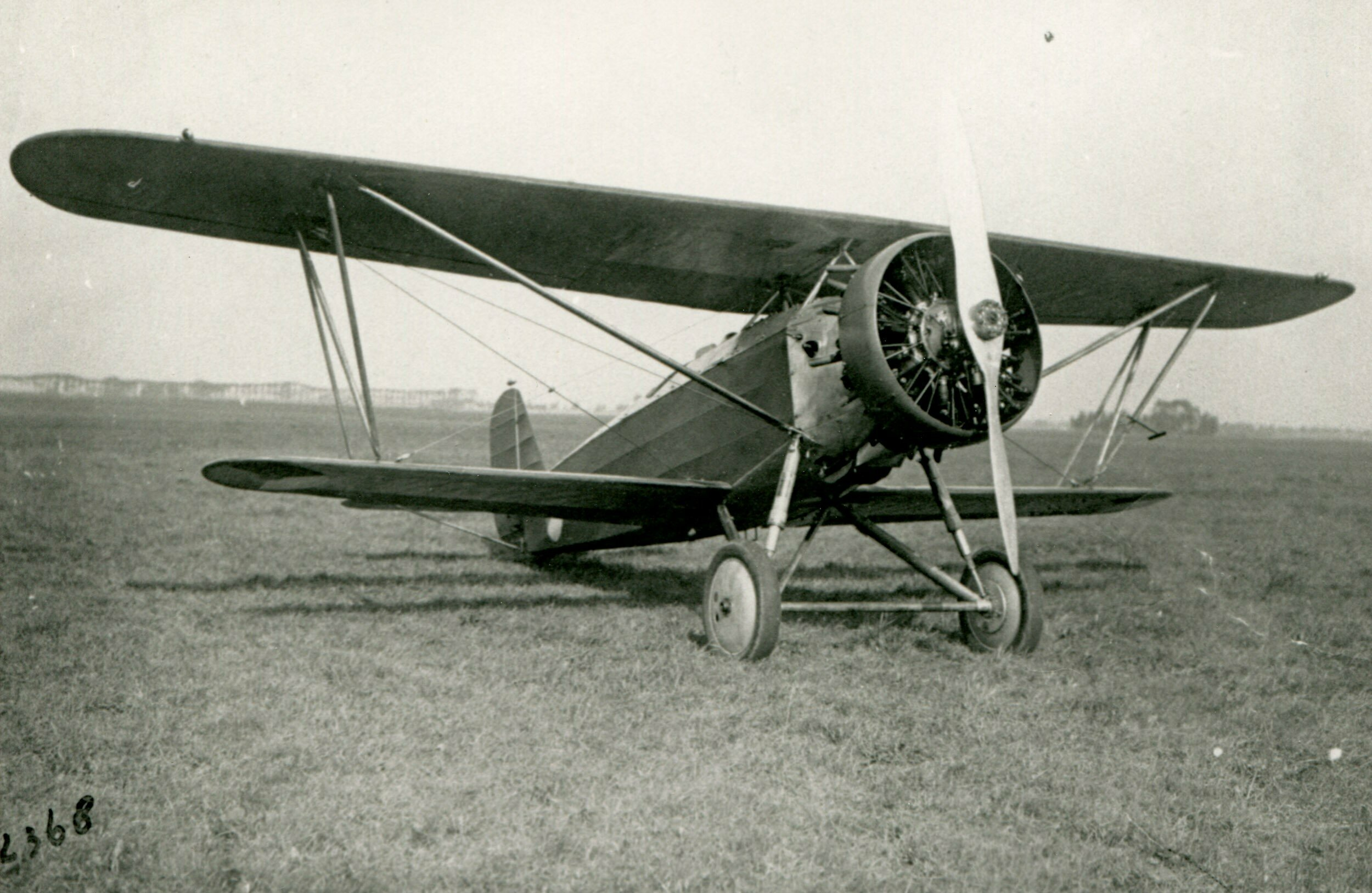
D.XVI prototype in 1929.

The Fokker D.XVI was a conventional, single-bay sesquiplane with staggered wings braced with V-struts. It featured an open cockpit and fixed undercarriage with a tailskid. The wings were made up of wood spars and ribs with a plywood covering, while the fuselage was of steel tube construction with a fabric covering. Power was provided by an Armstrong Siddeley Jaguar radial engine fitted with a Townend ring.

== Operational history ==
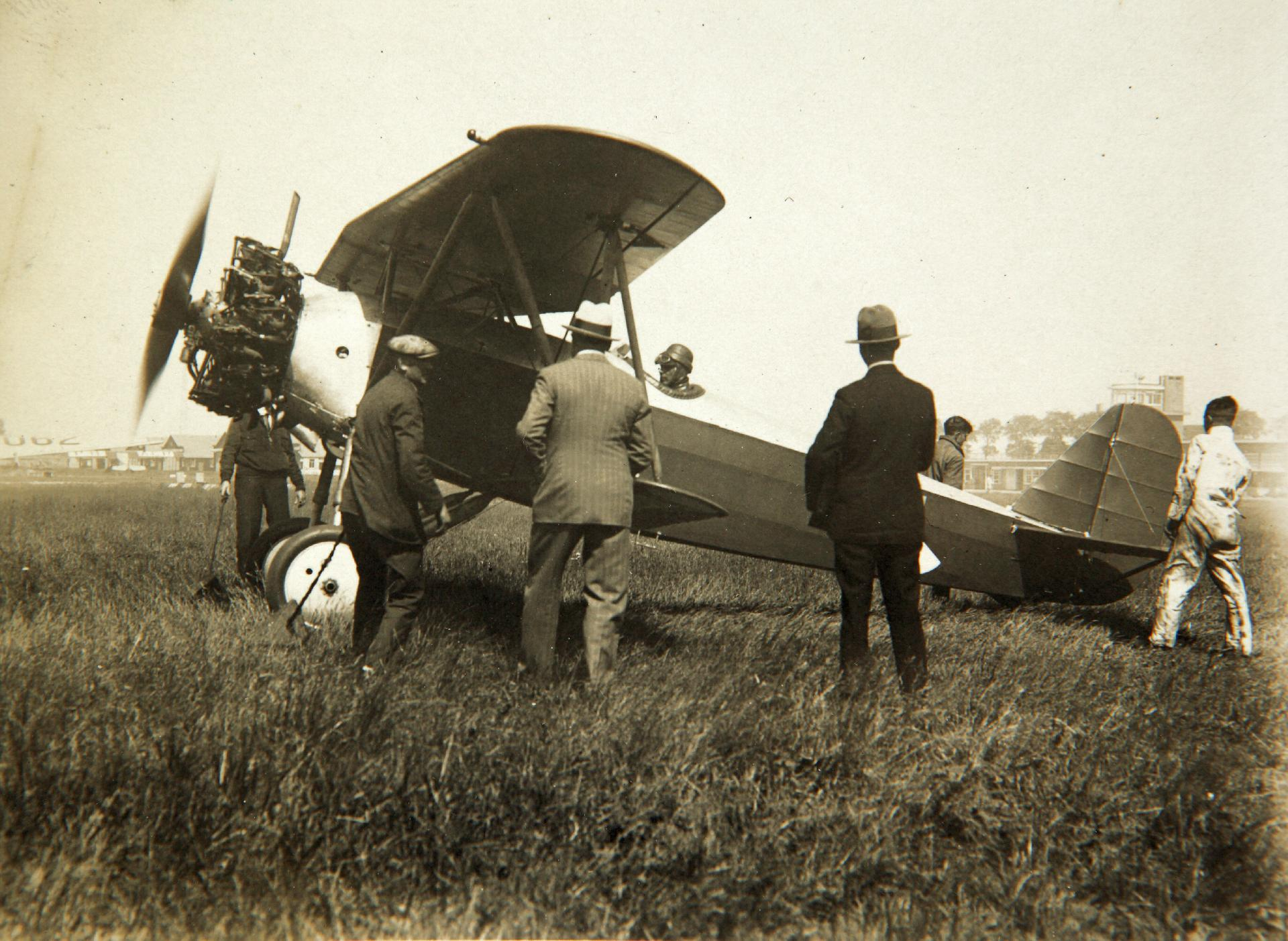
Fokker D.XVI

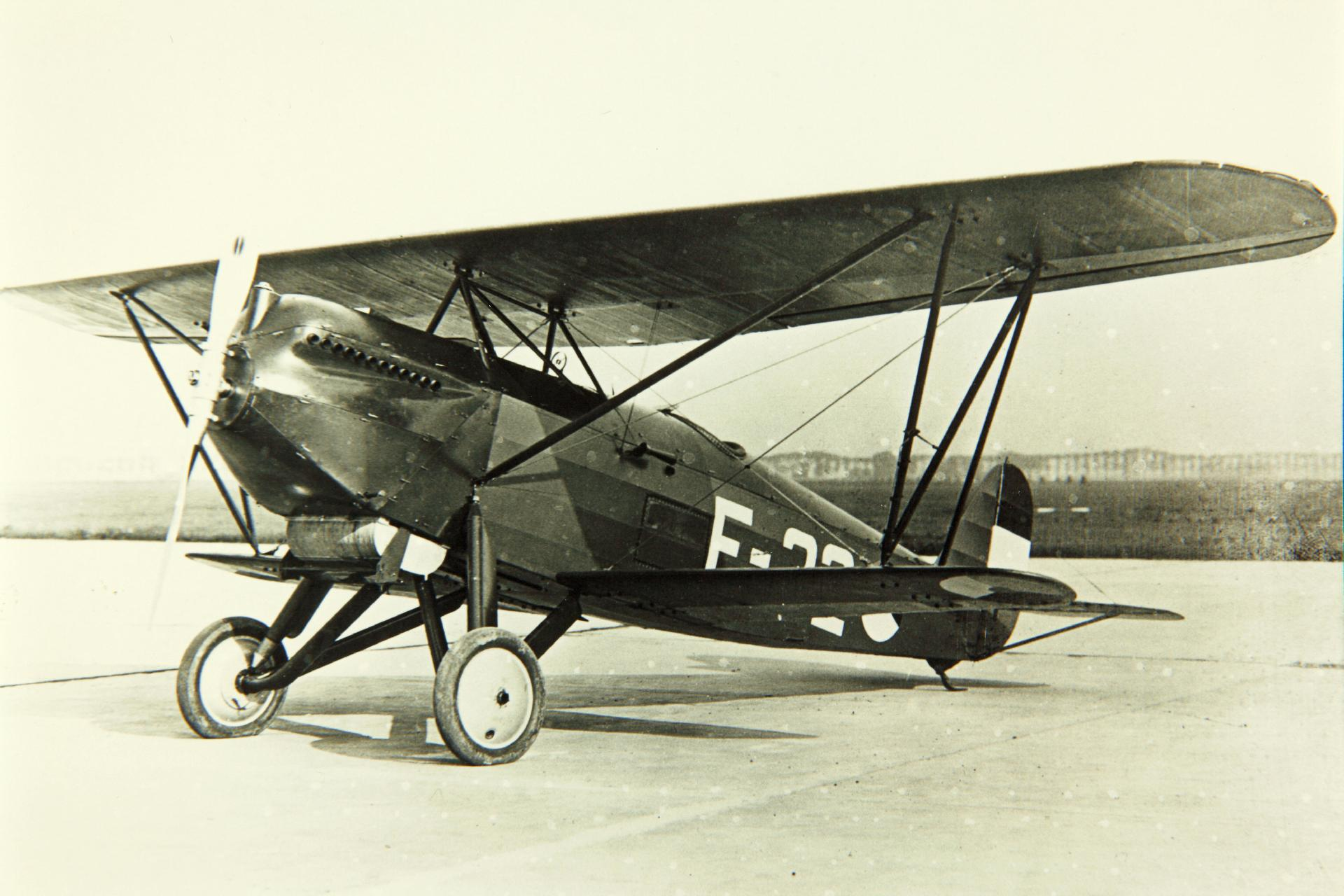
Royal Netherlands East Indies Army Fokker D.XVI with Curtiss V-1570 engine.

The Royal Netherlands Army ordered 14 aircraft, which differed from the prototype in having divided main undercarriage units in place of the prototype's cross-axle. Hungary purchased four aircraft with Gnome et Rhône-built Bristol Jupiter engines in place of the Armstrong Siddeley Jaguar engines used on the Dutch machines. Evaluation aircraft were also provided to China, Italy, Romania and the Royal Netherlands East Indies Army. The Royal Netherlands East Indies Army machine was powered by a Curtiss V-1570, which crashed in March 1931 at Schiphol. The D.XVI also won a competition organised by the government of Romania to select a new fighter, but despite this, no orders were placed. One Dutch Army aircraft was given to Romania. In lieu of the radial-engined D.XVI, Fokker manufactured the similar Fokker D.XVII powered with an inline engine. One example was fitted with a three-bladed propeller and a full-chord NACA cowling.

== Operators ==
Republic of China

- Republic of China Air Force (RoCAF) - evaluation only

Hungary

- Royal Hungarian Air Force - two aircraft

Italy

- Regia Aeronautica - evaluation only

Netherlands

- Royal Netherlands Air Force
- Royal Netherlands East Indies Army - evaluation only

Romania

- Royal Romanian Air Force - evaluation only

== Specifications ==
Data from

General characteristics

- Crew: One pilot
- Length: 7.34 m (24 ft 1 in)
- Upper wingspan: 9.40 m (30 ft 10 in)
- Lower wingspan: 7.12 m (23 ft 4 in)
- Height: 2.70 m (8 ft 10 in)
- Wing area: 18.5 m^{2} (199 sq ft)
- Empty weight: 1,005 kg (2,216 lb)
- Gross weight: 1,475 kg (3,252 lb)
- Powerplant: 1 × Armstrong Siddeley Jaguar 14-cylinder two-row air cooled radial engine, 340 kW (460 hp)
- Propellers: 2-bladed

Performance

- Maximum speed: 320 km/h (200 mph, 170 kn)
- Range: 640 km (400 mi, 350 nmi)
- Endurance: 3.5 hours

Armament

- Guns: 2 × fixed, forward-firing 7.9 mm (.31 in) Vickers M20 machine guns, later replaced with FN Browning machine guns, in forward fuselage
