= Fokker D.XVII =

1930s Dutch biplane fighter

D.XVII
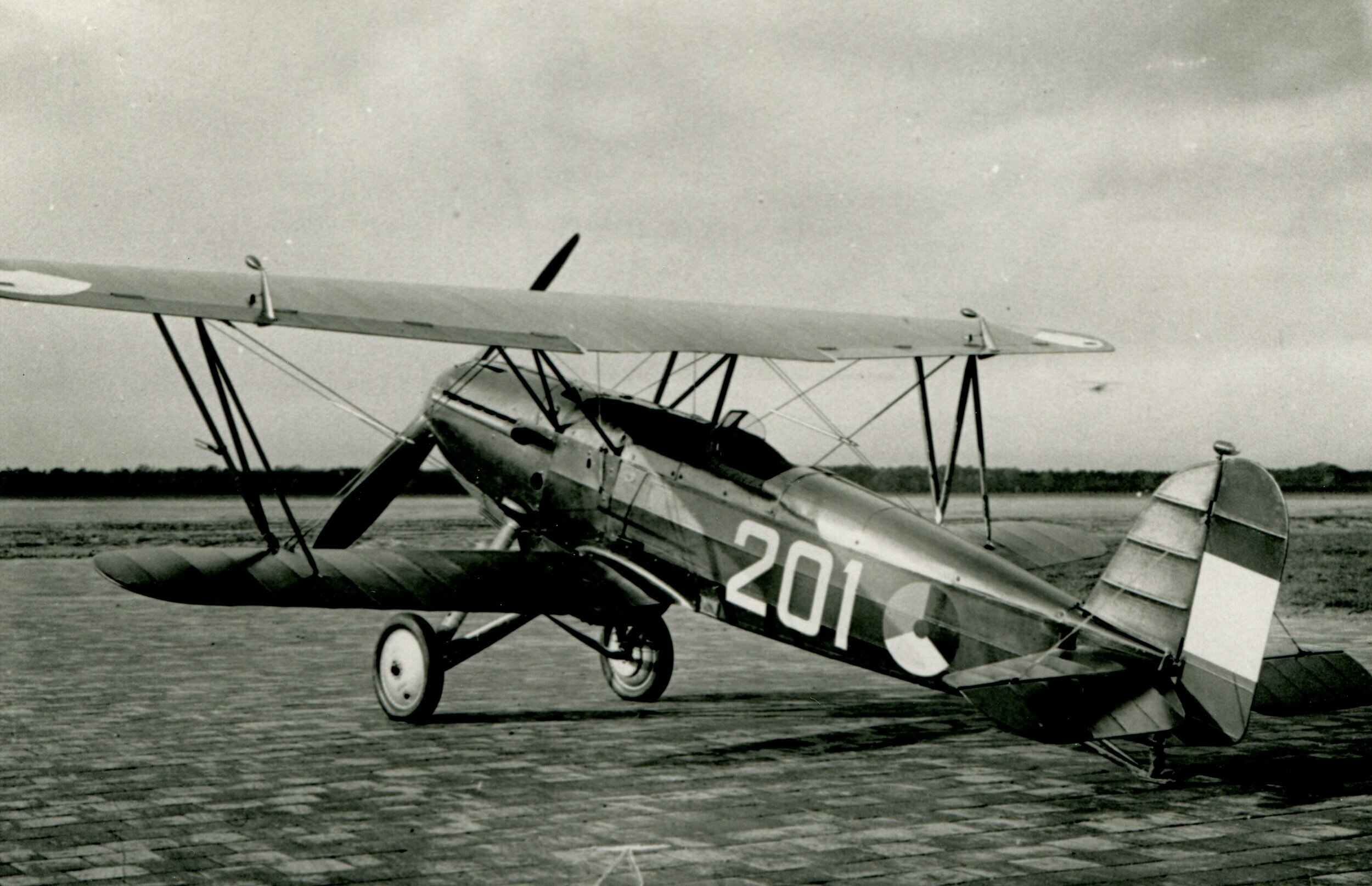

General information
- Type: Fighter/Trainer aircraft
- National origin: Netherlands
- Manufacturer: Fokker
- Primary user: Royal Netherlands Air Force
- Number built: 11 plus 1 prototype converted from a D.XVI

History
- Manufactured: 1932-1934
- First flight: 27 November 1931
- Retired: 1940
- Developed from: Fokker D.XVI

Fokker D.XVII (sometimes written as Fokker D.17), was a 1930s Dutch sesquiplane developed by Fokker. It was the last fabric-covered biplane fighter they developed in a lineage that extended back to the First World War Fokker D.VII.

== Design and development ==
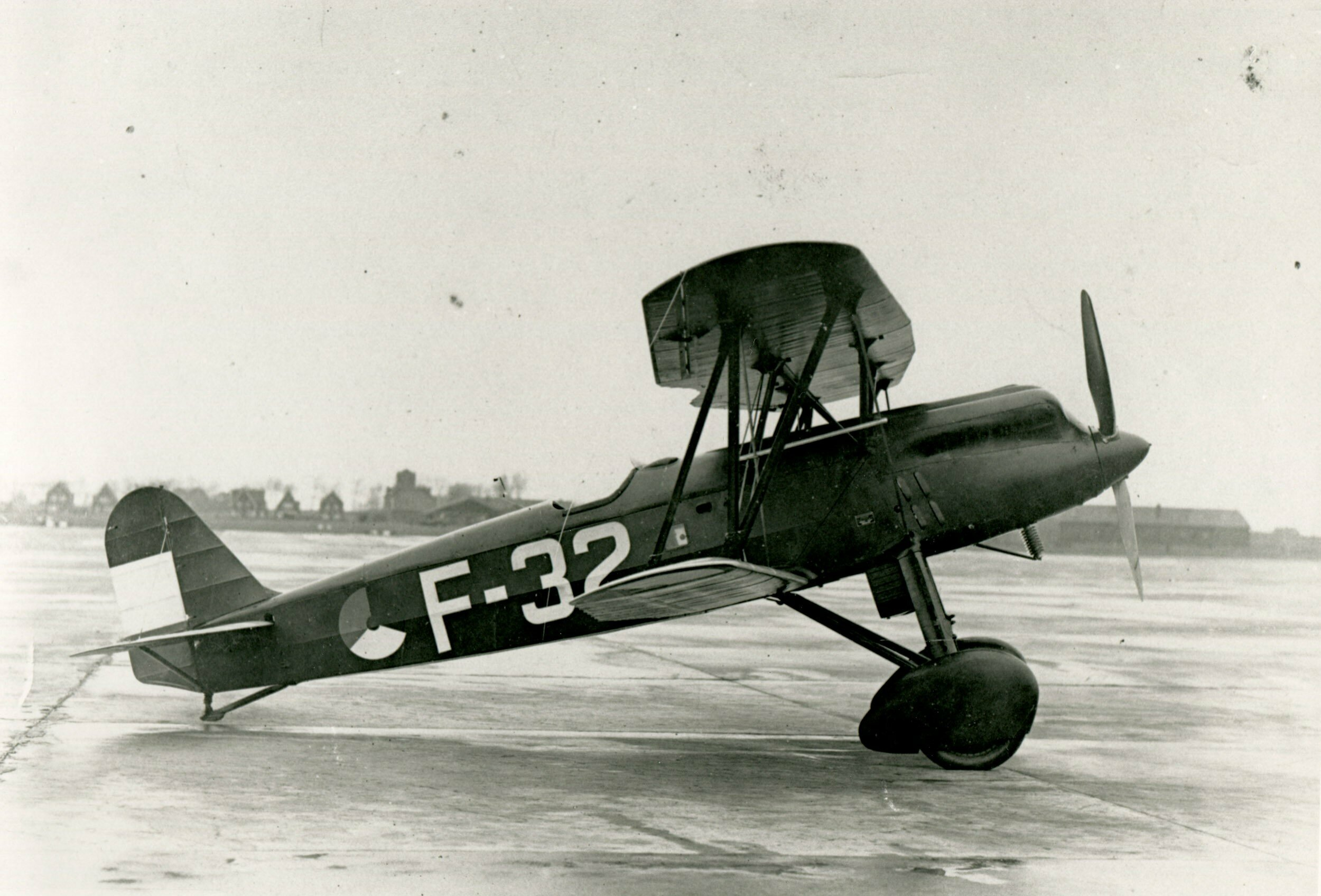
The Curtiss Conqueror powered D.XVII prototype.

Problems with severe vibration in the Armstrong Siddeley Jaguar radial engine on the Fokker D.XVI resulted in one being converted to use a normally aspirated 500 hp (370 kW) Curtiss Conqueror V-1570 V-twelve, becoming the prototype for the D.XVII. Production versions were fitted with a 600 hp (450 kW) Rolls-Royce Kestrel, while one aircraft was built with a 790 hp (590 kW) Lorraine Pétrel and another was built with a 690 hp (510 kW) Hispano-Suiza 12Xbrs for comparison purposes. Structure was standard for Fokkers throughout the 1920s. The sesquiplane's fuselage was welded steel tube with fabric covering and the wings were made with wood spars and ribs covered with plywood.

== Operational history ==
On 18 January 1935, Lieutenant René Wittert van Hoogland set a Dutch high-altitude record in a Fokker D.XVII of 10,180 m (33,400 ft) while using oxygen and high octane fuel.

By May 1939, the aircraft was obsolete and remaining examples were transferred to the LVA Flying School for fighter pilot training however they saw some action during the Battle of the Netherlands, escorting Fokker C.Vs and C.Xs on bombing missions. When the Netherlands surrendered to the Germans, all surviving aircraft were set on fire.

Airspeed Ltd. had a licence to build Fokker aircraft in England and considered making the Fokker D.XVII fighter for Greece under the designation Airspeed AS.17. Greek government interest was constrained by currency concerns. Nevil Shute and a Fokker representative "who was well accustomed to methods of business in the Balkans" spent three weeks in Athens but they did not close the deal.

== Operators ==
Netherlands

- Royal Netherlands Air Force
- Royal Netherlands East Indies Army - one example

== Specifications (Fokker D.XVII) ==
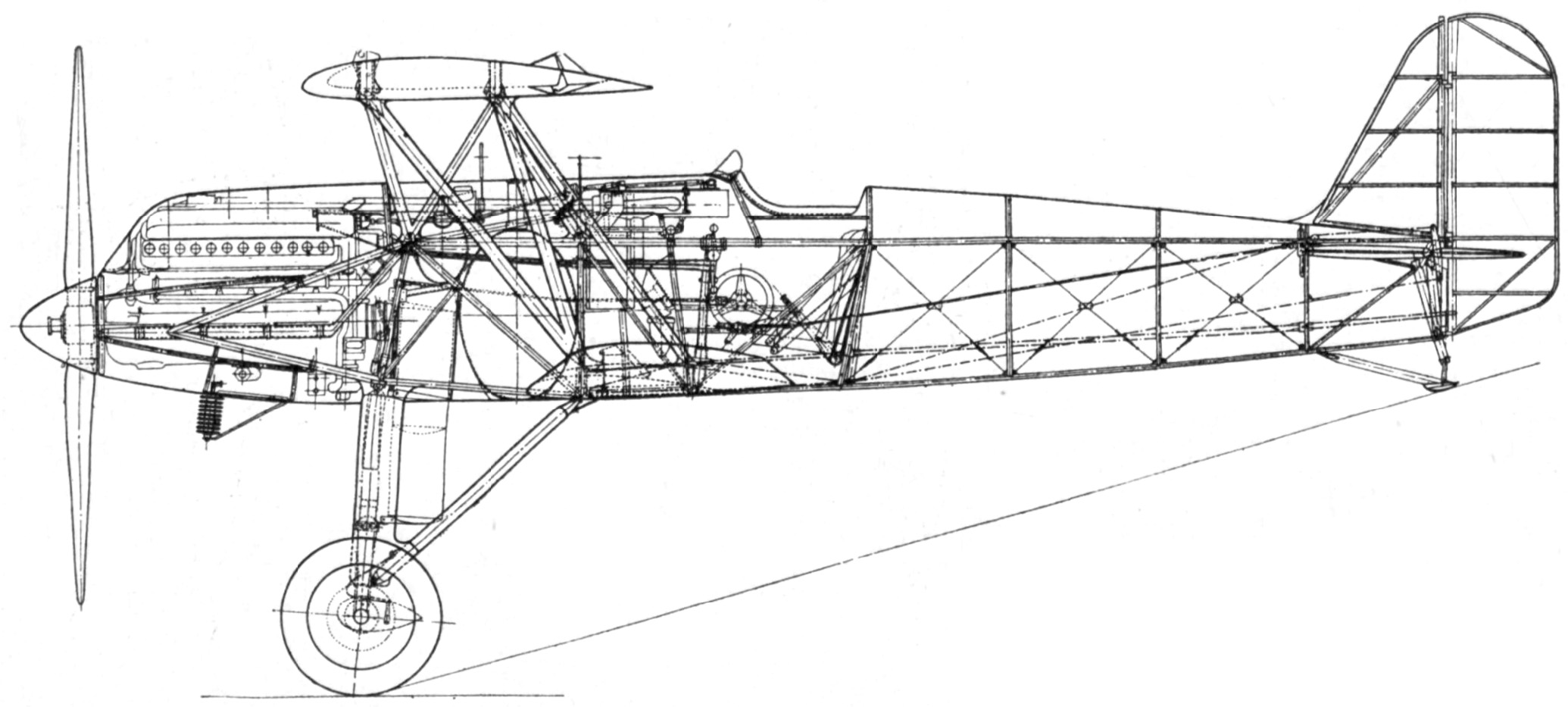
Drawing of Fokker D.XVII prototype with Curtiss Conqueror engine.

Data from L'avion de chasse Fokker D XVII (Hollande) and A Dutch Fighter

General characteristics

- Crew: One
- Length: 7.20 m (23 ft 7 in)
- Upper wingspan: 9.60 m (31 ft 6 in)
- Height: 3.00 m (9 ft 10 in)
- Wing area: 20.0 m^{2} (215 sq ft)
- Empty weight: 1,120 kg (2,469 lb)
- Gross weight: 1,500 kg (3,307 lb)
- Fuel capacity: 190 L (42 imp gal; 50 US gal)
- Powerplant: 1 × Rolls-Royce Kestrel IIS liquid-cooled V-12, 482 kW (646 hp) 655 CV @ 3,500 m (11,500 ft), .68 gear ratio.
- Propellers: 2-bladed

Performance

- Maximum speed: 345 km/h (214 mph, 186 kn)
- Cruise speed: 290 km/h (186 mph, 162 kn)
- Range: 660 km (410 mi, 360 nmi)
- Service ceiling: 9,400 m (31,000 ft)
- Time to altitude:
  - 2.8 minutes to 2,000 m (6,600 ft)
  - 5.7 minutes to 4,000 m (13,000 ft)
  - 10 minutes to 6,000 m (20,000 ft)
  - 18 minutes to 8,000 m (26,000 ft)
  - 29 minutes to 9,000 m (30,000 ft)
- Wing loading: 75 kg/m^{2} (15 lb/sq ft)
- Power/mass: 0.195 hp/lb (0.321 kW/kg)

Armament

- Guns: 2 × FN-Browning M.36 7.92 mm (0.31 in) machine guns

== See also ==
Aircraft of comparable role, configuration, and era

- Hawker Fury
- Curtiss Hawk I
