= Consolidated P-30 =

American two-seat fighter

P-30 (PB-2)
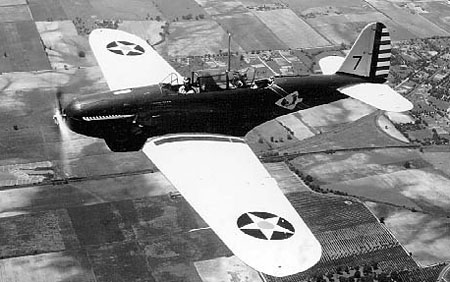
- Consolidated P-30

General information
- Type: Fighter aircraft
- National origin: United States
- Manufacturer: Consolidated Aircraft
- Status: Retired
- Primary user: United States Army Air Corps
- Number built: 60

History
- First flight: January 1934

The Consolidated P-30 (PB-2) was a 1930s United States two-seat fighter aircraft. An attack version called the A-11 was also built, along with 2 Y1P-25 prototypes and YP-27, Y1P-28, and XP-33 proposals. The P-30 is significant for being the first fighter in United States Army Air Corps service to have retractable landing gear, an enclosed and heated cockpit for the pilot, and an exhaust-driven turbo-supercharger for altitude operation.

== Design and development ==
In 1931, the Detroit Aircraft Corporation, parent company of the Lockheed Aircraft Company, built a two-seat single-engined fighter aircraft based on the Lockheed Altair high-speed transport as a private venture. The prototype, the Detroit-Lockheed XP-900, flew in September 1931 and was purchased by the United States Army Air Corps as the Lockheed YP-24. It had impressive performance, being faster than any fighter then in service with the Air Corps, and an order for five Y1P-24 fighters and four Y1A-9 attack aircraft was placed for the new aircraft, despite the loss of the prototype on 19 October 1931. The Detroit Aircraft Corporation went into bankruptcy eight days later, however, leading to the cancellation of the contract.

When the Detroit Aircraft Corporation failed, the chief designer of the YP-24, Robert J. Woods was hired by Consolidated Aircraft. Woods continued to develop the YP-24, the design becoming the Consolidated Model 25, with all-metal wings replacing the wooden wings of the YP-24 and with a larger tail. The Army Air Corps ordered two prototypes as the Y1P-25 in March 1932, to be powered by a Curtiss V-1570-27, fitted with a turbo-supercharger on the port side of the forward fuselage. The order for the second prototype was quickly changed to a Y1A-11 attack aircraft, omitting the supercharger.

First to fly was the Y1P-25, which was delivered to the Air Corps on 9 December 1932. It demonstrated promising performance, reaching a speed of 247 miles per hour (398 km/h) at 15,000 feet (4,600 m), but was destroyed in a crash on 13 January 1933, killing its pilot, Capt. Hugh M. Elmendorf (whose name was later given to Elmendorf Air Base in Alaska).

The Y1A-11, armed with four forward-firing machine guns instead of the two of the Y1P-25 and racks for 400 lb (180 kg) of bombs, was delivered to Wright Field on 5 January 1933. On 20 January 1933, the Y1A-11 disintegrated in midair, killing pilot Lt. Irvin A. Woodring. Despite the loss of both prototypes in a week, on 1 March 1933, the Air Corps placed an order for four P-30 fighters and four A-11 attack aircraft. These production variants differed from the prototypes in having stronger fuselages, simplified undercarriages and more powerful engines.

== Operational history ==
The first P-30 was delivered in January 1934. Testing showed that the gunner's cockpit was uncomfortable and cold at the high altitudes where the P-30 was intended to fight, while the rearward-facing gunners were liable to black out when the aircraft was maneuvered. Despite these concerns, on 6 December 1934, the U.S. Air Corps placed an order for a further 50 P-30As, with more powerful V-1570-61 engines driving a three-bladed variable-pitch propeller and with oxygen supplies for the crew.

Three of the four P-30s were delivered to the 94th Pursuit Squadron at Selfridge Field in 1934. The first P-30A, by this time redesignated PB-2A (pursuit, biplace), made its maiden flight on 17 December 1935, with deliveries to service units starting on 28 April 1936. The last of the 50 PB-2As were completed by August that year.

While intended as a high altitude fighter, the PB-2 flew relatively few high-altitude flights, partly because of the discomfort for the crew. One exception took place in March 1937, when a PB-2A was flown to 39,300 feet (12,000 m) before being forced to return to lower altitudes when the aircraft's controls froze. On 17 October 1936, a PB-2A flown by Lt. John M. Sterling won the Mitchell Trophy air race with a speed of 217.5 miles per hour (350.0 km/h). Since the PB-2A was one of the few aircraft at the time to have retractable landing gear, they were frequently damaged in "wheels-up" landings when the pilots forgot to extend the landing gear.

One PB-2A was modified to a single-seat configuration as the PB-2A Special, to compete in a 1936 Air Corps competition for a new fighter to replace the Boeing P-26 Peashooter. It was larger and heavier than the other competitors and was much more expensive. It crashed during testing, with the Seversky P-35 being ordered into production. One A-11 was converted to the XA-11A testbed with the new 1,000 hp (750 kW) Allison XV-1710-7 engine.

While the PB-2 was sturdy, the two-seat fighter concept was obsolete by the time the aircraft entered service, and by 1939, all had been replaced in front-line service by Seversky P-35 and Curtiss P-36 Hawk aircraft. The survivors remained in use as training aircraft until after the start of World War II, with the last being withdrawn from use on 2 June 1942.

== Variants ==
Y1P-25
Further development of Lockheed YP-24 with all-metal wing, 600 hp (450 kW) Curtiss V-1570-27 Conqueror turbo-supercharged engine. Two fixed forward firing .30 in machine guns and one flexibly mounted gun in rear cockpit. One built.
Y1A-11
Ground-attack version of Y1P-25. Powered by unsupercharged engine and armament of 4 forward-firing .30 in guns in nose, one in rear cockpit and up to 400 lb (180 kg) of bombs. One built.
YP-27
Proposed variant of Y1P-25 with a 550 hp (410 kW) Pratt & Whitney R-1340-21G Wasp radial engine. Unbuilt.
Y1P-28
Proposed variant of Y1P-25 with a 600 hp (450 kW) R-1340-19 Wasp; unbuilt.
P-30
Initial production batch for Army Air Corps. 675 hp (503 kW) Curtiss V-1570-57 turbo-supercharged engine. Four built, later redesignated PB-2.

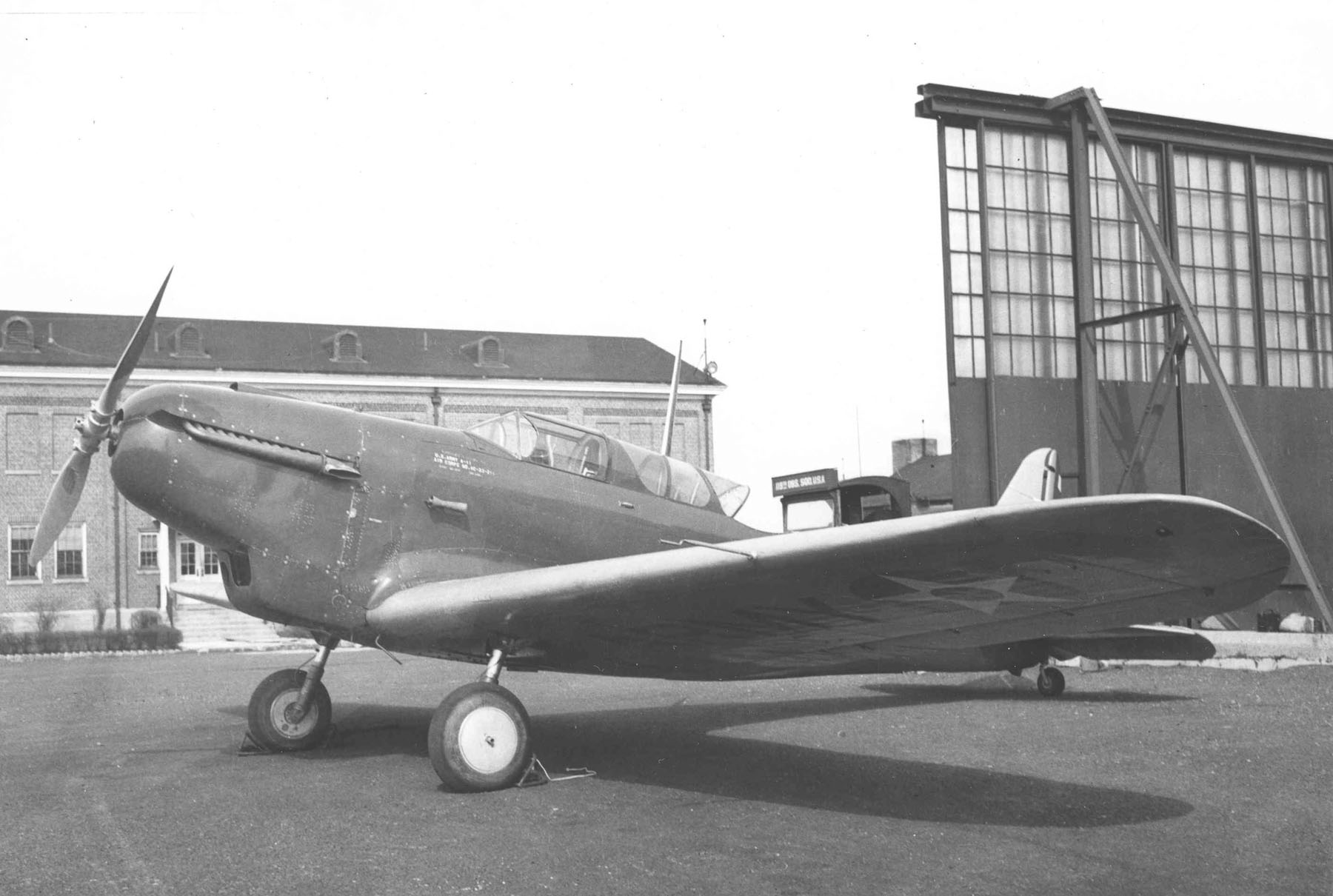
The last of the four Consolidated A-11s

A-11
Initial production ground-attack aircraft, with unsupercharged V-1570-59 engine. Four built.
P-30A
Main production fighter powered by a 700 hp (520 kW) turbo-supercharged Curtiss V-1570-61 engine; 50 built, redesignated PB-2A.

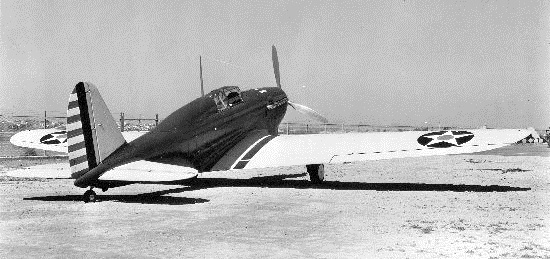
The PB-2A Special

PB-2A Special
Seventh PB-2A modified to single-seat configuration. Crashed during flight testing.
XP-33
Proposed version with a 800 hp (600 kW) Pratt & Whitney R-1830-1 Twin Wasp engine; unbuilt.
XA-11A
Conversion of A-11 as testbed for 1,000 hp (750 kW) Allison XV-1710-7. One converted by Bell Aircraft, who referred to it as their Model 2.

== Specifications (PB-2A) ==
Data from Singular Two-Seater

General characteristics

- Crew: two
- Length: 30 ft 0 in (9.14 m)
- Wingspan: 43 ft 11 in (13.38 m)
- Height: 8 ft 3 in (2.51 m)
- Wing area: 297 sq ft (27.6 m^{2})
- Empty weight: 4,306 lb (1,950 kg)
- Gross weight: 5,623 lb (2,556 kg)
- Powerplant: 1 × Curtiss V-1570-61 Conqueror liquid-cooled V12 engine, 700 hp (520 kW)

Performance

- Maximum speed: 275 mph (443 km/h, 239 kn) at 25,000 ft (7,600 m)
- Cruise speed: 215 mph (346 km/h, 187 kn) at 15,000 ft (4,600 m)
- Range: 508 mi (818 km, 442 nmi)
- Service ceiling: 28,000 ft (8,530 m)
- Climb to 15,000 ft (4,600 m): 7 min 48 s

Armament

- Guns:
  - 2 × 0.30 in (7.62 mm) machine guns firing through the propeller
  - 1 × 0.30 in (7.62 mm) machine gun in the rear cockpit
- Bombs: 170 lb (77 kg) bombs

== See also ==
Related development

- Lockheed YP-24

Aircraft of comparable role, configuration, and era

- Fairey Battle

Related lists

- List of fighter aircraft
- List of military aircraft of the United States

== Bibliography ==
- Angelucci, Enzo. and Peter M. Bowers. The American Fighter. New York: Orion Books, 1987. ISBN 0-517-56588-9.
- Dorr, Robert F. and David Donald. Fighters of the United States Air Force. London: Temple Press/Aerospace, 1990. ISBN 0-600-55094-X
- Francillon, René J. Lockheed Aircraft since 1913. London: Putnam, 1982. ISBN 0-370-30329-6.
- Green, William and Gordon Swanborough. "The end of the beginning ... The Seversky P-35". Air Enthusiast Ten, July–September 1979, pp. 8–21.
- Pelletier, Alain J. "Singular Two-Seater: Consolidated's PB-2A – The USAAC's Only Two-Seat Fighter". Air Enthusiast No. 85, January/February 2000, pp. 2–11. ISSN 0143-5450.
- Swanborough, Gordon and Peter M. Bowers. United States Military Aircraft Since 1909. Washington, D.C.: Smithsonian, 1989. ISBN 0-87474-880-1.
- Wegg, John. General Dynamics Aircraft and their Predecessors. London: Putnam, 1990. ISBN 0-85177-833-X.
