= Curtiss Model 53 Condor =

Passenger airplane

Condor
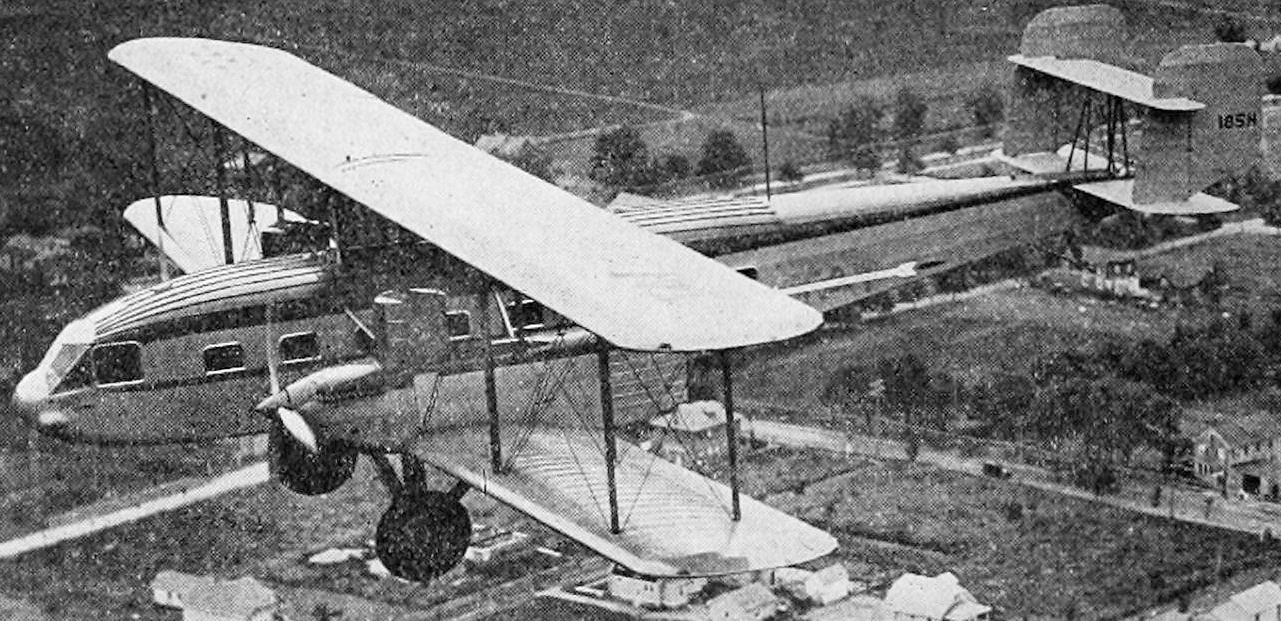

General information
- Type: 18 seat airliner
- National origin: US
- Manufacturer: Curtiss Aeroplane and Motor Company
- Number built: 6

History
- First flight: 21 July 1929
- Developed from: Curtiss B-2 Condor

The 1929 Curtiss Model 53 Condor, also known as the Curtiss Model 53 Condor 18 or the Curtiss CO Condor, was a civil passenger version of the Model 52 Condor bomber. A twin-engined biplane, it carried 18 passengers.

== Design and development ==
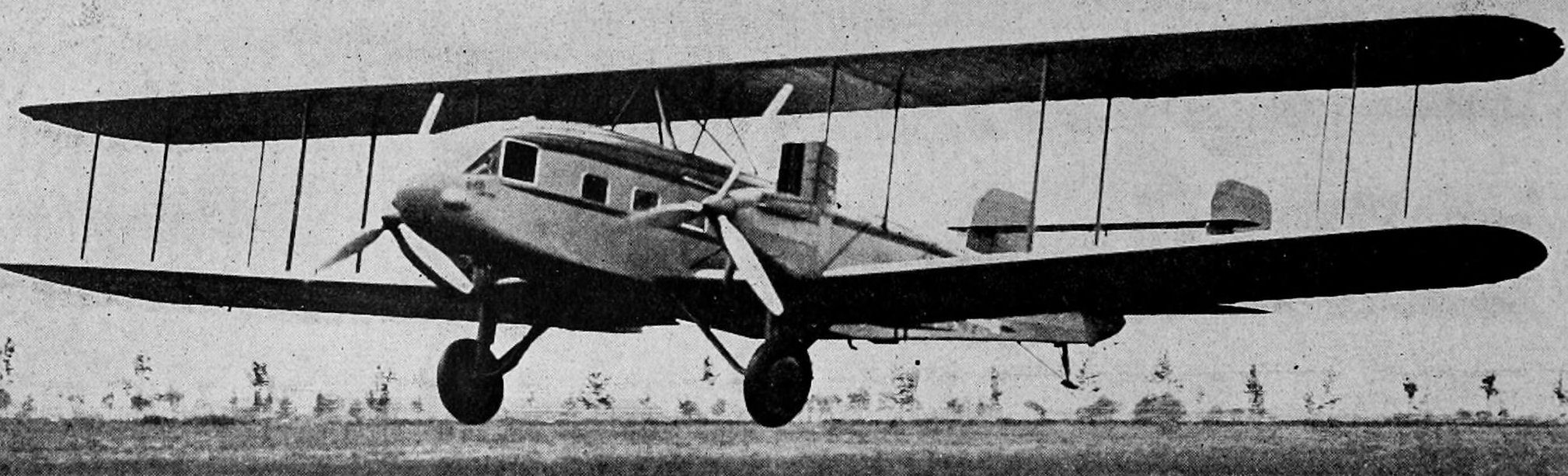

The Model 53 was an airliner version of the Model 52 Condor B-2 bomber, also introduced in 1929. It was a large, equal span, three bay biplane with parallel pairs of interplane struts. Its wings had a rectangular plan out to rounded tips. Like the rest of the aircraft, they had an all-metal structure and were fabric covered. The first three Model 53s were modified B-2s on which only the lower wing was set with dihedral (5°); the three built from scratch had dihedral on both wings. There were ailerons on both upper and lower wings, externally connected.

Its two 635 hp (474 kW) Curtiss Conqueror pressurized water-cooled V-12 engines were mounted on top of the lower wing in long cowlings. Geared down from an engine optimum 2,400 rpm by a factor of two, they drove three-bladed propellers. They were cooled by longitudinally oriented, rectangular profile radiators proud above each cowling. Their nacelles were long, extending beyond the trailing edges, containing the fuel tanks behind the engines and, unusually, baggage holds at their rears.

The Condor had a rectangular section fuselage. The flight crew of two sat side-by-side in an enclosed cabin entered by built-in ladder and floor hatch. The normal arrangement in the passenger cabin behind them, high enough for a tall passenger to stand upright, was six rows of three seats accessed by a side aisle. These could be subdivided by screens for privacy or modified to contain a sleeper cabin with berths for four; for night flights a twelve berth all sleeper configuration was proposed. Particular attention was given to sound insulation and to ventilation; the Condor was the first airliner to feature cabin steam heating. The flight attendant had a space at the rear, where there was also a toilet.

The lower tailplane of the Condor's biplane tail unit was mounted on top of the fuselage with the upper one held above it by the twin fins and central struts. Its rudders were generous and balanced.

The Condor had a fixed, conventional, wide track landing gear Its independent wheels, equipped with brakes, were on short vertical legs and had trailing drag struts from the engine mountings and transverse struts to the central fuselage underside. Its tailskid was tall and sprung.

== Operational history ==
The first civil Condor, converted from a military Model 52, flew for the first time on 21 July 1929. Including the prototype, six were built. Of these, the first three were converted from bomber model 52s. They operated with TAT and Eastern Air Line, though only for about a year. The Conqueror's development was never quite completed and in 1932 the US Army, after spending large sums on it, withdrew support and turned to air-cooled engines.

In 1935, following their service with the airlines, Clarence Chamberlain bought four Condors for use as barnstormers, flying from airport to airport, giving many passengers their first airplane flights. Two of the Condors crashed, one in October 1935 and one in August 1936, and he retired the remaining two in 1939.

== Operators ==
- Transcontinental Air Transport
- Eastern Air Lines

== Specifications (CO Condor) ==
Data from Jane's All the World's Aircraft 1931, Aero Digest : Curtiss Condor

General characteristics

- Crew: 2 pilots and 1 attendant
- Capacity: 18 passengers / 3,800 lb (1,724 kg)
- Length: 55 ft 9 in (16.99 m)
- Wingspan: 91 ft 9.5 in (27.978 m)
- Height: 18 ft (5.5 m)
- Wing area: 1,512 sq ft (140.5 m^{2})
- Airfoil: Curtiss C-72
- Empty weight: 11,674 lb (5,295 kg)
- Fuel capacity: 444 US gal (370 imp gal; 1,681 L) maximum fuel; 38 US gal (32 imp gal; 144 L) oil (1,916 lb (869 kg), including oil)
- Dihedral (upper): 0°
- Dihedral (lower): 5°
- Payload: 3,600 lb (1,600 kg)
- Powerplant: 2 × Curtiss GV-1570 Conqueror V-12 water-cooled piston engine, 635 hp (474 kW) each at 2,400 rpm with 2:1 reduction gear
- Propellers: 3-bladed Curtiss-Reid adjustable-pitch Duralumin propellers

Performance

- Maximum speed: 145.2 mph (233.7 km/h, 126.2 kn) at sea level

142 mph (123 kn; 229 km/h) at 5,000 ft (1,524 m)
137 mph (119 kn; 220 km/h) at 10,000 ft (3,048 m)
126.2 mph (110 kn; 203 km/h) at 15,000 ft (4,572 m)

- Cruise speed: 116 mph (187 km/h, 101 kn)
- Landing speed: 49 mph (79 km/h; 43 kn)
- Range: 500 mi (800 km, 430 nmi) with normal fuel load

800 mi (695 nmi; 1,287 km) with maximum fuel

- Endurance: 5 hrs at cruising speed
- Service ceiling: 17,000 ft (5,200 m)
- Absolute ceiling: 19,200 ft (5,852 m)
- Rate of climb: 870 ft/min (4.4 m/s)
- Time to altitude:

- 5,000 ft (1,524 m) in 6 minutes 48 seconds
- 10,000 ft (3,048 m) in 16 minutes 18 seconds
- 15,000 ft (4,572 m) in 33 minutes 48 seconds

- Wing loading: 11.8 lb/sq ft (58 kg/m^{2})
- Power/mass: 0.0699 hp/lb (0.1149 kW/kg)
