= Fokker XB-8 =

Dutch bomber prototype for the United States Army Air Corps

XB-8
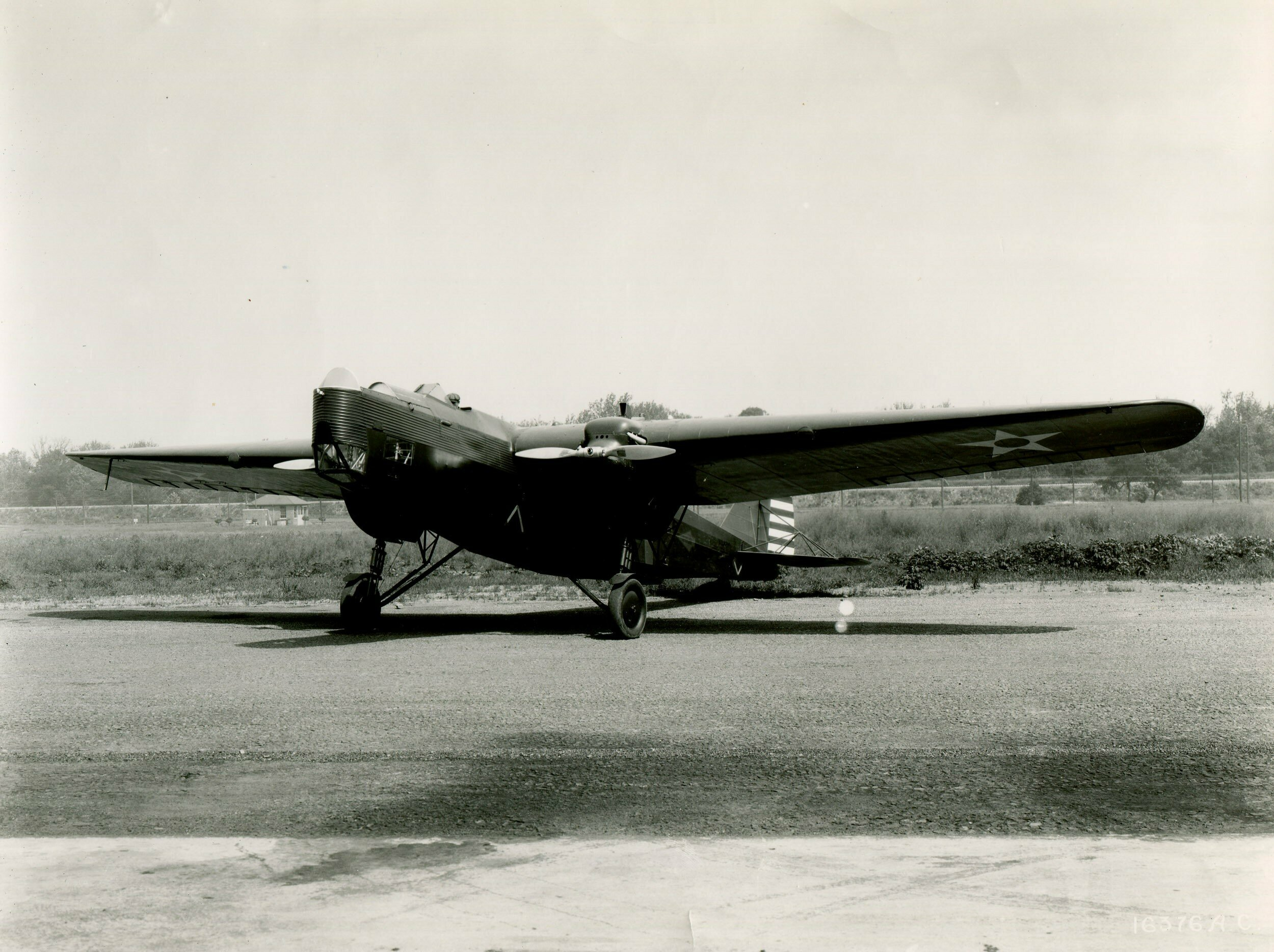
- XB-8 prototype

General information
- Type: Bomber
- Manufacturer: General Aviation Corporation.
- Designer: Fokker
- Primary user: United States Army Air Corps
- Number built: 7 (1 XB-8 + 2 YB-8 + 4 Y1B-8), all as Y1O-27

History
- First flight: 20 October 1930 as XO-27, February 1931 as XB-8

The Fokker XB-8 was a bomber built for the United States Army Air Corps in the 1930s, derived from the high-speed Fokker O-27 observation aircraft.

== Design and development ==
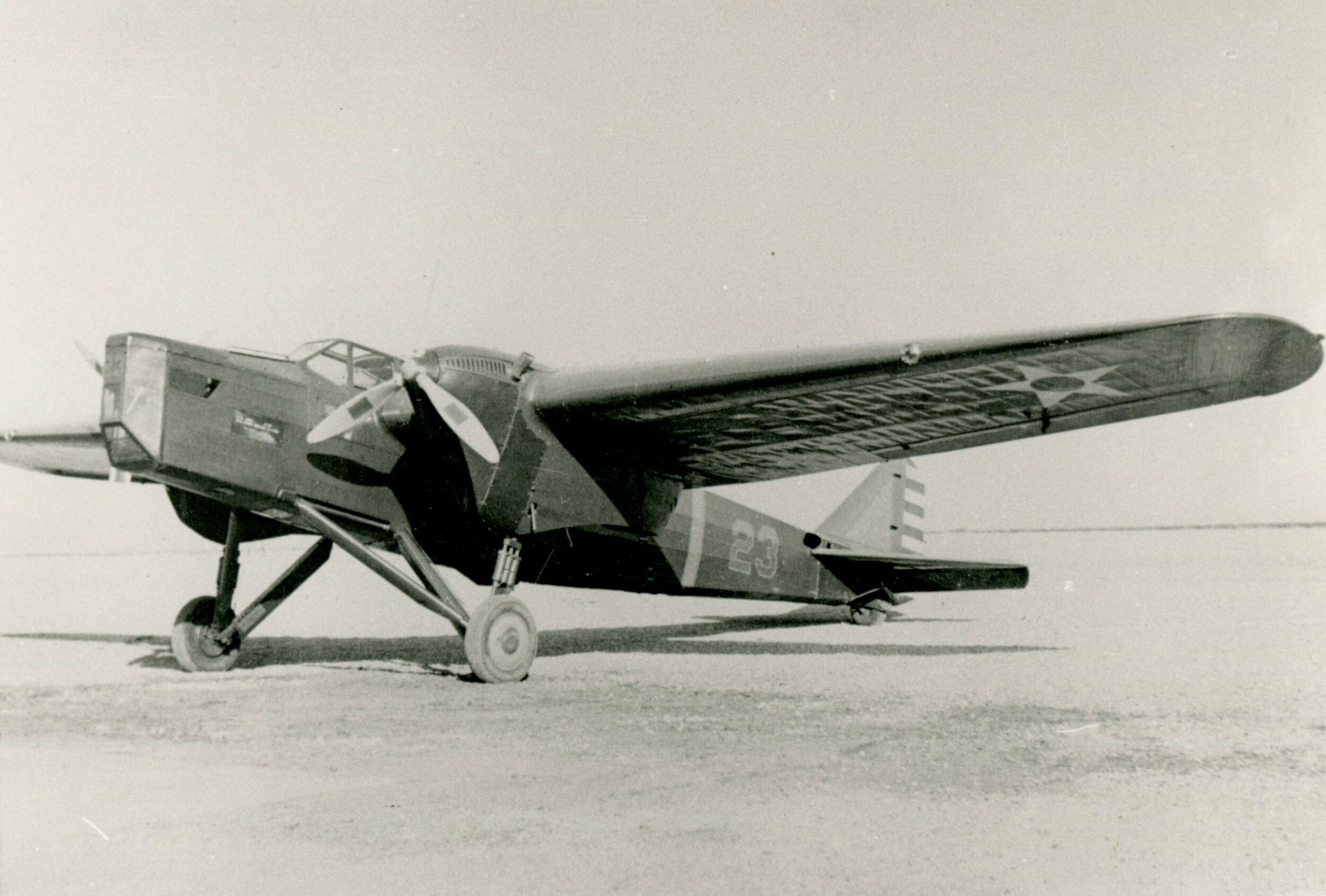
Fokker O-27

During assembly, the second prototype XO-27 was converted to a bomber prototype, dubbed the XB-8. While the XB-8 was much faster than existing biplane bombers, it did not have the bomb capacity to be considered for production. Two YB-8s and 4 Y1B-8s were ordered, but these were changed mid-production to Y1O-27 configuration.

The wing of the XB-8 and XO-27 was built entirely from wood, although the fuselage was constructed of steel tubes covered with fabric with the exception of the nose which had a corrugated metal. They featured the first retractable landing gear ever fitted to an Army Air Corps bomber or observation craft. The undercarriage retracted electrically. The crew was three in tandem position.

== Operational history ==
It competed against the Douglas Y1B-7/XO-36. Both promised to greatly exceed the performance of the large biplane bombers then used by the Army Air Corps. However, the Douglas XB-7 was markedly better in performance than the XB-8, and no further versions of Fokker's aircraft were built.

== Operators ==
United States

- United States Army Air Corps

== Specifications (XB-8) ==
Data from Fokker's Twilight.

General characteristics

- Crew: 4
- Length: 47 ft 4 in (14.42 m)
- Wingspan: 64 ft 4 in (19.60 m)
- Height: 11 ft 6 in (3.50 m)
- Wing area: 619 sq ft (57.5 m^{2})
- Empty weight: 6,861 lb (3,112 kg)
- Gross weight: 10,650 lb (4,824 kg)
- Powerplant: 2 × Curtiss V-1570-23 "Conqueror" V12 engines, 600 hp (450 kW) each

Performance

- Maximum speed: 160 mph (260 km/h, 140 kn)

== See also ==
Aircraft of comparable role, configuration, and era

- Douglas Y1B-7

Related lists

- List of bomber aircraft
- List of military aircraft of the United States
