= Bellanca TES =

TES/Blue Streak
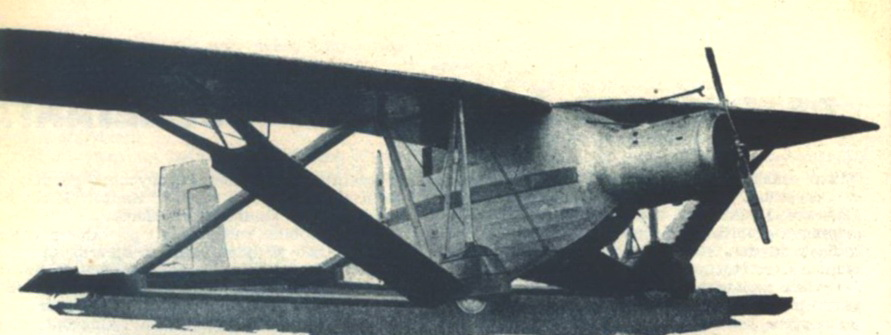

General information
- Type: Distance record aircraft
- Manufacturer: Bellanca Aircraft Corporation
- Designer: Giuseppe Mario Bellanca
- Status: crashed
- Number built: 1

History
- First flight: 1929
- Retired: 1931

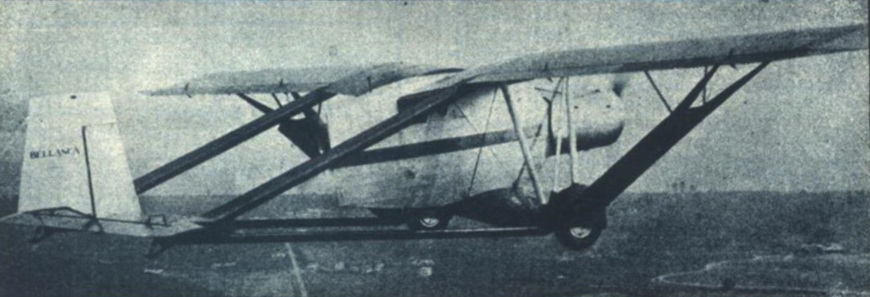
Rear view of the ill-fated TES

The Bellanca TES (Tandem Experimental Sesquiplane) or Blue Streak was a push-pull sesquiplane aircraft designed by Giuseppe Mario Bellanca in 1929 for the first non-stop flight from Seattle to Tokyo.

In 1930 it was refitted with two 600 hp Curtiss Conqueror engines and reinforced for the Chicago Daily News as a cargo plane named The Blue Streak. The aircraft crashed on 26 May, 1931 when the rear propeller driveshaft broke due to vibration and all four on board lost their lives.

== Specifications (with Pratt & Whitney Wasp engines) ==
Data from Aerofiles : Bellanca, Letec : Bellanca TES

General characteristics

- Crew: 2
- Capacity: 2 pax or relief crew
- Length: 44 ft 2 in (13.46 m)
- Wingspan: 83 ft 2 in (25.35 m)
- Wing area: 910 sq ft (85 m^{2})
- Empty weight: 6,990 lb (3,171 kg)
- Max takeoff weight: 20,935 lb (9,496 kg)
- Fuel capacity: 2,200 US gal (1,832 imp gal; 8,328 L)
- Powerplant: 2 × Pratt & Whitney R-1340 Wasp 9-cylinder air-cooled radial piston engines, 425 hp (317 kW) each :::::2x 600 hp (450 kW) Curtiss V-1570 Conqueror later
- Propellers: 3-bladed metal propellers

Performance

- Maximum speed: 149 mph (240 km/h, 129 kn)
- Range: 3,100 mi (5,000 km, 2,700 nmi) to 9,300 mi (15,000 km)
