= Lockheed YP-24 =

American two-seat fighter prototype

YP-24 Y1A-9
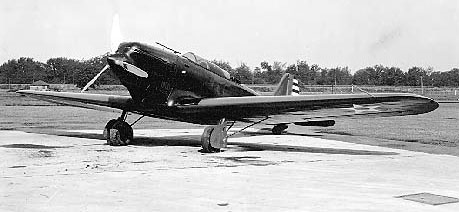

General information
- Type: Fighter; Ground attack
- Manufacturer: Detroit Lockheed
- Designer: Robert J. Woods
- Status: Prototype
- Primary user: United States Army Air Corps
- Number built: 1

History
- First flight: 1931
- Variant: Consolidated P-30

The Lockheed-Detroit YP-24 was a 1930s prototype two-seat fighter aircraft produced by Detroit Lockheed. An attack version called the A-9 was also proposed. The YP-24 is most notable for being the first fighter aircraft to bear the Lockheed name.

== Design and development ==
In 1930, Detroit Aircraft Corporation undertook a private venture to develop a new fighter ("pursuit aircraft" in contemporary terminology) for US Army Air Corps based on the successful Lockheed Altair transport plane. Designed by Robert J. Woods, the aircraft was completed in 1931 with Detroit Aircraft fabricating the metal fuselage and Lockheed providing the wooden wings, essentially identical to the Altair. Wright Field assigned the prototype the designation XP-900. Vance Breese was hired to be the chief test pilot for the project. The aircraft was purchased by USAAC in September 1931 and redesignated YP-24, serial number 32-320. Early testing was sufficiently impressive to generate an order for five Y1P-24 fighters and four Y1A-9 attack aircraft intended to replace the Berliner-Joyce P-16. The A-9 differed in having four forward-firing machine guns, underwing racks for bombs, and a V-1570-27 engine better low-altitude performance.

== Operational history ==
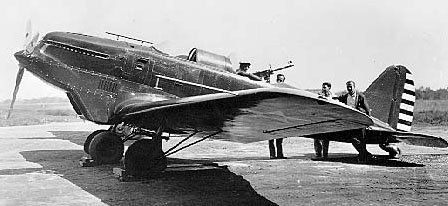
Detroit-Lockheed YP-24

On 19 October 1931, the sole aircraft crashed. The aircraft had a partially stuck landing gear, and Wright Field pilots painted messages on the side of their P-12D and O-25C aircraft, indicating to test pilot Lt. Harrison Crocker to bail out.

Shortly after, in October 1931, events in the Great Depression forced Detroit Aircraft into bankruptcy with Lockheed following suit in June 1932. Although Lockheed was resuscitated by a group of investors only five days after it closed doors, the financial hardships had taken their toll and the P-24/A-9 project was cancelled with no aircraft built beyond the original prototype. Four pre-production Y1P-24s, 32-321/324, were cancelled. However, after Robert Woods left Detroit Aircraft for Consolidated Aircraft, he continued to develop the YP-24/A-9 concept into the Consolidated Y1P-25/Y1A-11 which eventually entered service as the Consolidated P-30.

== Specifications (YP-24) ==
Data from Lockheed Aircraft since 1913

General characteristics

- Crew: 2
- Length: 28 ft 9 in (8.76 m)
- Wingspan: 42 ft 9 1/2 in (13.043 m)
- Height: 8 ft 6 in (2.59 m)
- Wing area: 292 sq ft (27.1 m^{2})
- Empty weight: 3,010 lb (1,365 kg)
- Gross weight: 4,360 lb (1,978 kg)
- Powerplant: 1 × Curtiss V-1570-23 Conqueror V-12 liquid-cooled piston engine, 600 hp (450 kW)
- Propellers: 3-bladed fixed-pitch propeller

Performance

- Maximum speed: 235 mph (378 km/h, 204 kn)
- Cruise speed: 215 mph (346 km/h, 187 kn)
- Range: 556 mi (895 km, 483 nmi)
- Service ceiling: 25,000 ft (7,600 m)
- Rate of climb: 1,820 ft/min (9.2 m/s)

Armament

- Guns:

- 1 × 0.50 in (12.7 mm) machine gun fixed forward-firing through the propeller disc
- 1 × 0.30 in (7.62 mm) machine gun fixed forward-firing through the propeller disc
- 1 × 0.30 in (7.62 mm) machine gun in rear cockpit

== See also ==
Related development

- Consolidated P-30
- Lockheed Altair

Related lists

- List of fighter aircraft
- List of Lockheed aircraft
- List of military aircraft of the United States
