= Curtiss XO-30 =

XO-30

General information
- Type: Observation monoplane
- National origin: United States
- Manufacturer: Curtiss
- Status: Cancelled
- Primary user: United States Army Air Service

The Curtiss XO-30 was a projected 1920s American twin-engined observation monoplane designed by the Curtiss Aeroplane and Motor Company for the United States Army Air Service, a prototype was cancelled and not built.

== Design and development ==
One prototype observation monoplane was ordered by the United States Army Air Service and designated XO-30 with the serial number 29-451. The XO-30 was to have had two 600 hp (447 kW) V-1570-9 engines and a crew of three. The program was cancelled and the prototype was not built.
