= Curtiss XP-10 =

Prototype biplane fighter

XP-10
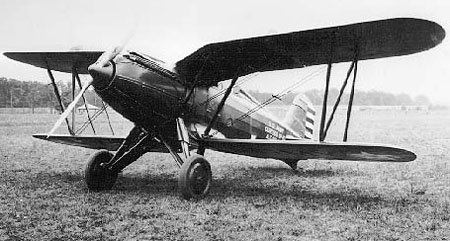
- The sole Curtiss XP-10 (s/n 28-387)

General information
- Type: Biplane fighter
- Manufacturer: Curtiss Aeroplane and Motor Company
- Status: Cancelled
- Primary user: United States Army Air Corps
- Number built: One

History
- Retired: 1928

The Curtiss XP-10 was an American experimental biplane fighter developed by Curtiss and tested by the United States Army Air Corps, but rejected after failing to meet performance expectations and having major problems in the cooling system.

== Design and development ==
Ordered on 18 June 1928, it was intended to be fast and maneuverable enough to win a dogfight. The XP-10 used a gull wing top wing, joined at the fuselage; this offered much better pilot visibility than the traditional biplane configuration. This also permitted the wing and fuselage to meet at the optimum angle for minimizing drag. The wings were plywood-covered (rather than doped fabric, as used in World War I), and the fuselage was fabric-covered steel tubing.

The XP-10 used a 600 hp (447 kW) Curtiss V-1570-15 Conqueror water-cooled V12 engine. To overcome the drag of a radiator (a quite serious issue before the introduction of ethylene glycol), Curtiss incorporated it into the upper wing. It was formed of corrugated brass sheets through which cooling water was run. While ingenious, this introduced technical and mechanical problems, especially vulnerability to enemy fire in a combat aircraft.

== Operational history ==
Delivered to the Army Air Corps in August 1928, the XP-10 first flew in September. Despite good maneuverability, with the XP-10 proving slightly faster than the Curtiss P-6 Hawk in testing but inferior in climb rate, persistent problems with cooling and the plumbing of the surface radiator led to the project being abandoned.

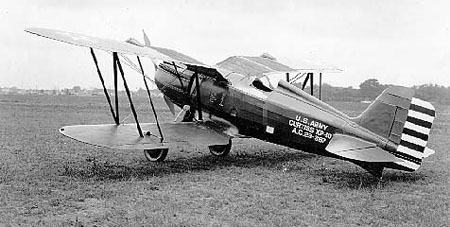
The XP-10 seen from behind

== Operators ==
United States

- United States Army Air Corps

== Specifications (XP-10) ==
Data from Curtiss Aircraft 1907–1947, U.S.Fighters

General characteristics

- Crew: 1
- Length: 23 ft 3 in (7.09 m)
- Wingspan: 33 ft (10 m)
- Height: 8 ft 8 in (2.64 m)
- Wing area: 270 sq ft (25 m^{2})
- Empty weight: 3,040 lb (1,379 kg)
- Gross weight: 3,975 lb (1,803 kg)
- Powerplant: 1 × Curtiss V-1570-15 Conqueror V-12 water-cooled piston engine, 600 hp (450 kW)
- Propellers: 2-bladed fixed-pitch propeller

Performance

- Maximum speed: 191 mph (307 km/h, 166 kn) at sea level

215 mph (187 kn; 346 km/h)

- Range: 461 mi (742 km, 401 nmi)
- Service ceiling: 26,500 ft (8,100 m)
- Rate of climb: 1,940 ft/min (9.9 m/s)

Armament

- Guns: none installed (one 0.300 in (7.62 mm) and one 0.500 in (12.70 mm) machine guns planned
