= Douglas Y1B-7 =

American bomber/observation aircraft

Y1B-7
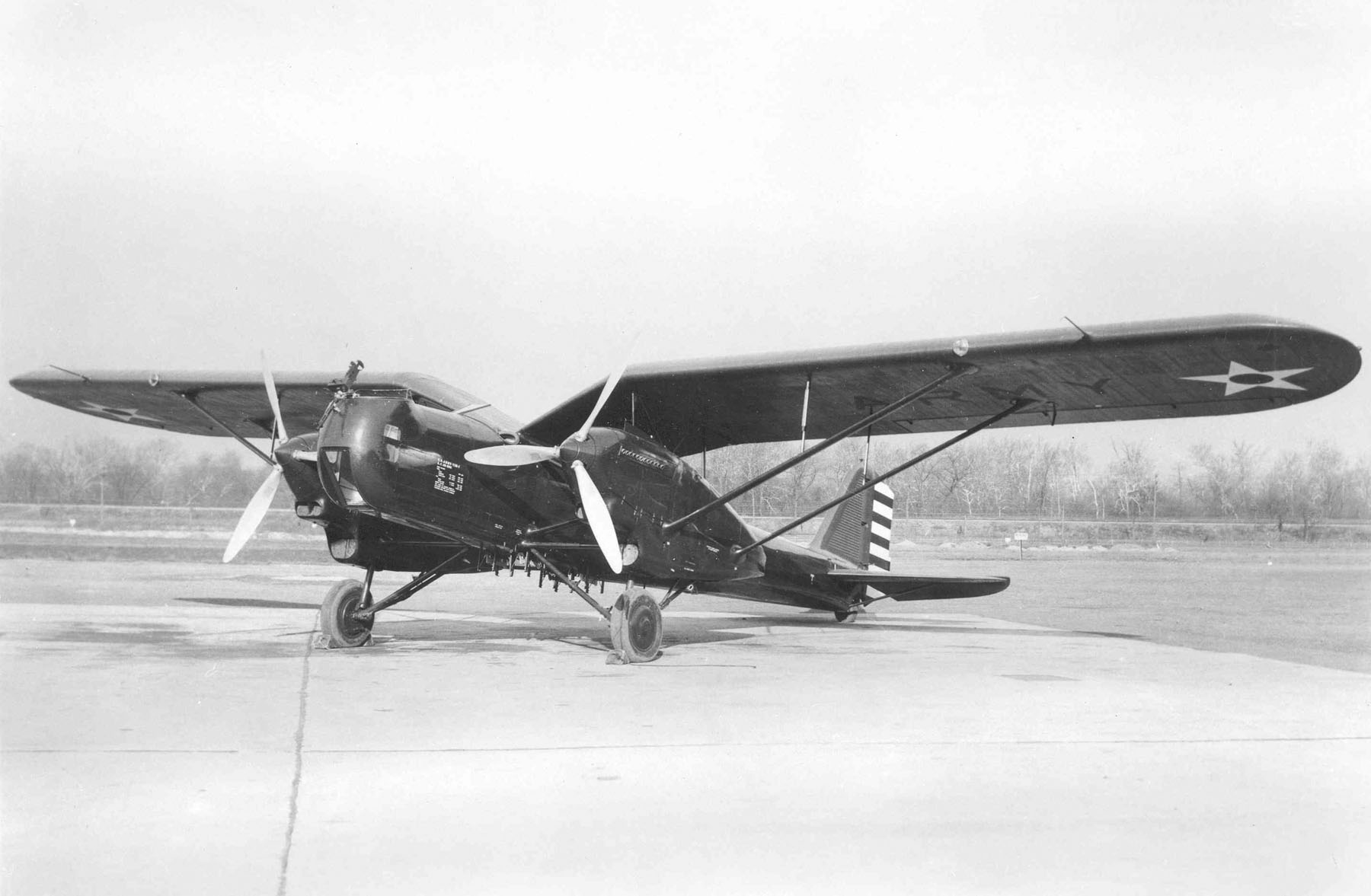
- Y1B-7 of the 31st Bombardment Squadron

General information
- Type: Bomber/Observation aircraft
- Manufacturer: Douglas Aircraft Company
- Primary user: United States Army Air Corps
- Number built: 14

History
- Manufactured: 1932
- First flight: 1931
- Retired: January 1939

The Douglas Y1B-7 was a 1930s American bomber aircraft. It was the first US monoplane given the B- 'bomber' designation. The monoplane was more practical and less expensive than the biplane, and the United States Army Air Corps chose to experiment with monoplanes for this reason. At the time the XB-7 was ordered, it was being tested by Douglas Aircraft as an observational plane.

== Design and development ==
In 1929–1930, the Douglas Aircraft Company designed a new twin-engined monoplane observation aircraft to compete with the Fokker XO-27, two prototypes of which had been ordered by the United States Army Air Corps in July 1929, as Douglas feared that the advanced Fokker would challenge Douglas's role as the major supplier of observation aircraft to the Air Corps. The Douglas proposals resulted in the Air Corps placing an order for two prototypes, the XO-35 and XO-36, on 26 March 1930. The two aircraft were to differ only in the engines fitted, with the XO-35 having geared Curtiss V-1570-29 Conqueror engines, while the XO-36 used direct-drive V-1570-23, which both produced 600 hp (450 kW) each.

The Douglas design had gull wings mounted high on the aircraft's fuselage, the engines being suspended in streamlined nacelles under the wings by bracing struts. A retractable tailwheel undercarriage was fitted, the mainwheels retracting into the engine nacelles. The fuselage was a semi-monocoque structure with corrugated duralumin covering, which housed the aircraft's crew of four: a nose gunner/observer, a pilot whose cockpit was situated ahead of the leading edge of the wing, an upper gunner who sat in a cockpit aft of the wing, and a radio operator housed within the fuselage. Armament was two .30 in machine guns.

The projected performance of the new twin-engined Douglas and Fokker observation aircraft was much greater than the Keystone biplanes (the Keystone B-3, B-4, B-5 and B-6) that equipped the Air Corps light bomber squadrons, and both Fokker and Douglas were instructed to complete one of their prototypes as a bomber, with the XO-36 being redesignated the XB-7, with provision to carry up to 1,200 lb (540 kg) of bombs on racks under the fuselage added.

The XO-36 made its first flight at the Santa Monica, California factory of Douglas in spring 1931. On 22 August 1931, the Air Corps placed an order for a small batch of service test aircraft, consisting of seven Y1B-7 bombers and five Y1O-35 observation aircraft. These differed from the prototypes by having smooth fuselage skins rather than the corrugated skins used on the prototype, while the fuselage was 11 in (280 mm) longer to adjust the aircraft's center of gravity. A revised fuel system was fitted, with more fuel carried in order to give the two-hour endurance specified by the Air Corps. More powerful Conqueror engines were fitted, with all aircraft using geared engines as used on the XO-35.

== Operational history ==
The XO-35 was delivered to the Air Corps at its test center at Wright Field, Ohio on 24 October 1931, with the XB-7 following in July 1932. The twelve service test aircraft were completed between November 1932 and March 1933. The Y1B-7s equipped the 11th and 31st Bombardment Squadrons at March Field, California, while the Y1O-35s were issued to a number of Squadrons, including the 88th Observation Squadron at Brooks Field, Texas. One notable early use of the Y1B-7 was during a May 1933 exercise at Fort Knox, where it was able to outrun biplane fighters like the Boeing P-12, showing that the Air Corps needed more modern fighters.

Despite the aircraft's superior performance to the elderly Keystone biplanes, the Douglas monoplane never entered mass production either in the observation or bomber roles because newer, more capable aircraft, such as the Martin B-10, were under development while a change in Air Corps policy meant that it was no longer interested in buying more twin-engined observation aircraft.

In February 1934, US President Franklin D. Roosevelt cancelled all air mail contracts owing to a scandal relating to the award of contracts, thus initiating the Airmail Emergency, where the Air Corps was tasked with carrying the mail until new contracts could be awarded. The O-35s and B-7s were considered some of the most suitable aircraft in the Air Corps inventory for the air mail role, so the six remaining Y1B-7s and the five Y1O-35s, together with the XO-35, were assigned to air mail routes in the western United States, which included hazardous operations over the Rocky Mountains, the Cascade Range and the Sierra Nevada. By the time the Air Corps involvement in air mail flights ended in June 1934, the twelve O-35s and B-7s had flown 1,412 hours on mail flights, while four of the B-7s had been lost as a result of accidents. The last O-35s and B-7s were withdrawn from use in December 1938.

== Variants ==
XO-35
Prototype twin-engined observation aircraft. Two 600 hp (450 kW) geared Curtiss V-1570-29 engines driving three-bladed propellers. One built.
XO-36
Prototype twin-engined observation aircraft. Two 600 hp (450 kW) direct-drive Curtiss V-1570-23 engines driving two-bladed propellers. Redesignated XB-7. One built.
XB-7
Prototype light bomber, with two direct-drive 600 hp (450 kW) V-1570-23 engines driving two bladed propellers. One built.
Y1O-35
Service test batch of observation aircraft, powered by 650 hp (480 kW) V-1570-39 or 675 hp (503 kW) V-1570-53 engines. Five built.
Y1B-7
Service test batch of bombers, powered by 640 hp (480 kW) V-1570-33 or 675 hp (503 kW) V-1570-53 engines. Seven built.

== Operators ==
United States

- United States Army Air Corps

== Specifications (Y1B-7) ==
Data from McDonnell Douglas aircraft since 1920 : Volume I

General characteristics

- Length: 45 ft 11 in (14.00 m)
- Wingspan: 65 ft (20 m)
- Height: 11 ft 7 in (3.53 m)
- Wing area: 621.2 sq ft (57.71 m^{2})
- Empty weight: 5,519 lb (2,503 kg)
- Gross weight: 9,953 lb (4,515 kg)
- Max takeoff weight: 11,177 lb (5,070 kg)
- Powerplant: 2 × Curtiss V-1570-53 Conqueror V-12 liquid-cooled piston engines, 675 hp (503 kW) each
- Propellers: 3-bladed metal propellers

Performance

- Maximum speed: 182 mph (293 km/h, 158 kn)
- Cruise speed: 158 mph (254 km/h, 137 kn)
- Range: 411 mi (661 km, 357 nmi)
- Ferry range: 632 mi (1,017 km, 549 nmi)
- Service ceiling: 20,400 ft (6,200 m)
- Time to altitude: 10,000 ft (3,000 m) in 8 minutes 42 seconds
- Wing loading: 16 lb/sq ft (78 kg/m^{2})
- Power/mass: 0.135 hp/lb (0.222 kW/kg)

Armament

- Guns: 2 × 0.30 in (7.6 mm) machine guns
- Bombs: 1,200 lb (540 kg) of bombs carried beneath the fuselage

== See also ==
Aircraft of comparable role, configuration, and era

- Fokker XB-8

Related lists

- List of bomber aircraft
- List of military aircraft of the United States
