= Detroit Aircraft Corporation =

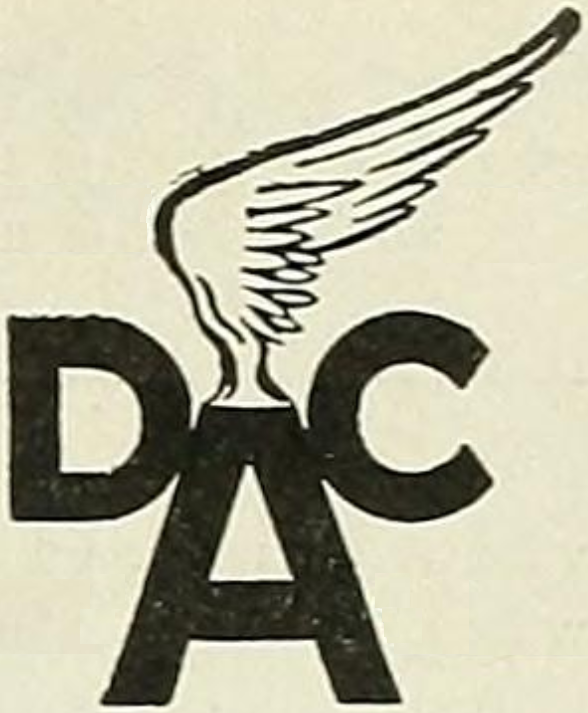

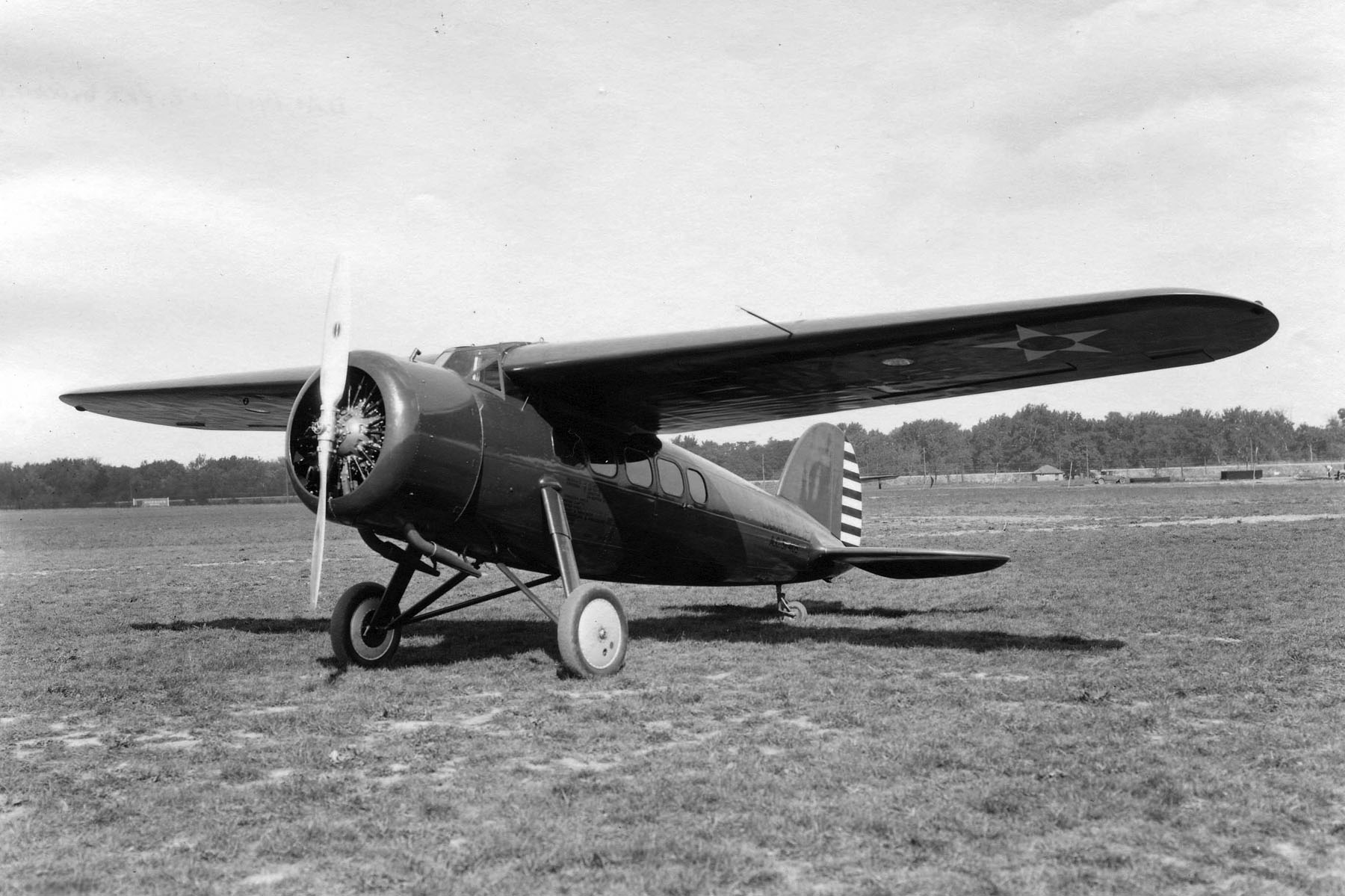
- Detroit Y1C-12 used for testing by the United States Army Air Corps
- Industry: Aerospace
- Founded: 1922; 104 years ago
- Defunct: 1931; 95 years ago
- Fate: Split
- Successor: Lockheed Aircraft Company; Metalclad Airship Corporation
- Headquarters: Detroit, Michigan, United States of America

The Detroit Aircraft Corporation was incorporated in Detroit, Michigan on July 10, 1922, as the Aircraft Development Corporation. The name was changed in 1929.

The Detroit corporation owned the entire capital stock of the Ryan Aircraft Corp., Aircraft Development Corp., Aviation Tool Co., Grosse Ile Airport, Inc., Marine Aircraft Corp., Park's Air College and Affiliated Companies, Detroit Aircraft Export Co., Gliders, Inc., and Eastman Aircraft Corp. It also owned a 90% interest in the Blackburn Aeroplane and Motor Company, practically all of the capital stock of the Lockheed Aircraft Company and a 40% interest in Winton Aviation Engine Co. During the Great Depression the Detroit Aircraft holding company found that rising losses from other operations were draining the company coffers. On October 27, 1931, the Detroit Aircraft Corporation went into receivership. The heavier than air portions of the company were amalgamated under Lockheed, while the lighter than air divisions were formed into a new unit called the Metalclad Airship Corporation.

This company is not related to the Detroit Aircraft Company, incorporated in 2011, and developing the Vertical Takeoff electric vehicle called the MOBi. The operator will be Airspacex.

== Officers ==
- Chairman: M. Bjelivuk, Edward S. Evans
- President: C. B. Fritsche
- Vice-Pres.: E. T. Gushee
- Treasurer: C. A. Parcells
- Directors: M. Bjelivuk, F. W. Blair, William Benson Mayo, E. T. Gushee, C. A. Parcells, C. W. Harrah, E. W. Lewis, C. S. Mott, Ransom Eli Olds, Ralph Hazlett Upson, R. D. Chapin, P. Ball, H. H. Knight, H. M. Bixby, T. N. Dysart, J. S. Elliott, F. E. Keeler, and B. S. Hunter

== Subsidiaries ==
Ryan Aircraft Corporation: Incorporated into Detroit Aircraft on July 5, 1929, Ryan Aircraft acquired the assets and business of the Mahoney-Ryan Aircraft Corporation, the successor to Ryan Air Lines. Ryan Aircraft manufactured four and six-place cabin monoplanes at their St. Louis facility, adjacent to the municipal airport. The Detroit Aircraft Corporation owned Ryan Aircraft's entire capital stock.

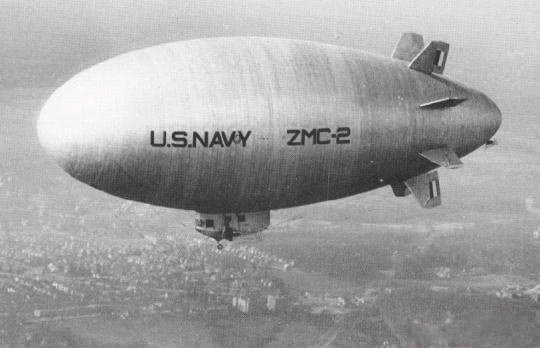
The Aircraft Development Corporation ZMC-2

Aircraft Development Corporation: was incorporated on July 12, 1929 in Michigan to take over and continue development and construction of "metal-clad" airships for commercial, military and naval uses. Company held patents covering design and construction of "Metalclad" rigid airships and airship mooring towers. The first "Metalclad" airship, the ZMC-2, was constructed for the U.S. Navy in 1929. Detroit Aircraft Corp. owned entire capital stock. Edsel Ford, William May and William Stout, invested in the venture in an effort to make Detroit the manufacturing center of the dirigible industry. The Ford name was not closely associated with the ZMC-2 at the insistence of Henry and Edsel Ford, but Ford laboratories, on the property of the newly completed Ford Airport conducted tests on the ZMC-2 and paid $500,000 for the 225-foot (69 m) dirigible mooring at Ford's airport

Aviation Tool, Co. Incorporated in Michigan, June 11, 1929, to take over and continue the development of automatic riveting machines and their application to all types of aircraft. Detroit Aircraft Corp. owned entire capital stock.

Grosse Ile Airport, Inc. Incorporated in Michigan, Nov. 15, 1926. Owned and operated an airport on Grosse Ile, an island in the Detroit River. The airport covered 403 acres (1.63 km^{2}) of land and has water approaches on three sides. Contains a circular landing field. 3,000 feet (910 m) in diameter, and an airship hangar. Detroit Aircraft Corp. owned entire capital stock.

Marine Aircraft Corp. Incorporated in Michigan, June 11, 1929, to specialise exclusively in all-metal amphibian and flying boat construction for commercial and naval uses. Manufactured an all-metal six-place cabin amphibian plane. Detroit Aircraft Corp. owned entire capital stock.

Eastman Aircraft Corp. Incorporated in Michigan. Nov. 26, 1928. Manufactured the Sea Rover and Sea Pirate flying boat ranging In price from $7,500 to $10,000. Detroit Aircraft Corp. owned entire capital stock.

Blackburn Aircraft Corp. Incorporated in Michigan, May 20, 1929. to acquire design and patent rights on entire line of metal aircraft of Blackburn Airplane & Motor Co., Ltd. of England. DAC controlled 90% with the UK company holding 10% of the stock.

Detroit Aircraft Export Co. Incorporated in December 1928 for the purpose of handling export sales in South and Central China. Japan, Australia, New Zealand and South Africa. Detroit Aircraft Corp. owned entire capital stock.

Gliders, Inc. Engaged exclusively in the manufacture of sailplanes. Factory located In Detroit, Detroit Aircraft Corp. owned entire capital stock.

The Lockheed Aircraft Company of Santa Barbara, California had been a going concern all throughout the 1920s. However, in 1929, the management of Lockheed voted to sell majority share ownership to the Detroit Aircraft Corporation. In July 1929, the Detroit Aircraft Corporation acquired 87 percent of the assets of Lockheed Aircraft Company.

Park's Air College and Affiliated Companies, Inc., see Parks College of Engineering, Aviation and Technology.

== Aircraft ==
Model name	First flight	Number built	Type
Detroit DAC-2C			Glider
Detroit G-1 Gull		3+	Glider
Detroit E-2 Sea Rover			Single engine flying boat
Detroit ZMC-2 (Zeppelin Metal Clad-2)	1929	1	Metal clad rigid airship (ZMC)
Detroit DL-1 Vega	1930	11	Single engine cabin monoplane
Detroit DL-2 Sirius		1	Single engine monoplane
Detroit DL-2A Altair		2	Single engine monoplane
Detroit YP-24	1931	1	Prototype single engine fighter
Detroit TE-1	N/A	0	Unbuilt single engine biplane torpedo bomber
Detroit Y1P-24	N/A	0	Unbuilt single engine fighter
Detroit Y1A-9	N/A	0	Unbuilt single engine attack aircraft

== Bibliography ==
- Morrow, Walker C.; Carl B. Fritsche (1967). The Metalclad Airship ZMC-2. Grosse Ile: W.C. Morrow.
- "Detroiters Form Giant Aircraft Consolidation". Air Travel News. Detroit, Michigan: Air Travel News Corporation. July 1929. pp. 21–23, 65.
