= Curtiss V-1570 Conqueror =

American piston aircraft engine

V-1570
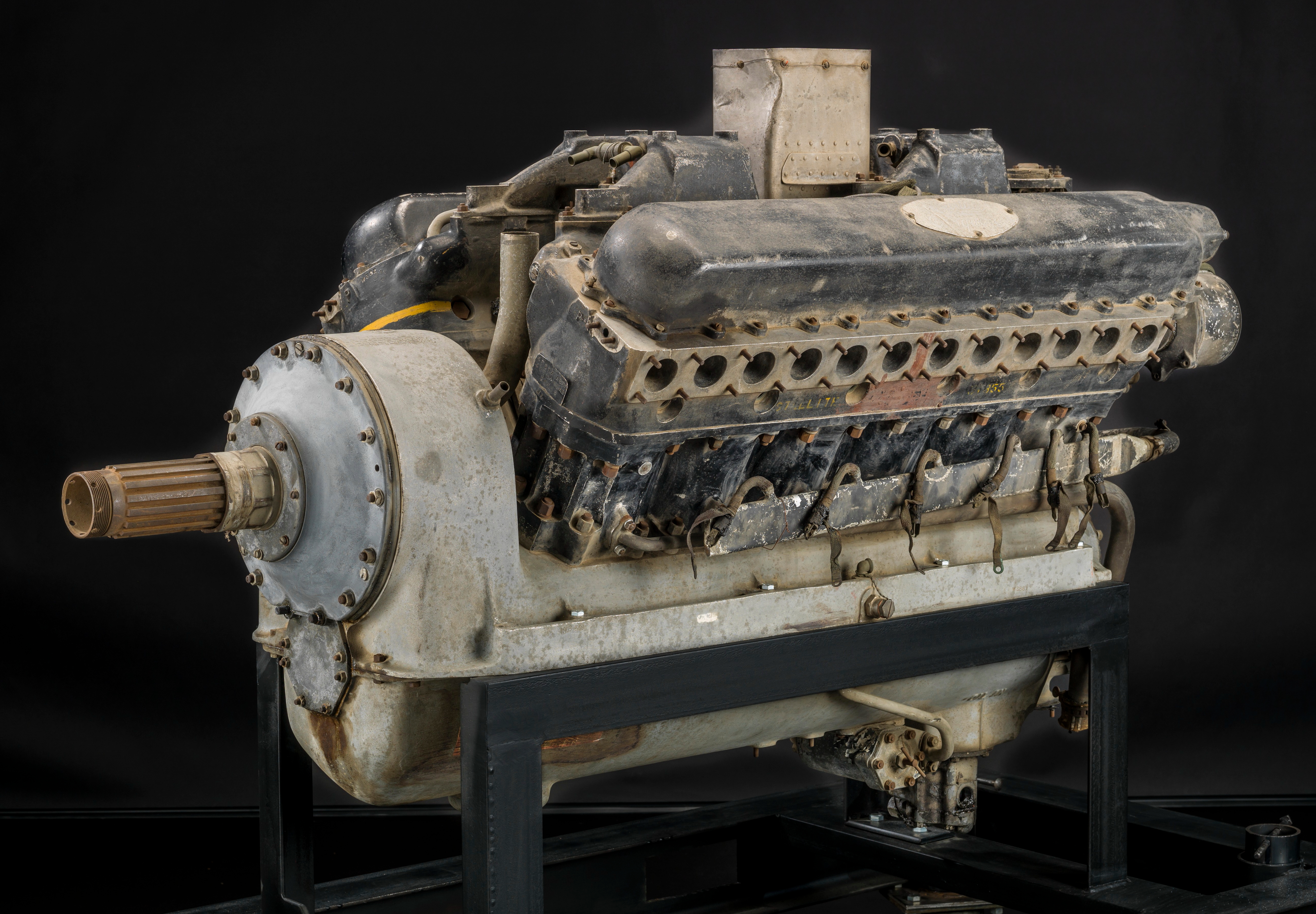
- A V-1570-53 at the National Air and Space Museum.
- Type: V12 piston engine
- National origin: United States
- Manufacturer: Curtiss Aeroplane and Motor Company
- First run: 1926
- Number built: 681
- Developed from: Curtiss D-12

The Curtiss V-1570 Conqueror was a V12 liquid-cooled aircraft engine. Representing a more powerful version of the Curtiss D-12, the engine entered production in 1926 and flew in numerous aircraft.

== Design and development ==
Designed in 1924 as a military successor to the Curtiss D-12, initially named the Conqueror, it was later given the military designation of V-1570 based on its displacement of 1,570 cubic inches (26 L). The engine featured open-ended cylinder liners (advanced technology for the period) and pressurized liquid cooling. Developments including the use of a supercharger gradually increased power output until reliability problems due to overheating and coolant leaks became apparent. Military funding for further development of the Conqueror was cut in 1932, efforts by Curtiss to market the engine for civil airliners failed and the line was dropped from production.

== Variants ==
V-1570-1
V-1570-5
V-1570-7
GV-1570-7
geared -7
V-1570-9
V-1570-11
V-1570-13
V-1570-15
SV-1570-15
V-1570-17
V-1570-23
V-1570-25
V-1570-27
V-1570-29
V-1570-33
V-1570-53
V-1570-55
V-1570-57
V-1570-59
V-1570-61
V-1570-79
GIV-1570-FM
V-1570-C
V-1570-F
GIV-1570C

== Applications ==
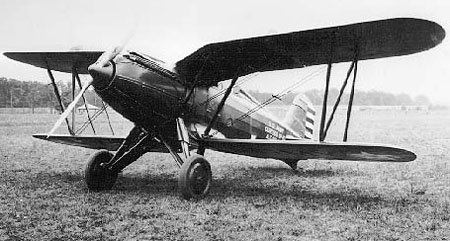
Curtiss XP-10

- Atlantic XB-8
- Bellanca TES (1930 version)
- Berliner-Joyce P-16
- Boeing XP-9
- Boeing Y1B-9
- Consolidated A-11
- Consolidated P-30
- Consolidated Y1P-25
- Curtiss A-8
- Curtiss B-2 Condor
- Curtiss CO Condor
- Curtiss P-1 Hawk
- Curtiss P-6 Hawk
- Curtiss XO-30 (not built)
- Curtiss XP-10
- Dornier Do X
- Douglas O-31
- Douglas O-43
- Douglas Y1B-7
- Huff-Daland XB-1
- Lockheed YP-24
- Thomas-Morse YO-23
- Tupolev TB-3

=== Other applications ===
- Mormon Meteor III (custom Bonneville salt flat race car)
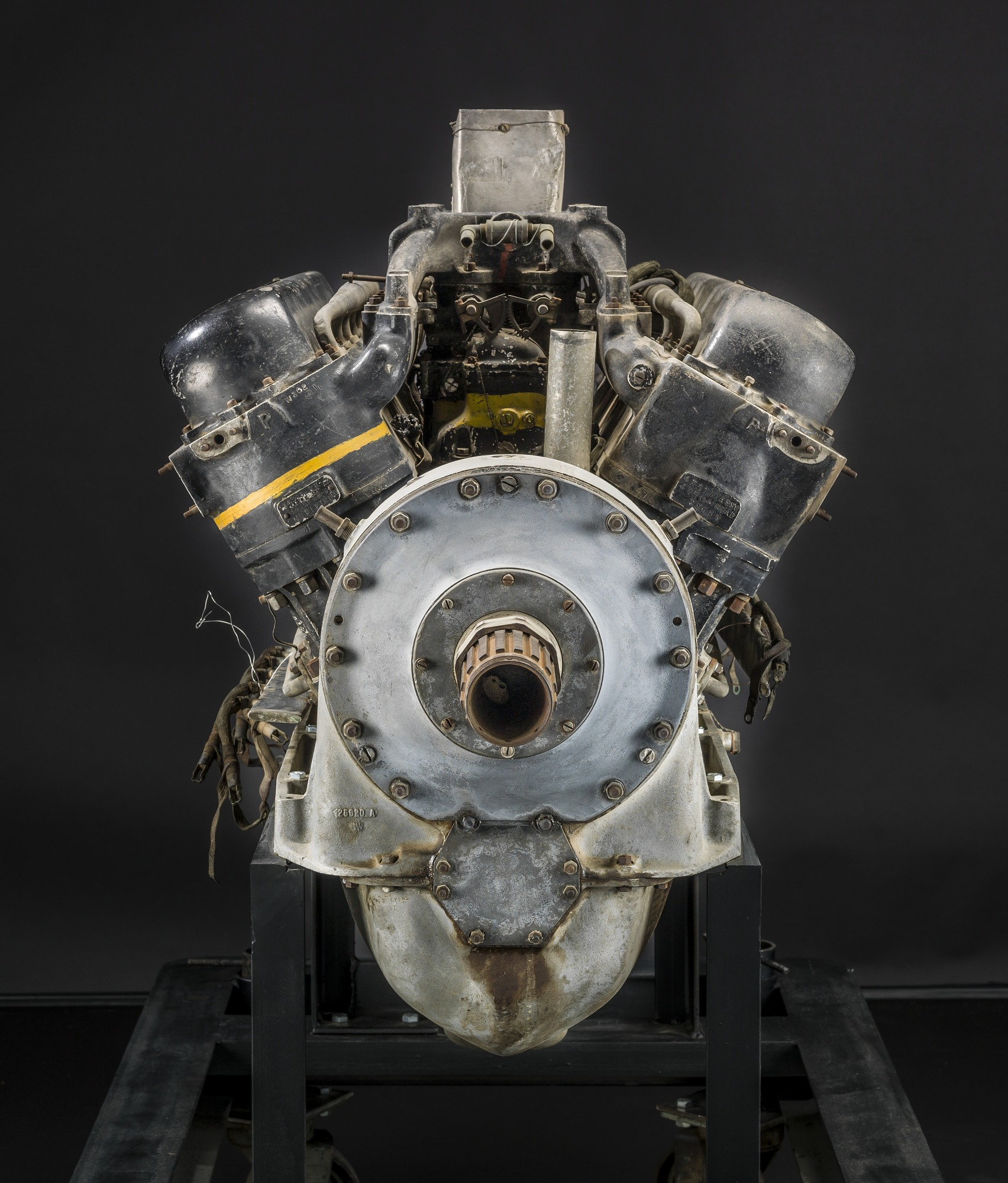

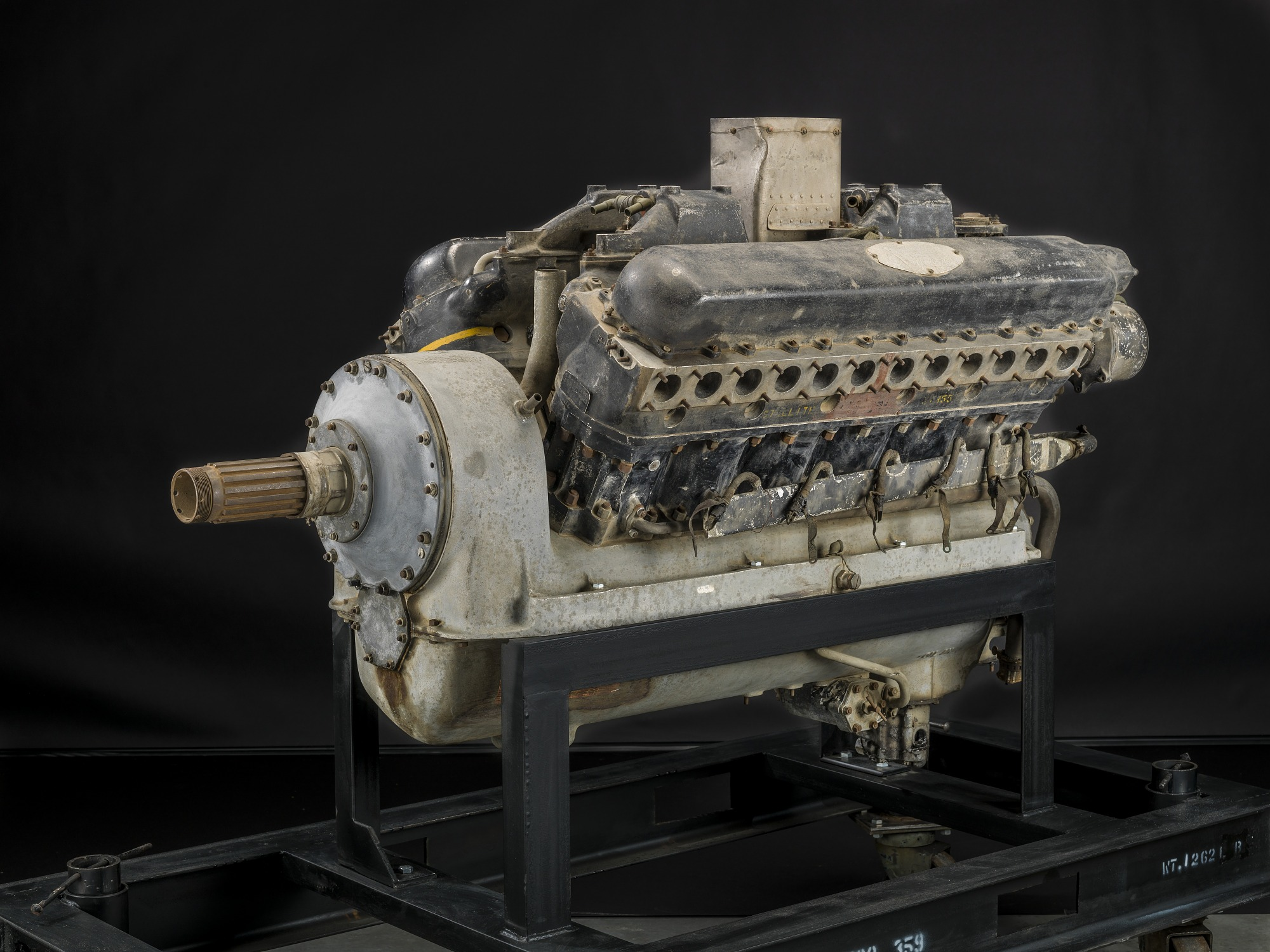

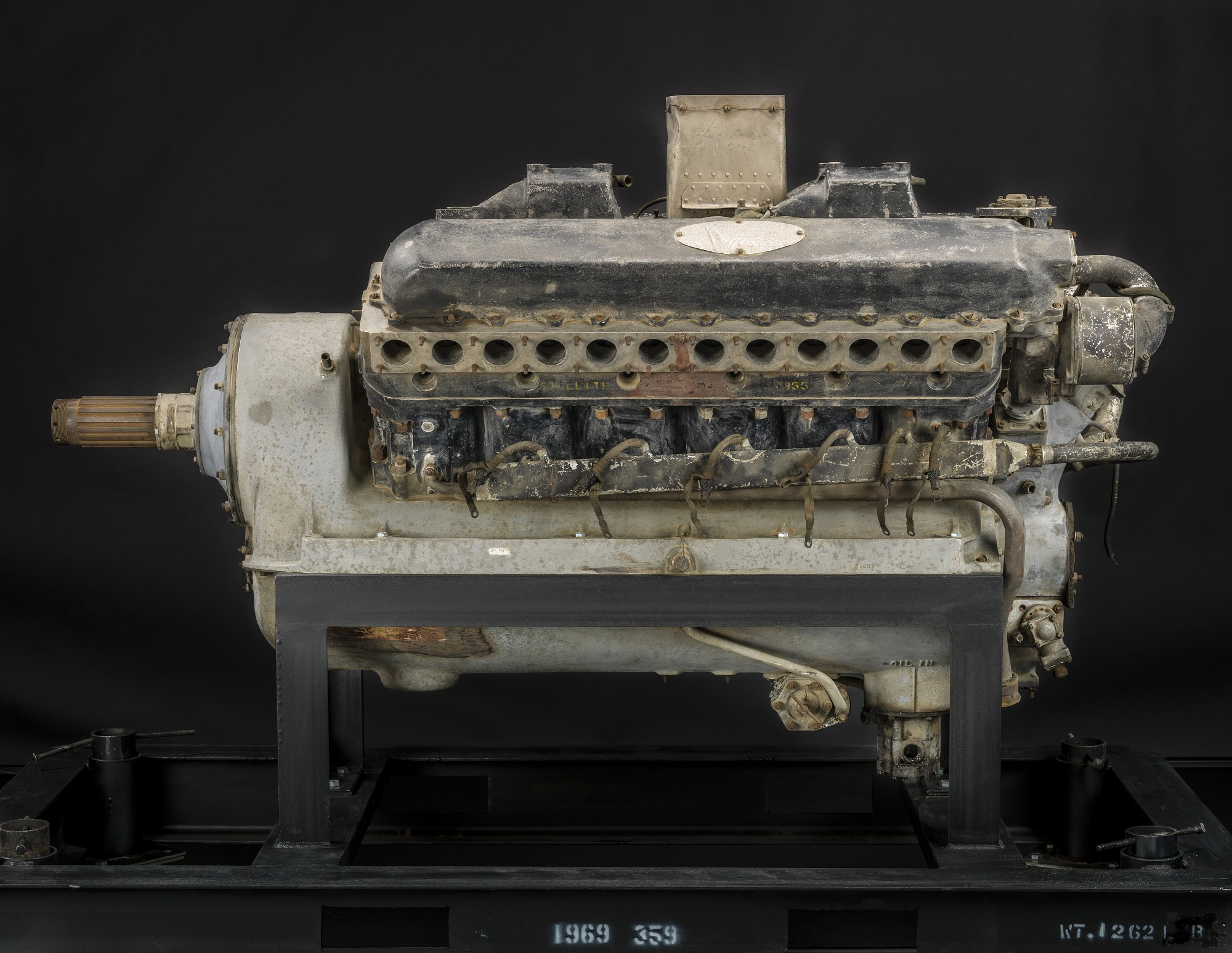

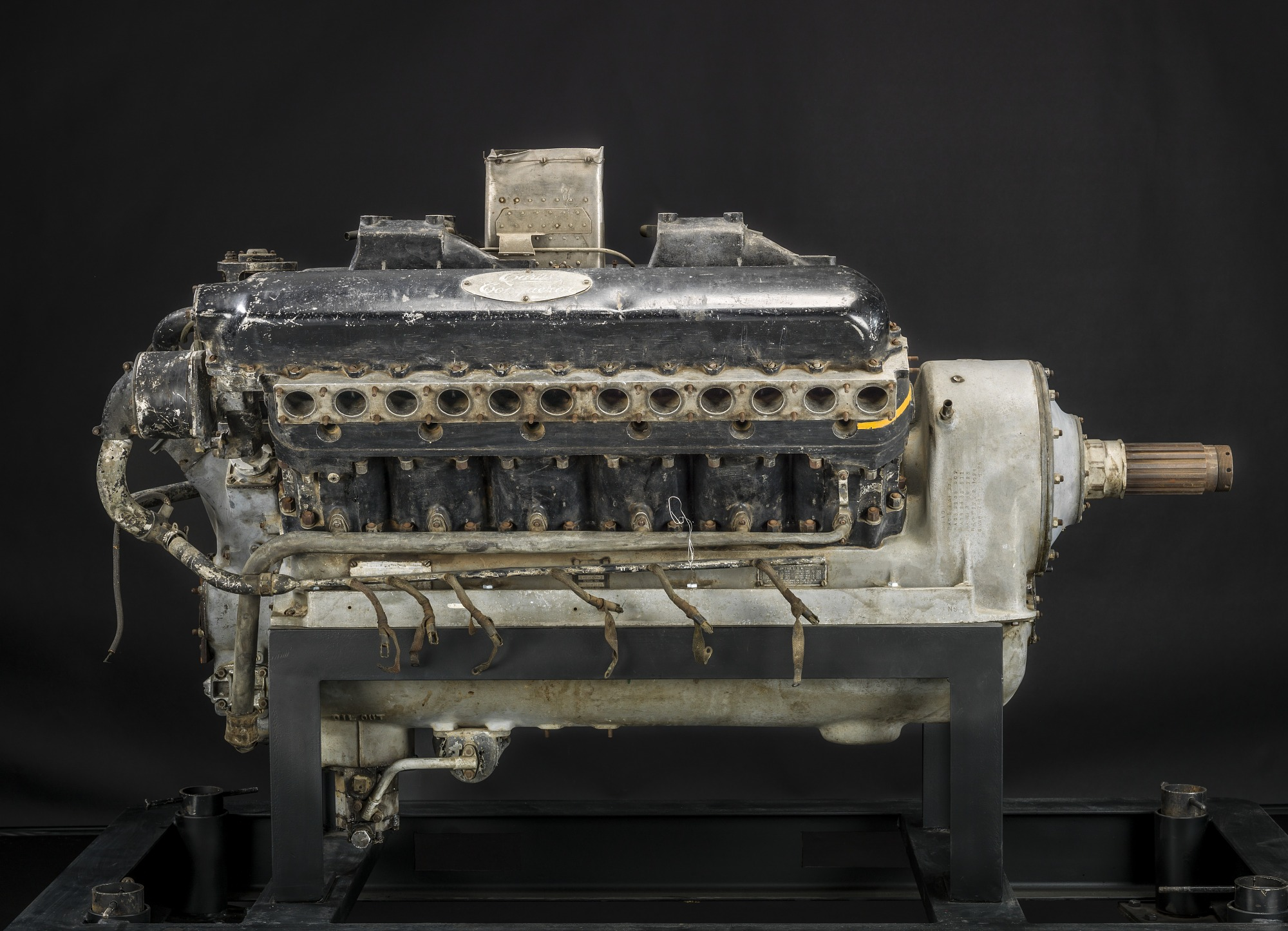

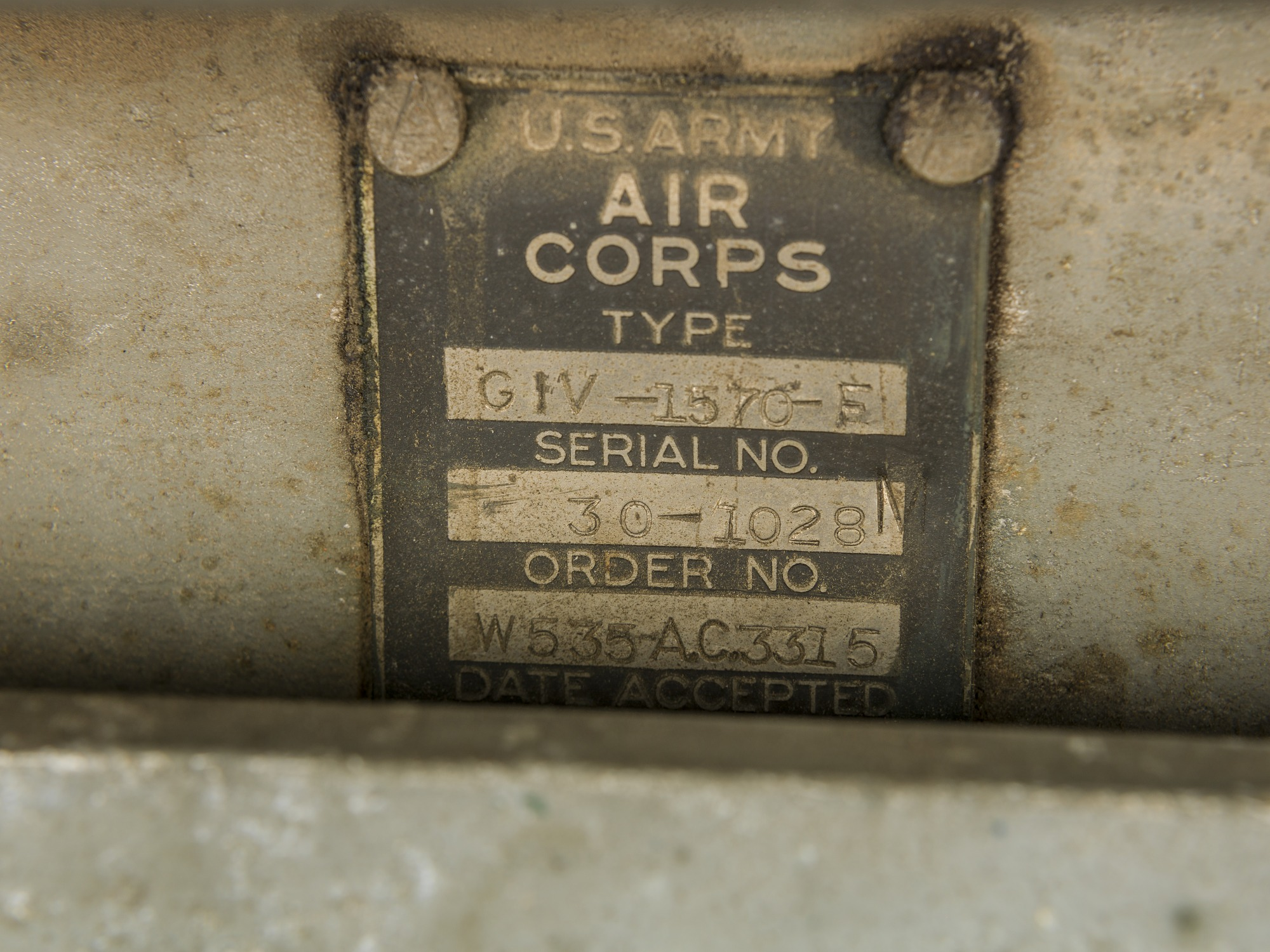

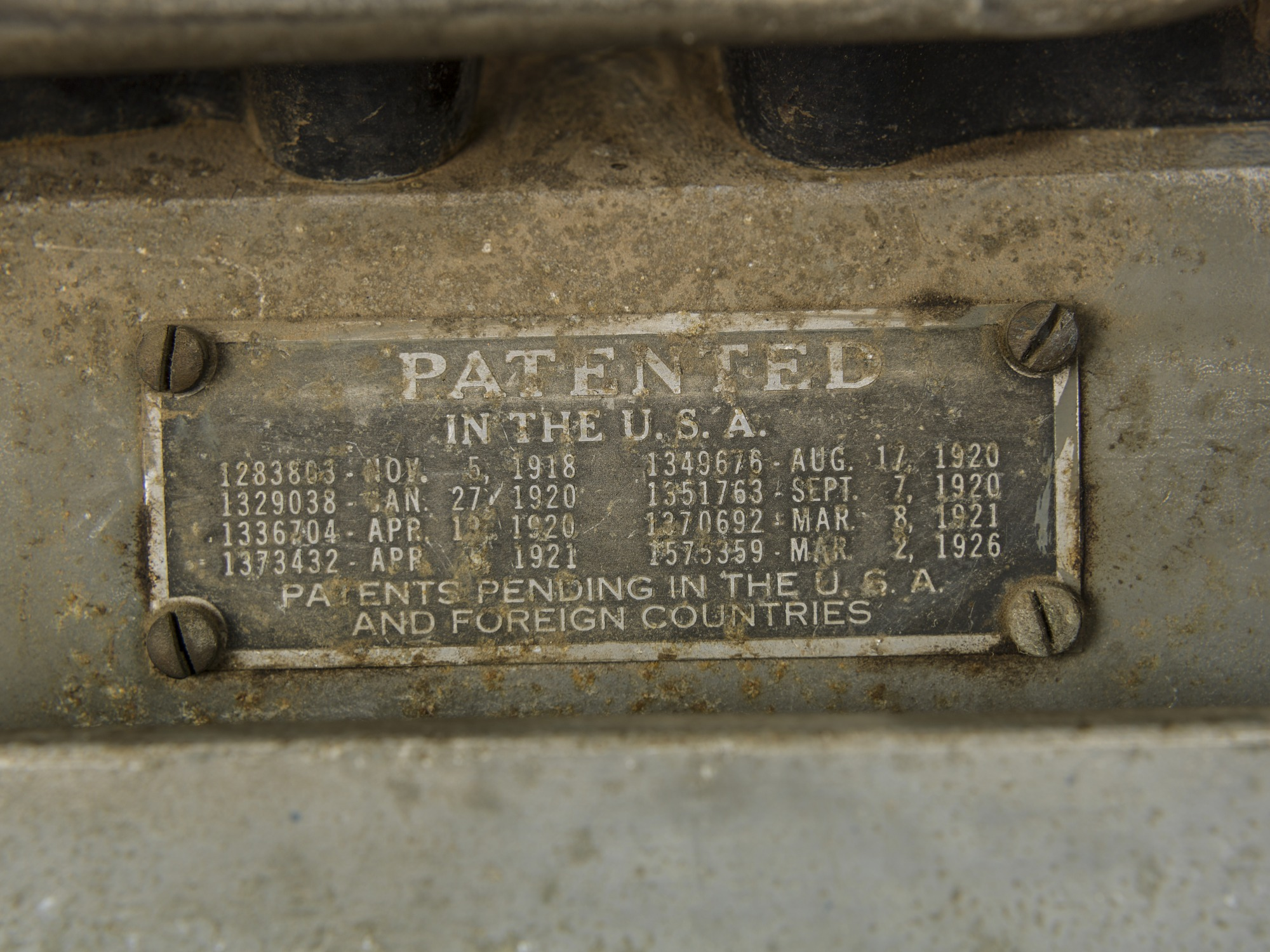

== Specifications (V-1570 direct drive) ==
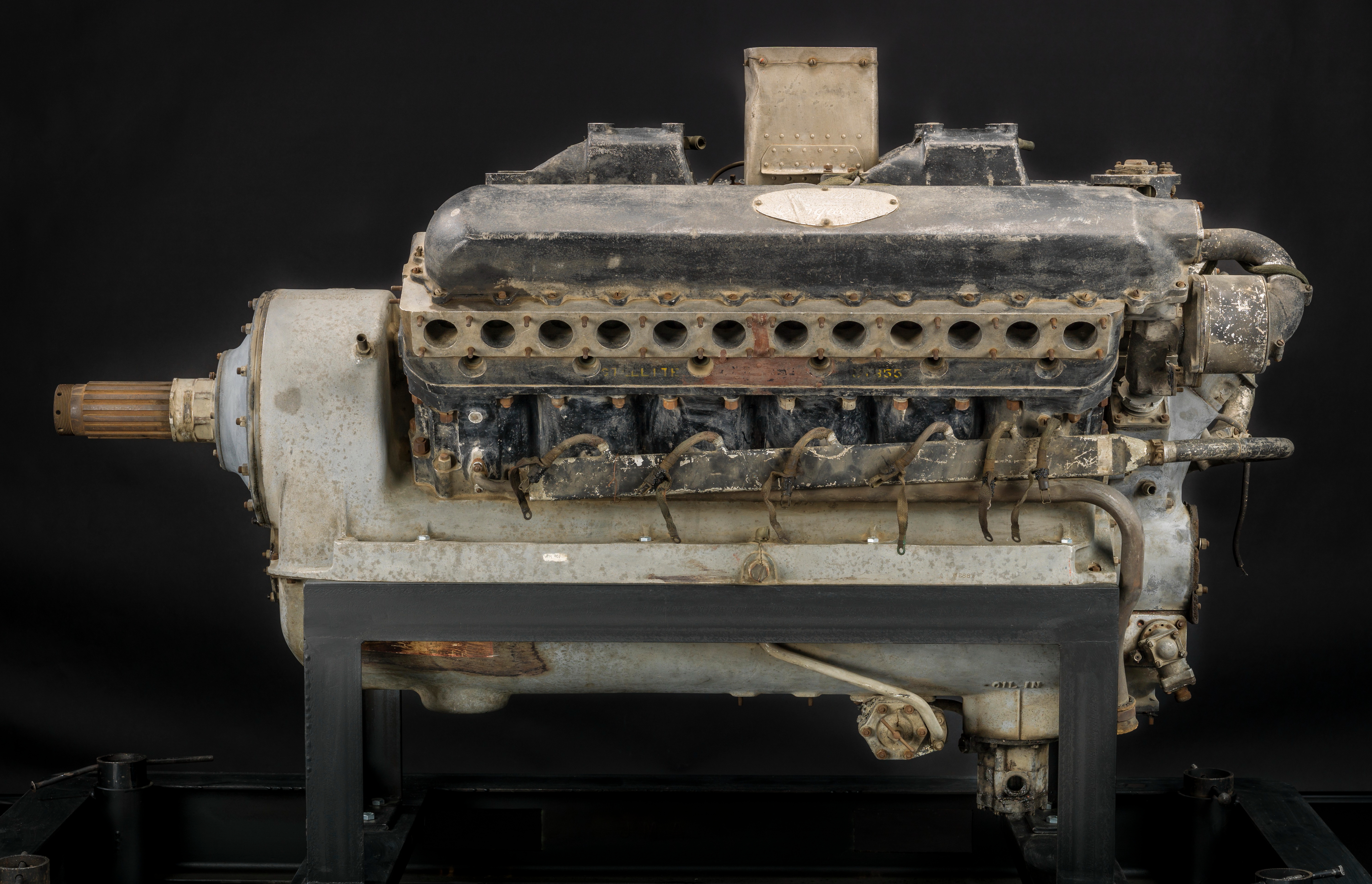
Side view of V-1570-53

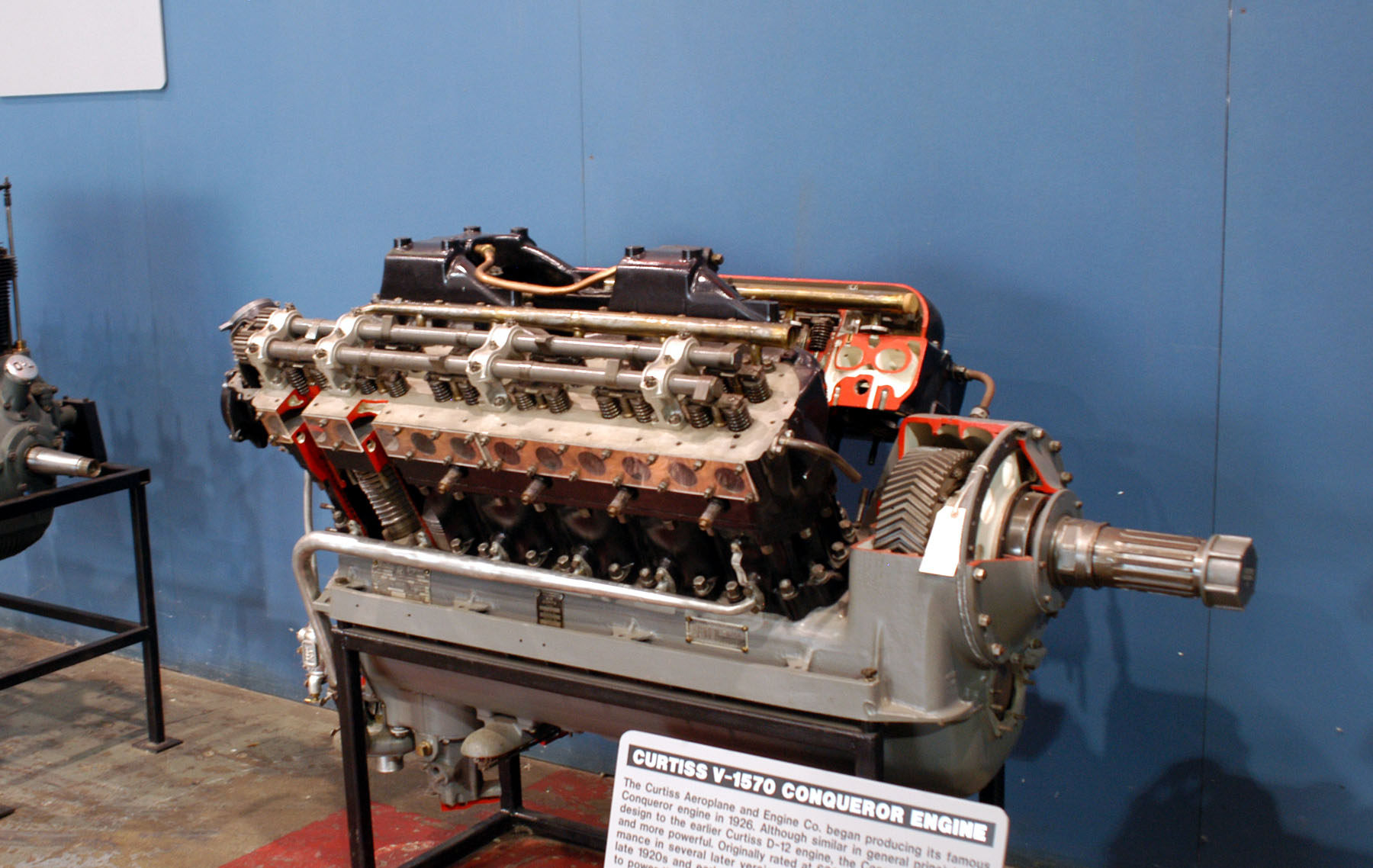

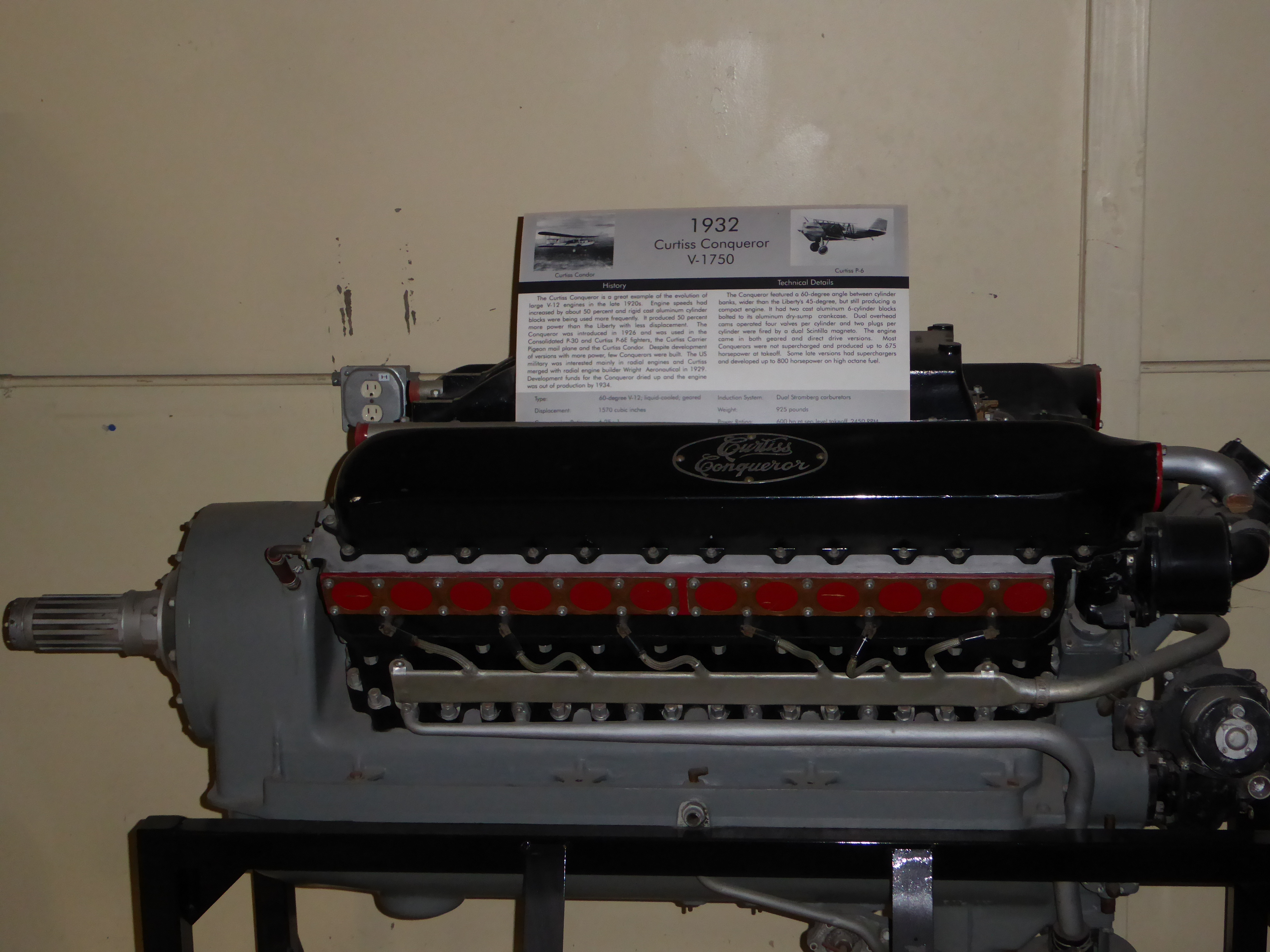

Data from Grey and Gunston.

=== General characteristics ===
- Type: V-12 liquid-cooled aircraft piston engine
- Bore: 5 1/8 in (130 mm)
- Stroke: 6 11/32 in (161 mm)
- Displacement: 1,570.4 cu in (25.7 L)
- Length: 64 in (1,600 mm)
- Width: 26 5/16 in (668 mm)
- Height: 39 1/16 in (992 mm)
- Dry weight: 835 lb (379 kg)

=== Components ===
- Valvetrain: Inlet and exhaust overhead camshafts operating two exhaust and two inlet valves per cylinder, via 'T' head cam followers.
- Fuel system: Two Stromberg NA-Y6-O carburetors
- Oil system: Dry sump, pressure feed and spray with scavenge.
- Cooling system: Liquid-cooled (water or chemical coolant)
- Reduction gear: Direct-drive
- Ignition system: One Scintilla magneto and two distributors

=== Performance ===
- Power output: 600 hp (450 kW) at 2,400 rpm (direct-drive)
- Specific power: 0.43 hp/in³ (19.6 kW/L)
- Compression ratio: 6.1:1
- Specific fuel consumption: 0.53 lb/(hp⋅h) (0.32 kg/kWh)
- Oil consumption: 0.02 lb/(hp⋅h) (0.012 kg/kWh)

== See also ==
Related development

- Curtiss D-12

Comparable engines

- Allison V-1710
- Hispano-Suiza 12Y
- Klimov M-105

Related lists

- List of aircraft engines
