= Curtiss Shrike =

Curtiss Shrike may refer to any of the following aircraft

- Curtiss A-8, a low-wing monoplane ground-attack aircraft, first flight June 1931
  - Curtiss YA-10 Shrike, a test and development version of the A-8 with a radial engine, first flight 1932
  - Curtiss A-12 Shrike, a variant of the A-8 and YA-10 with a radial engine, introduced 1933
- Curtiss XA-14, a twin engine ground-attack aircraft prototype, first flight September 1935
  - Curtiss A-18 Shrike, the operational version of the XA-14 with more powerful engines
- Curtiss SB2C Helldiver, known as the Curtiss A-25 Shrike; a dive bomber first flown in December 1940
