= Strike =

Strike may refer to:

== People ==
- Strike (surname)
- Hobart Huson, author of several drug related books

== Physical confrontation or removal ==
- Strike (attack), attack with an inanimate object or a part of the human body intended to cause harm
- Airstrike, military strike by air forces on either a suspected or a confirmed enemy ground position
- Bird strike, collision between an airborne animal and a man-made vehicle, especially aircraft
- Bridge strike, collision of an over-height vehicle to a bridge.
- Military strike, limited attack on a specified target
- Striking the colors, to haul down a flag to indicate surrender
- Strikethrough, typographical presentation of words with a horizontal line through the center of them
- Utility strike, during an excavation accidentally hitting or damaging buried pipes or wires belonging to a public utility or other such services
- YouTube copyright strike, a copyright policing practice used by YouTube

== Refusal to work or perform ==
- Capital strike, refusal to invest in an economy
- Hunger strike, participants fast as an act of political protest, or to provoke feelings of guilt in others
- Rent strike, when a group of tenants en masse agrees to refuse to pay rent until a specific list of demands is met by the landlord
- Sex strike, refusal to engage in sexual activity to challenge a societal dispute
- Strike action, a work stoppage caused by the mass refusal of employees to perform work
- Student strike, occurs when students enrolled at a teaching institution such as a school, college or university refuse to go to class

== Science and technology ==
- Strike (unit), an obsolete unit of volume, typically equivalent to two bushels
- Electric strike, access control device used for doors
- Lightning strike, electrical discharges caused by lightning
- Strike and dip, measure of the orientation of a geologic feature
- "Striking", cutting parts of a plant for propagation
- Striking clock, clock that sounds the hours on a bell or gong

== Sport ==
- Strike (bowling), a term used in bowling
- Strike, a term used in association football (soccer) to mean an accurate, driven shot kicked using the laces of the boot
- "On strike", a term used to refer to the striker in cricket
- Strike zone, a term used in baseball
- Moraingy bare-fisted striking

== Arts, entertainment, and media ==
=== Films ===
- Strike (1912 film), a lost Australian film
- Strike (1925 film), a silent film made in the Soviet Union by Sergei Eisenstein
- Strike! (1998 film), a Canadian-American comedy film written and directed by Sarah Kernochan
- Strike (2006 film), a Polish-language film directed by Volker Schlöndorff
- Strike (2018 film), a stop-motion animated film directed by Trevor Hardy

=== Music ===
- Strike (band), British dance band formed in 1994
- Strike (percussion group), New Zealand group formed in 1993
- "Strike (Holster)" a 2023 song by American rapper Lil Yachty
- Strikes (album), third album by Southern rock band Blackfoot, released in 1979

=== Television ===
- Strike (TV series), a BBC series based on the Cormoran Strike detective book series
- "The Strike" (Seinfeld), 166th episode of the NBC sitcom; it aired in December 1997
- "The Strike", 1988 episode of The Comic Strip Presents
- The Strike, a 1989 episode of the American children's comedy science fiction sitcom Small Wonder
- "Strike!", a 2020 episode of the TV series Pocoyo

=== Video games ===
- Strike (video game series), video games released during 1991–1997 by Electronic Arts
- Strikes, cooperative multiplayer modes in the video game Destiny (video game), similar to a military strike

=== Other uses in arts, entertainment, and media ===
- Strike, the Japanese name for the Pokémon Scyther
- S.T.R.I.K.E., fictional counter-terrorism and intelligence agency in the Marvel Comics universe
- Strike Entertainment, film production company founded in 2002 by Marc Abraham and Thomas Bliss, associated with Universal Studios
- Kamen Rider Strike, a Kamen Rider Dragon Knight character

== Other uses ==
- <strike>, the HTML tag
- Strike price, fixed price at which the owner of an option can purchase, in the case of a call, or sell, in the case of a put, the underlying security or commodity

== See also ==
- The Strike (disambiguation)
- Gold Strike (disambiguation)
- Shrike (disambiguation)
- Strike Force (disambiguation)
- Striker (disambiguation)
