= Airstrike (disambiguation) =

An airstrike is a military strike by air forces or other military aviation assets against an enemy ground position.

Airstrike may also refer to:

- AeroWings 2: Airstrike, a combat flight simulator
- Airstrike (comics), a fictional character
- Air Strike (1955 film), a Korean War US aviation war film
- Air Strike (2018 film), a WWII US-Chinese aviation war film
- Airstrike (video game), 1982 video game

== See also ==
- Air (disambiguation)
- Strike (disambiguation)
