= Shrike (disambiguation) =

A shrike is a passerine bird of the family Laniidae.

Shrike may also refer to:

== Birds ==
Other passerine birds known as shrikes:

- Helmetshrike (Prionopidae), an African family closely related to the true shrikes
- Bushshrike (Malaconotidae), another African family, also formerly considered true shrikes
- Cuckooshrike (Campephagidae), a widespread Old-World family
- Shrikebill (Clytorhynchus), an Australasian genus of monarch-flycatcher
- Shriketit (Falcunculidae), birds in the genus Falcunculus
- Shrike-tyrant (Agriornis), a South American genus of tyrant-flycatchers
- Woodshrike (Vangidae), birds in the genus Tephrodornis
- Australian magpie (Gymnorhina tibicen), the true piping shrike
- Bornean bristlehead (Pityriasidae), also known as the bristled shrike or bald-headed wood-shrike
- Magpie-lark (Grallina cyanoleuca), an Australian tyrant-flycatcher mistaken for the piping shrike

== Military ==
- Curtiss Shrike (disambiguation), several American combat aircraft of the 1930s
- USS Shrike, two US Navy ships
- Bell X-9 Shrike, a prototype surface-to-air guided missile
- AGM-45 Shrike, an American anti-radiation missile designed to home in on hostile antiaircraft radars
- RNAS Maydown, also known as HMS Shrike, a former Royal Navy Naval Air Station
- Ares Shrike 5.56, a belt-fed machine gun conversion kit
- Focke-Wulf Fw 190 Würger (English: Shrike), a German World War II fighter aircraft
- The Mighty Shrikes, the nickname of United States Navy Strike Fighter Squadron 94

== Entertainment ==
=== In fiction ===
- Shrike (comics), the codename of a series of DC comics characters
- The Shrike, a monster in the Hyperion Cantos science fiction book series
- The Shrike, a character in the 1973 novel Christie Malry's Own Double-Entry by English writer B. S. Johnson
- The Shrike, an enemy in the video game Brute Force
- Shrike, a character in Nathanael West's novella Miss Lonelyhearts
- Shrike, a character in the computer game Red Faction II
- Shrike, a character in the 2018 film Mortal Engines
- Shrike, the nickname of the monster Renfri in the short story The Lesser Evil by Andrzej Sapkowski, from his The Witcher series
- Lionel Shrike, a character in the films Now You See Me and Now You See Me 2
- Shrike Sanchez, a main character in the animated web-series Monkey Wrench
- The Shrike, a species in the Marvel Television series Agents of S.H.I.E.L.D.
- The Shrykes, a sapient, birdlike species in the Edge Chronicles book series
- The Minnesota Shrike, the nickname of the fictional serial killer Garret Jacob Hobbs in the Hannibal (TV series)
- Blood Shrike, the title of the Emperor's second in command in Sabaa Tahir's An Ember in the Ashes novel series
- Shrikes, the second generation light attack craft in the Honor Harrington science fiction series by David Weber
- An animal in the 1979 book series The Animals of Farthing Wood by Colin Dann, and the subsequently televised British-French animated series by the same name
- A heavily armed enemy vessel in the 3rd season of the Paramount+ television series Star Trek: Picard.

=== Other entertainment ===
- The Shrike (play), a 1952 Pulitzer Prize–winning drama by Joseph Kramm
- The Shrike (film), a 1955 film based on the play
- "Shrike", a song by Irish musician Hozier from the 2019 album Wasteland, Baby!

== Other uses ==
- Shrike (racing car), an Australian open-wheel racing car
- Shrike Commander, an Aero Commander aircraft
