= 108th Air Refueling Squadron =

Illinois Air National Guard unit

108th Air Refueling Squadron

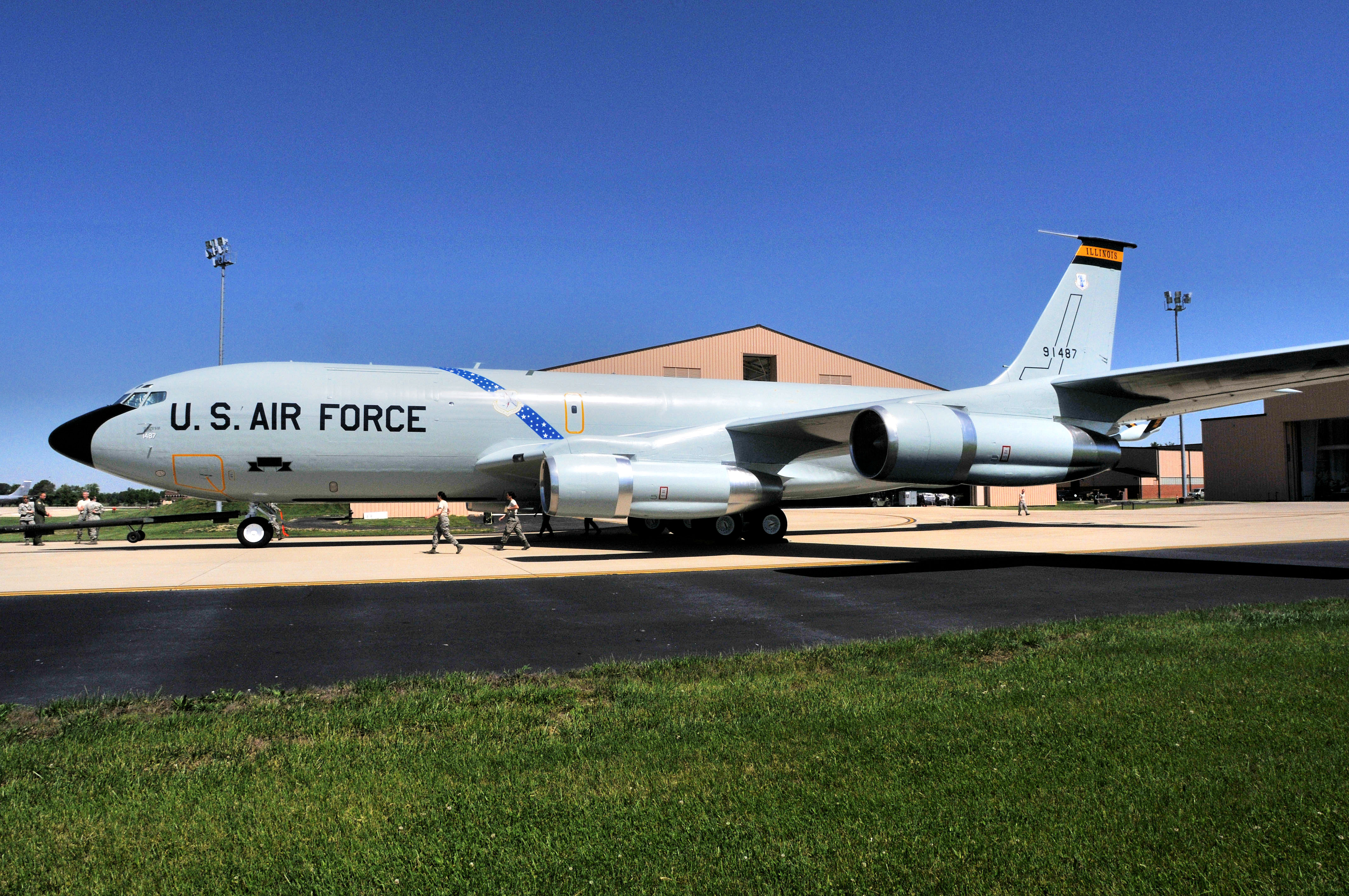
- 108th Air Refueling Squadron KC-135A Stratotanker being prepared to go on static display in 1976 SAC markings (Note: Aircraft is Boeing KC-135A-BN Stratotanker, serial 59-1487.)
- Active: 1917–1919; 1927–1943; 1947–1953; 1953–present
- Country: United States
- Allegiance: Illinois
- Branch: Air National Guard
- Role: Aerial refueling
- Size: Squadron
- Part of: Illinois Air National Guard
- Garrison/HQ: Scott Air Force Base, Illinois
- Nickname: "Mid America Militia"

Commanders
- Lt Col: Steven Olson

Insignia
- 108th Air Refueling Squadron emblem

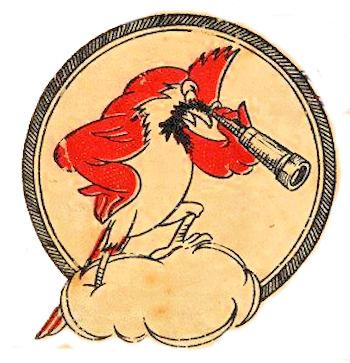
- 108th Observation Squadron emblem

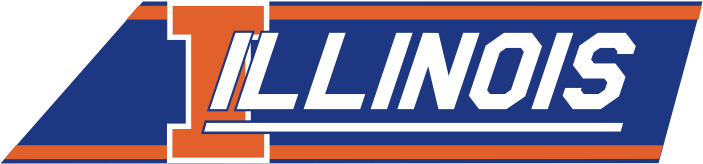
- Tail stripe

The 108th Air Refueling Squadron is a unit of the Illinois Air National Guard 126th Air Refueling Wing located at Scott Air Force Base, Illinois. The 108th is equipped with the KC-135R Stratotanker.

The squadron is a descendant organization of the World War I 108th Aero Squadron, established on 27 August 1917. It was reformed on 1 July 1927, as the 108th Observation Squadron, and is one of the 29 original National Guard Observation Squadrons of the United States Army National Guard formed before World War II.

== History ==
=== World War I ===
The 108th Air Refueling Squadron origins date to 27 August 1917 when the 108th Aero Squadron was formed at Kelly Field, Texas. The personnel at the time was composed primarily of men from the upper Southern and Midwest, coming from the recruit depot at Fort Thomas, Kentucky. At Kelly, the squadron was put in a military indoctrination course of training until being ordered for overseas service on 26 October. It was moved to the Aviation Concentration Center, Garden City, Long Island. It arrived at Mineola Field on 3 November 1917 where it was prepared and equipped for overseas duty. On 7 December, it was ordered to proceed by train to St. John's, Newfoundland where, on 10 December, it boarded the SS Tuscania, and proceeded across the Atlantic and arrived at Liverpool, England on 26 December. It then moved by train to the English Channel port of Southampton, where it waited at a Rest Camp for several days before crossing to Le Havre, France on 28 December. It again waited for transportation at Le Havre before finally arriving at the Replacement Concentration Center, AEF, St. Maixent Replacement Barracks, France, arriving on 2 January 1918.

At St. Maixent, the squadron was placed in quarantine for several weeks due to the presence of mumps. Finally, on 20 February, it was ordered to proceed to the 3d Air Instructional Center (3d AIC), Issoudun Aerodrome, in Central France, arriving on 21 February. It was first assigned to Field No. 2 where it was put to work in the Aero Repair Department while its permanent buildings were under construction at the main field. In May, the squadron was moved to its permanent quarters and buildings where it remained until after the Armistice with Germany in November 1918. It returned to the United States in late May 1918. Arrived at Mitchel Field, New York, where the squadron members were demobilized and returned to civilian life.

=== Illinois National Guard ===
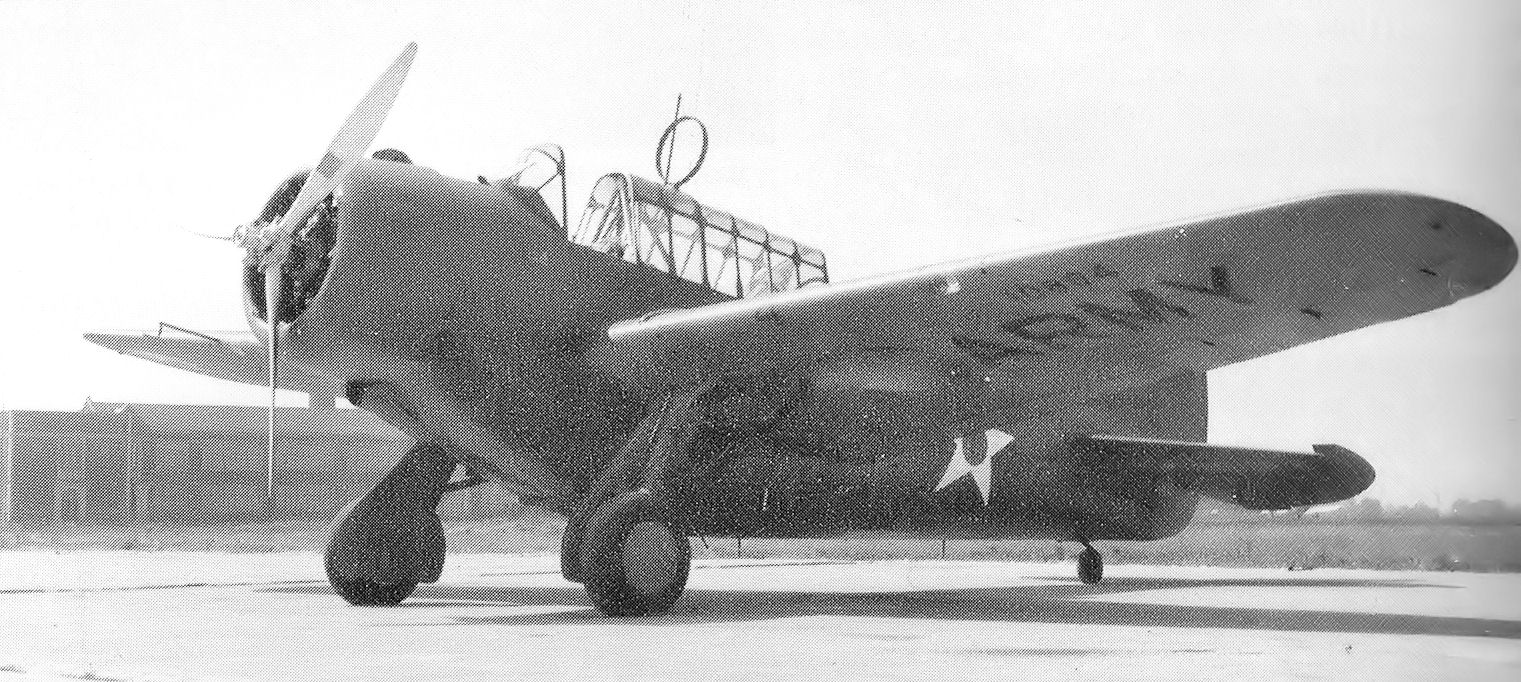
108th OS North American O-47B 39-108-04, likely at Midway Airport, 1942

In June 1927 the 108th Aero Squadron was re-activated, and designated the 108th Observation Squadron, 33d Division Aviation at Chicago Municipal Airport, Illinois. In July 1927 the unit received federal recognition; the squadron was authorized 16 officers, 74 enlisted and was assigned PT-1 Trusty aircraft. During the ensuing years, membership in the 108th Observation Squadron was a coveted assignment. Applicants were said to have been on waiting lists for as much as four years prior to being called.

In 1930, Douglas O-2H biplanes were assigned to the 108th Observation Squadron, followed by Douglas O-38 biplanes in 1935. No less than George C. Marshall was a member of the 33d Division from November 1933 to August 1936 as a senior instructor. During the next 10 years, the 108th performed outstanding civic service to the State of Illinois, dropping medicine and relief supplies to many of the towns in central and southern Illinois that were isolated by floodwaters, tornadoes, and fires. Captain Wilson V. Newhall, later to become the first chief of staff of the Illinois Air National Guard was awarded the Distinguished Service Medal during flood duty, in 1937, as a member of the 108th Observation Squadron.

=== World War II ===
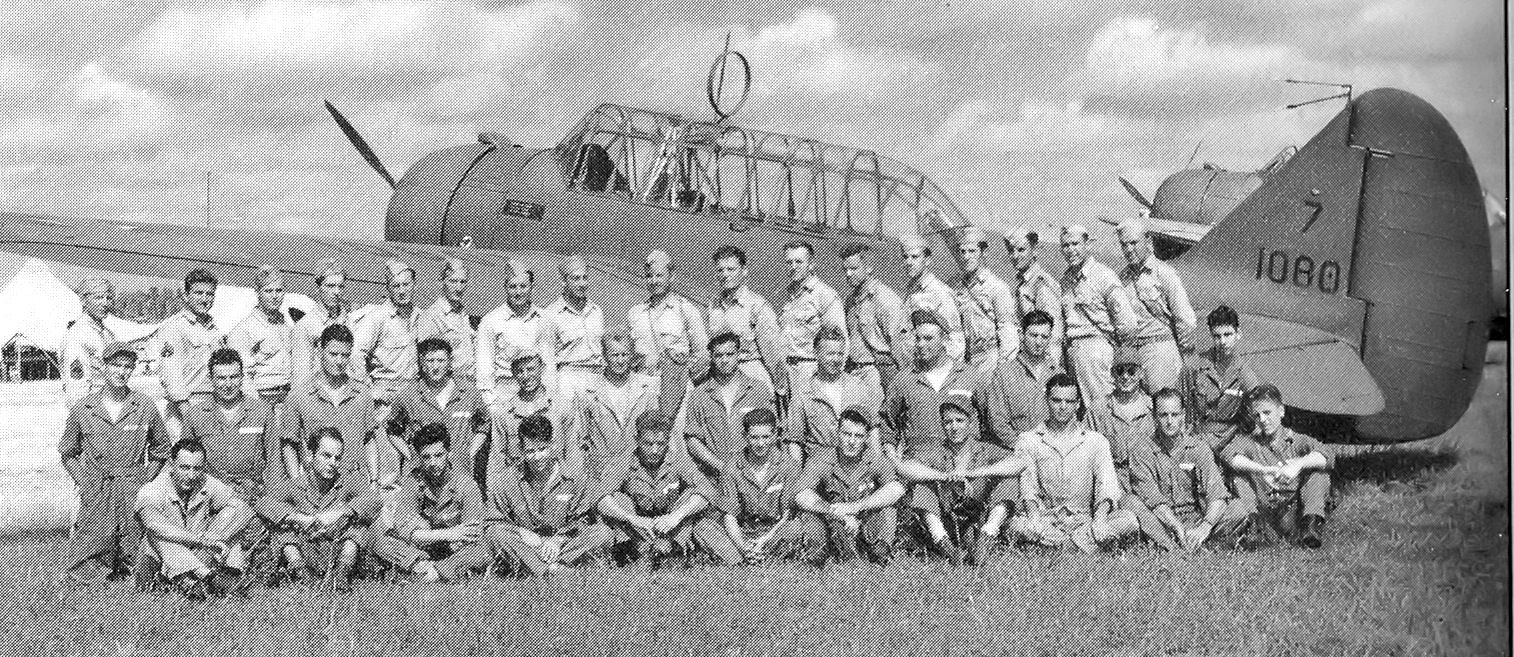
108th Observation Squadron maintenance crew at Howard Field, Panama, with an O-47 (39-108-07)

After war broke out in Europe in 1939, preparedness for war increased in the United States. As part of the preparedness program, 4,800 members of the 33d Division, including the 108th Squadron were mobilized and placed on active duty in February 1941. The unit reequipped with the North American O-47 biplanes and initially trained at Chicago Municipal Airport in Chicago. The unit remained in Chicago until 14 January 1942 when it was assigned to the Caribbean Air Force after the Japanese attack on Pearl Harbor and arrived at Río Hato Army Air Base, Panama. The stay at Rio Hato was brief, however, as the squadron was moved to Howard Field in the Canal Zone on 19 January.

At Howard Field, the squadron was busy on patrol and communications flights along the Atlantic and Pacific Panamanian coast lines and within the far-flung command. The 108th also acquired several Stinson L-1's during this period along with a P-36A, one A-18, two L- l's and two L-4A's all based at Howard Field.

One of the L-4A's was transferred to the dedicated Tow Target Squadron at Howard Field on 28 February 1943, while the rare Curtiss A-18, to the relief of the hard-pressed maintenance crews, was transferred to the Technical School at Rio Hato on 3 April 1943. This was the only A-18 to serve operationally with a line combat unit during World War II.

The units first Douglas B-18 Bolo was added in February 1943. The squadron conducted one operational mission with this aircraft, along the "Pacific coast of Colombia" on 24 February. By 25 June 1943, by which time the designation had been changed to a more realistic 108th Reconnaissance Squadron (Special), the mission handed the Squadron were ever more complex and demanding, and the alterations to the equipment reflected this. Another Douglas B-18 (36-275) had been added in May 1943, the Squadron also gained small numbers of Piper L-4A's, Curtiss 0-52's (undocumented but recalled by Squadron members), and four Bell P-39N Airacobras.

In November 1943, the threat to the Panama Canal had decreased sufficiently that the 108th Reconnaissance Squadron was inactivated in the Canal Zone, and the personnel were reassigned to other units in one of the combat theaters.

=== Illinois Air National Guard ===
The 108th Reconnaissance Squadron was redesignated the 108th Bombardment Squadron (Light) and allotted to the National Guard on 24 May 1946. It was organized at Chicago Municipal Airport, and was extended federal recognition on 29 June 1947. The 108th Bombardment Squadron was equipped with B-26 Invader light bombers and was assigned to the Illinois ANG 126th Bombardment Group.

==== Korean War Activation ====
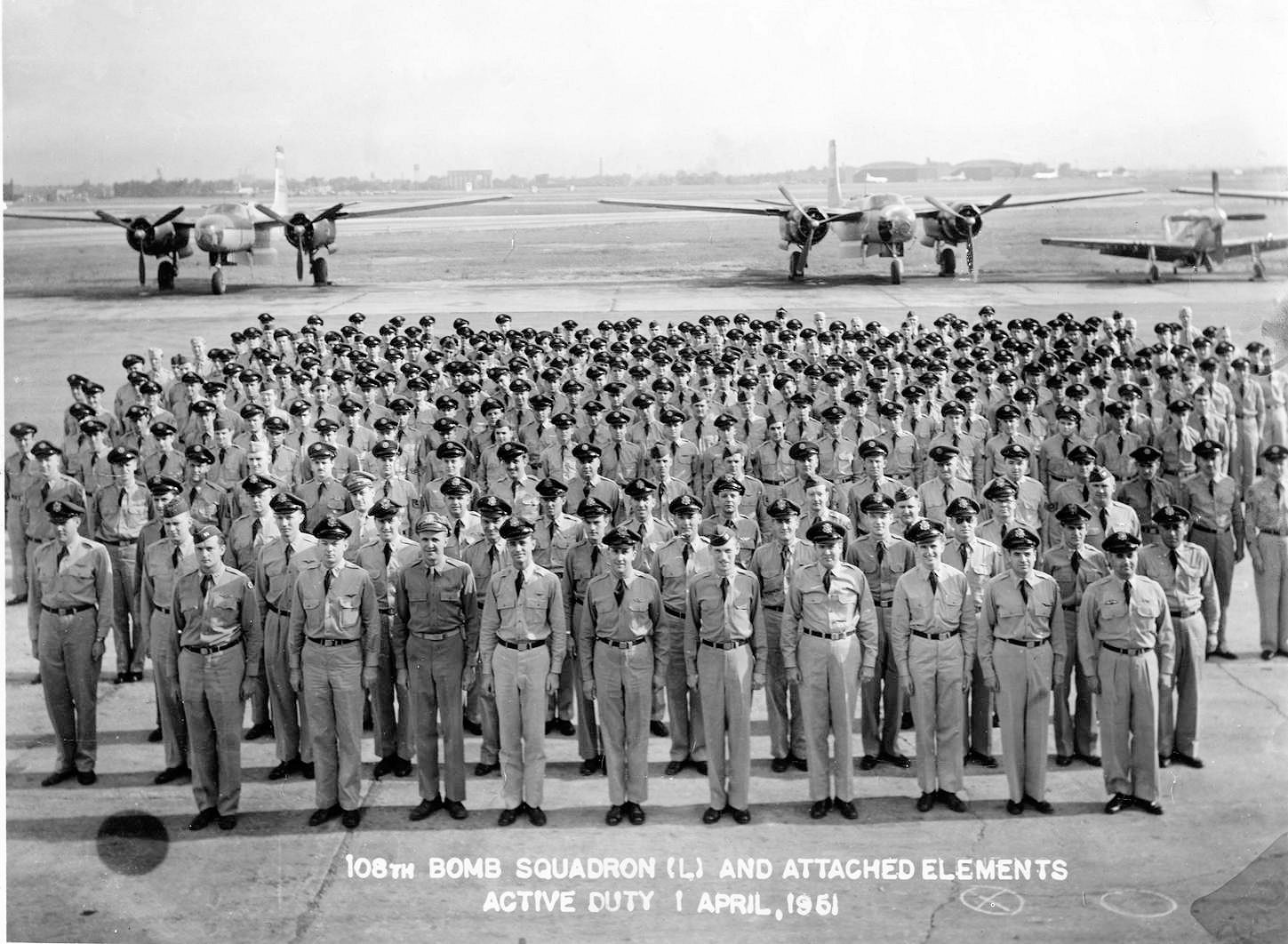
108th Bombardment Squadron – Korean War activation Formation, 1 April 1951

The unit was ordered to active service on 1 April 1951 as a result of the Korean War. The unit was initially assigned to Tactical Air Command at Langley Air Force Base, Virginia. The wing moved to Bordeaux-Merignac Air Base, France with the first elements arriving in November 1951. The 126th Wing was assigned to United States Air Forces in Europe. By 10 November, Bordeaux was considered an operational base and was assigned to the Twelfth Air Force.

At Bordeaux, the 126th consisted of the 108th, 168th and 180th Bombardment Squadrons (Light). (Note: The aircraft were marked by various color bands on the vertical stabilizer and rudder. Black/Yellow/Blue for the 108th; Black/Yellow/Red for the 168th, and Black/Yellow/Green for the 180th). It flew B-26s for training and maneuvers and stayed at Bordeaux AB until being transferred to Laon-Couvron Air Base, France on 25 May 1952 where it remained for the balance of the year.

==== Cold War ====
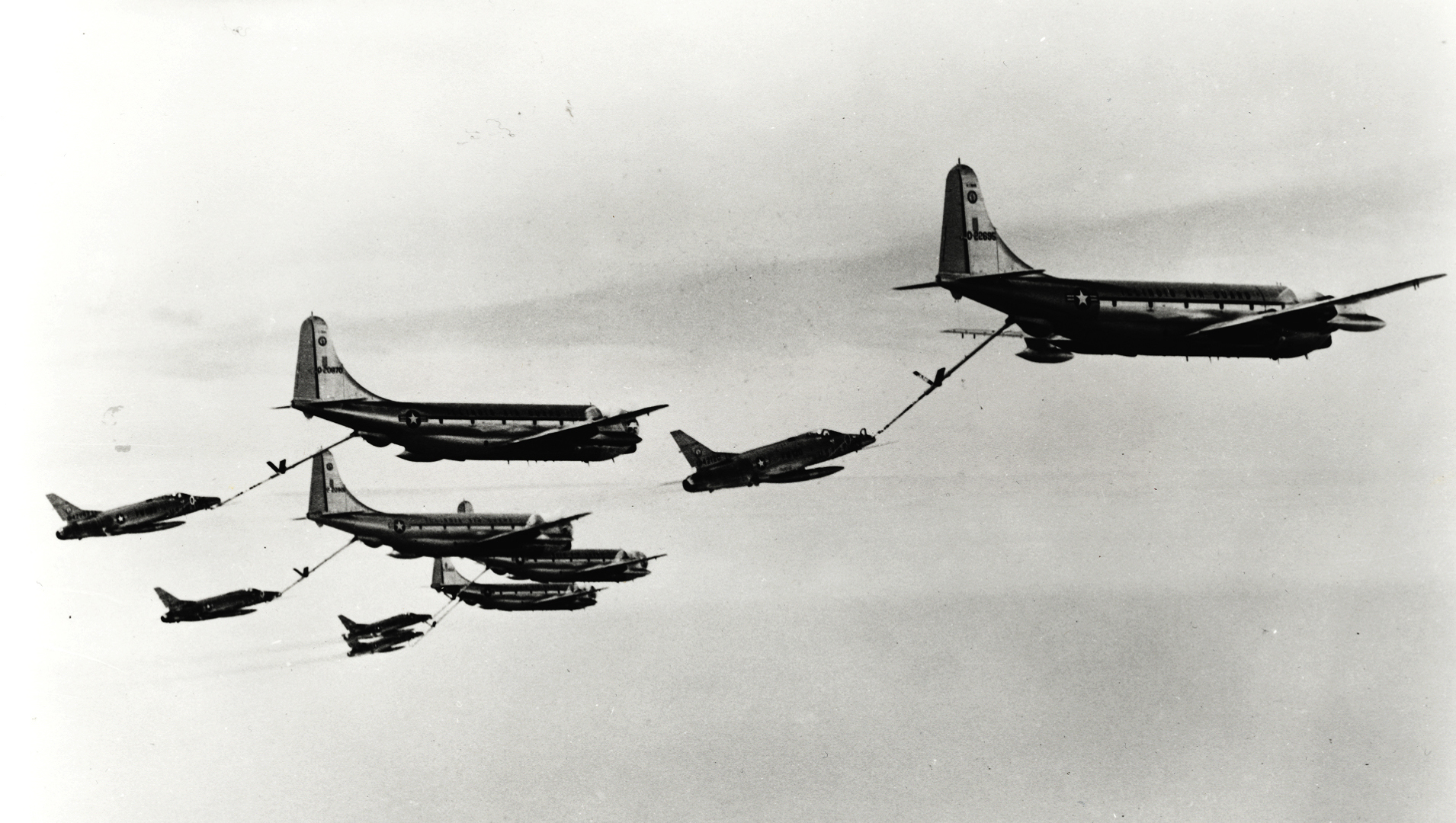
108th Air Refueling Squadron KC-97 Stratofreighters refueling F-100 Super Sabres during Operation Ready Go, the first all Air National Guard non-stop deployment of fighter aircraft to Europe

After returning from France, was re-equipped with F-51D Mustangs due to the limited availability of jets which were being used by the USAF in the Korean War. In early 1955, was upgraded to new F-84F Thunderstreak jet fighters. In 1957 the 108th participated in the Ricks Trophy Race. In 1958, the 126th was re-designated as the 126th Air Defense Group and was transferred from TAC to Air Defense Command (ADC). ADC re-equipped the 108th, now a Fighter-Interceptor Squadron with day/nigh/all-weather F-86L Sabre Interceptor aircraft, and the squadron stood a 24/7 air defense alert at O'Hare IAP.

In July 1961, the 126th was realigned from an air defense mission to becoming the first Air National Guard air refueling group under Tactical Air Command. It was re-equipped with KC-97 Stratofreighters and began worldwide aerial refueling operations. In 1963, the 108th was the first squadron to mid-air refuel the elite Air Force Thunderbirds, and in 1964, it participated in Operation "Ready Go", the first all United States Air National Guard (ANG) non-stop deployment of fighter aircraft to Europe.

In 1966 the squadron began a rotational deployment to Rhein-Main Air Base in support of Operation Creek Party. Which provided USAFE an air refueling capability. The Creek Party deployment rotations lasted until 1976, and over the decade the 108th saw millions of pounds of jet fuel off-loaded and millions of miles flown, all accident free.

In July 1976 the KC-97s were retired and the parent 126th was transferred to Strategic Air Command, receiving jet KC-135A Stratotankers. These aircraft were later upgraded to "E" models in 1983 and finally replaced with "R" models in 2008.

On 19 December 1990, President Bush ordered 268 members of the 126th Air Refueling Wing, the 108th Air Refueling Squadron and elements of the 126th Consolidated Aircraft Maintenance Squadron federalized for active duty during the 1991 Gulf Crisis. During Operation Desert Storm, the squadron performed air refueling operations as part of the 1709th Air Refueling Wing (Provisional), stationed at King Abdul Aziz Air Base, Jeddah, Saudi Arabia, and as part of the 1712th Air Refueling Wing (Provisional), stationed at Abu Dhabi, UAE, until being returned to Illinois state control on 22 March 1991.

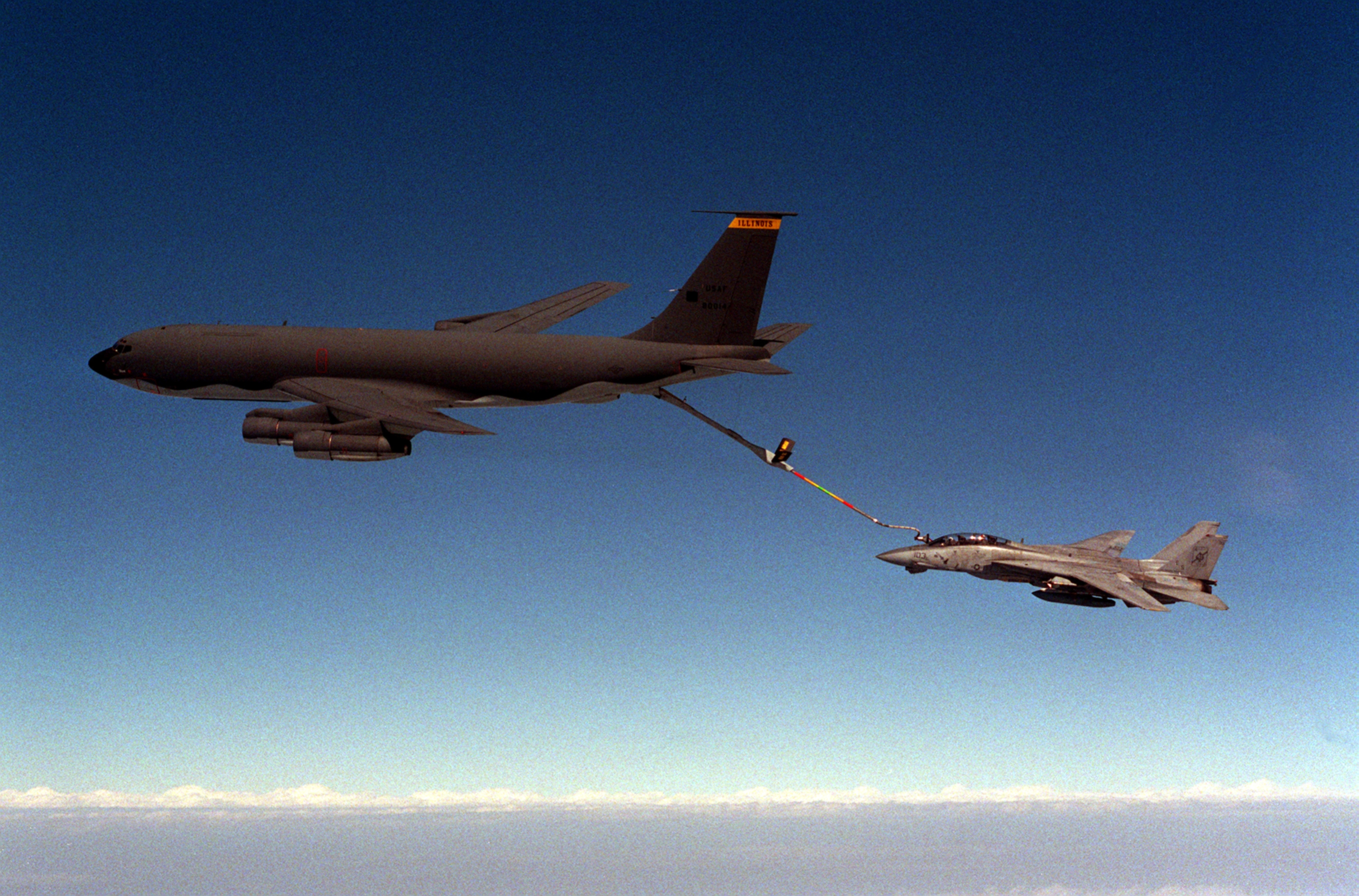
A 108th Air Refueling Squadron KC-135 refueling a US Navy F-14 Tomcat during the 1991 Gulf War

==== Twenty-first century ====
The squadron relocated to Scott Air Force Base in 1999 from Chicago's O'Hare International Airport as part of the recommendations for base closure made by the Base Realignment and Closure Commission.

After the September 11 terrorist attacks, the 126th Air Refueling Wing has been tasked on several occasions for deployment to United States Air Forces Central. Elements of the wing have been assembled and deployed as the 108th Expeditionary Air Refueling Squadron as part of AEF packages, providing air refueling to combat aircraft for the American War in Afghanistan and Iraq War during the 2000s.

In its 2005 BRAC Recommendations, DoD recommended to realign Grand Forks Air Force Base, North Dakota. It would distribute the 319th Air Refueling Wing's KC-135R aircraft to the 126th Air Refueling Wing (12 aircraft) and several other institutions. The 126th would retire its eight KC-135E aircraft. Scott would receive KC-135R model aircraft to replace older, higher maintenance KC-135E models.

== Lineage ==
802d Aero Squadron

- Organized as 108th Aero Squadron on 27 August 1917 (Note: This unit is not related to the 108th Aero Squadron (Service) that was activated at Rich Field, Texas in March 1918, moved to Carlstrom Field, Florida that month, redesignated Squadron B. Carlstrom Field in July and demobilized in November 1918.)

Redesignated 802d Aero Squadron on 1 February 1918
Redesignated 802d Aero Squadron (Repair) on 21 February 1918
Demobilized on 11 June 1919
Reconstituted and consolidated with the 108th Observation Squadron on 20 October 1936

108th Air Refueling Squadron

- Constituted as the 108th Observation Squadron and allotted to the Illinois NG

Activated on 1 July 1927
Consolidated with the 802d Aero Squadron on 20 October 1936
Ordered to active service on 3 February 1941
Redesignated 108th Observation Squadron (Medium) on 13 January 1942
Redesignated 108th Observation Squadron on 4 July 1942
Redesignated 108th Reconnaissance Squadron (Special) on 25 June 1943
Inactivated on 1 November 1943

- Redesignated 108th Bombardment Squadron, Light and allotted to the National Guard on 24 May 1946

Extended federal recognition on 29 June 1947
Federalized and ordered to active service on 1 April 1951
Relieved from active duty and returned to Illinois state control on 1 January 1953
Redesignated 108th Fighter-Bomber Squadron on 1 January 1953
Redesignated 108th Fighter-Interceptor Squadron on 1 July 1955
Redesignated 108th Air Refueling Squadron, Tactical on 1 July 1961
Redesignated 108th Air Refueling Squadron, Heavy on 1 January 1977
Federalized and ordered to active service on: 19 December 1990
Relieved from active duty and returned to Illinois State Control: 22 March 1991
Redesignated 108th Air Refueling Squadron on 16 March 1992

=== Assignments ===
- Post Headquarters, Kelly Field, 27 August-1 November 1917
- Aviation Concentration Center, 1 November-7 December 1917
- Replacement Concentration Center, AEF, 2 January-21 February 1918
- 3d Aviation Instruction Center, 21 February 1918 – April 1919
- Commanding General, Services of Supply, April-27 May 1919
- Post Headquarters, Mitchel Field, 27 May-11 June 1919
- Illinois NG (divisional aviation, 33d Division), 1 July 1927
- Second Army, 3 February 1941
- II Air Support Command, 1 September 1941
- 72d Observation (later Reconnaissance) Group, 26 September 1941 – 1 November 1943
- 126th Bombardment Group (later 126th Composite Group, 126th Bombardment Group), 29 June 1947 – 1 January 1953
- 126th Fighter-Bomber Group (later 126th Fighter-Interceptor Group, 126th Air Refueling Group), 1 January 1953
- 126th Air Refueling Wing, 1 December 1974
- 126th Operations Group, 3 February 1992 – present

=== Stations ===
- Kelly Field, Texas, 27 August 1917
- Aviation Concentration Center, Garden City, New York, 1 November-7 December 1917
- St. Maixent Replacement Barracks, France, 2 January 1918
- Issoudun Aerodrome, France, 21 Feb 1918-c. Apr 1919
- Mitchel Field, New York, c. 27 May-11 Jun 1919
- Chicago Municipal Airport, Illinois, 1 July 1927 – 28 December 1941
- Rio Hato Army Air Base, Panama, 14 January 1942
- Howard Field, Canal Zone, 19 January 1942 – 1 November 1943
- Chicago Municipal Airport, Illinois 29 June 1947 – 1 April 1951
- [angley Air Force Base, Virginia] 1 April – 1 November 1951
- Bordeaux-Merignac Air Base, France 1 November 1951 – 25 May 1952
- Laon-Couvron Air Base, France, 25 May 1952 – 31 December 1952
- Chicago Midway Airport, Illinois, 1 January 1953 – 31 July 1999
- O'Hare International Airport, Illinois, April 1954
- Scott Air Force Base, Illinois, 31 July 1999 – present

=== Aircraft ===
- Included PT-1, BT-1, and 0-2 during period 1927–1931
- Douglas O-38, 1931–1941
- Douglas O-2, 1931–1934
- Douglas O-31, 1935–1941
- O-49 Vigilant, 1941–1943
- O-51 Dragonfly, 1941
- North American O-47, 1942–1943)
- P-39N Airacobra, 1942–1943
- A-18 Shrike, 1943
- P-36 Hawk, 1943
- B-26 Invader, 1947–1953
- F-51D Mustang, 1953–1955
- F-84F Thunderstreak, 1955–1957
- F-86L Sabre Interceptor, 1957–1958
- KC-97 Stratofreighter, 1961–1976
- KC-135A Stratotanker, 1976–1983
- KC-135E Stratotanker, 1983–2008
- KC-135R Stratotanker, 2008 – present

== See also ==
- List of American aero squadrons
- List of observation squadrons of the United States Army National Guard
