= Strike Force =

Strike Force may refer to:

== Arts, entertainment, and media ==
=== Games ===
- Strike Force (video game), a 1991 arcade game
- Commandos: Strike Force, a 2006 video game
- Dynasty Warriors: Strikeforce, a 2009 video game
- Marvel Strike Force, a 2018 video game

=== Television ===
- Strike Force (TV series), a 1981 ABC television series starring Robert Stack
- "Strike Force" (Gotham), an episode of Gotham
- Strike Force (1975 film), a 1975 television film

=== Other uses in arts, entertainment, and media ===
- Strike Force, a 2003 film also known as The Librarians
- Strikeforce: Morituri, a science fiction comic published by Marvel Comics
- Strikeforce (comics), a 2019 comic series published by Marvel Comics
- Strike Force: Organized Crime and the Government, a 1972 book by Clark R. Mollenhoff

== Government and military ==
=== United States ===
- Strike Force Model, a model of law enforcement employed by the United States Department of Justice
  - United States Organized Crime Strike Force, a historical program of the United States Department of Justice
  - Medicare Fraud Strike Force, a program of the United States Department of Justice
  - Strike forces, teams as part of the Organized Crime Drug Enforcement Task Force, a program of the United States Department of Justice
- Composite Air Strike Force, United States Air Force unit
- MIKE Force (Mobile Strike Force Command), historical United States Special Forces unit in Vietnam War
- 2nd Brigade Combat Team, 2nd Battalion, 502nd Infantry Regiment Strike Force of the 101st Airborne Division, a unit in the United States Army

== Sports ==
- Strike Force (professional wrestling), a professional wrestling tag team
- Strikeforce (mixed martial arts), a defunct mixed martial arts promotion
  - Strikeforce: Young Guns

== See also ==
- Force de frappe (Strike Force), the French nuclear deterrent
- Quick reaction force
- Strike Team (disambiguation)
- Theatre Strike Force, a college improvisation troupe
