= Gold Strike =

Gold Strike may refer to:

- Gold Strike (drink), alcoholic drink
- Gold Strike (horse), Canadian champion racehorse
- Gold Strike Tunica, casino hotel in Tunica Resorts, Mississippi, U.S.
- Gold Strike Resorts, a Nevada, U.S., family of gaming companies
  - Gold Strike Hotel, near Boulder City, now the Hoover Dam Lodge
  - Gold Strike Hotel and Gambling Hall, Jean, now Terrible's Hotel & Casino
- Gold Strike Canyon-Sugarloaf Mountain Traditional Cultural Property, Nevada, U.S.
