= Curtiss A-12 Shrike =

American attack aircraft

A-12 Shrike
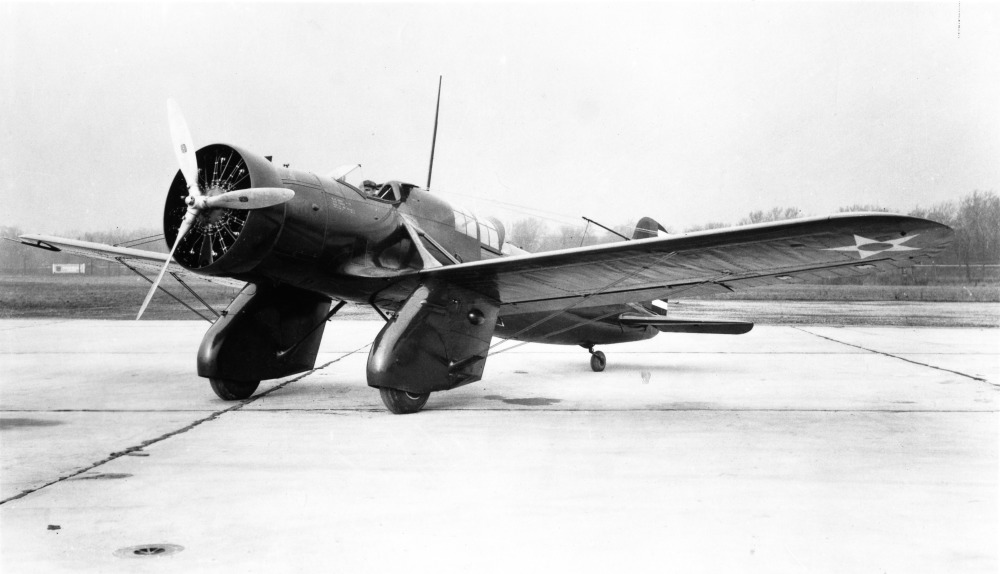

General information
- Type: Ground-attack aircraft
- Manufacturer: Curtiss
- Primary users: United States Army Air Corps Nationalist Chinese Air Force
- Number built: 46

History
- Introduction date: 1933
- Retired: 1942
- Developed from: XA-8 Shrike; YA-10 Shrike

The Curtiss A-12 Shrike was the United States Army Air Corps' second monoplane ground-attack aircraft, and its main attack aircraft through most of the 1930s. It was based on the A-8, but had a radial engine instead of the A-8's inline, water-cooled engine, as well as other changes.

== Design and development ==
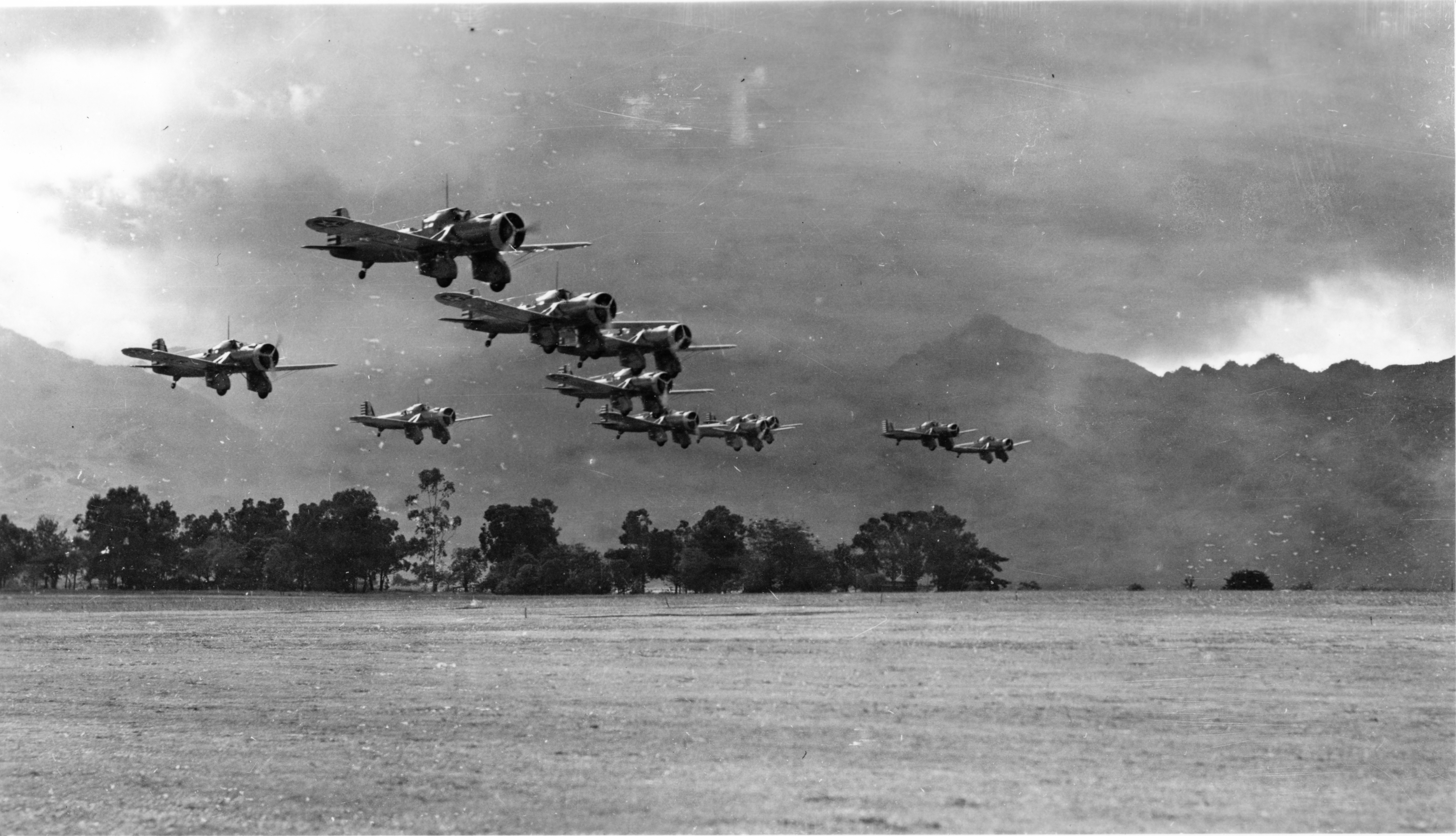
Formation of Curtiss A-12 Shrikes during exercises near Wheeler Field, Oahu, Hawaii circa 1940.

The Model 60 was developed from advancements of the A-8 and the experimental YA-10. However, it became obsolete after a short use period, mainly because of fast-improving aviation technology, as well as the USAAC's desire for multi-engined attack aircraft.

The most obvious difference between the A-12 and the A-8 is the air-cooled, radial engine in the A-12, which replaced the A-8's inline, water-cooled engine. This was a response to the USAAC's move toward a preference for radial engines, especially in attack aircraft. The rationale behind this preference is that the radial engine has a lower profile, making it less vulnerable to ground fire, and a simpler cooling mechanism, which is also less prone to groundfire, as well as overall maintenance problems.

These aircraft retained the open cockpit introduced in the A-8 production batch, and carried the same weapons load. In an attempt to improve pilot/observer co-operation, the rear cockpit was moved forward sufficiently for its glazed covering to form a continuation of the fuselage decking behind the pilot's cockpit.

Nine USAAF A-12s were still in service at Hickam Field on 7 December 1941, but they saw no combat.

== Operational history ==
On 15 August 1937, during the start of the Sino-Japanese War/World War II in the Battle of Shanghai, the Imperial Japanese Navy launched 45 planes from the fleet aircraft carrier Kaga targeting Chinese Air Force assets in the province of Jiangsu surrounding Shanghai; thirteen Aichi D1A1 dive-bombers were unable to find their intended target in Suzhou and so diverted to Jianqiao Airbase instead, but stumbled upon A-12 Shrikes of the 26th and 27th Squadrons of the 9th Attack Group at the Chao'er auxiliary airbase preparing for strikes against Japanese positions in Shanghai, and a dogfight ensued between two unlikely dogfighting opponents: two D1A1s were shot down by the Chinese A-12s, and another badly shot-up D1A1 returned to Kaga with a fatally wounded crewman.

A-12s served with the 3rd Attack Group plus the 8th and 18th Pursuit Groups. Surviving Shrikes were grounded just after Pearl Harbor was bombed in December 1941.

== Operators ==
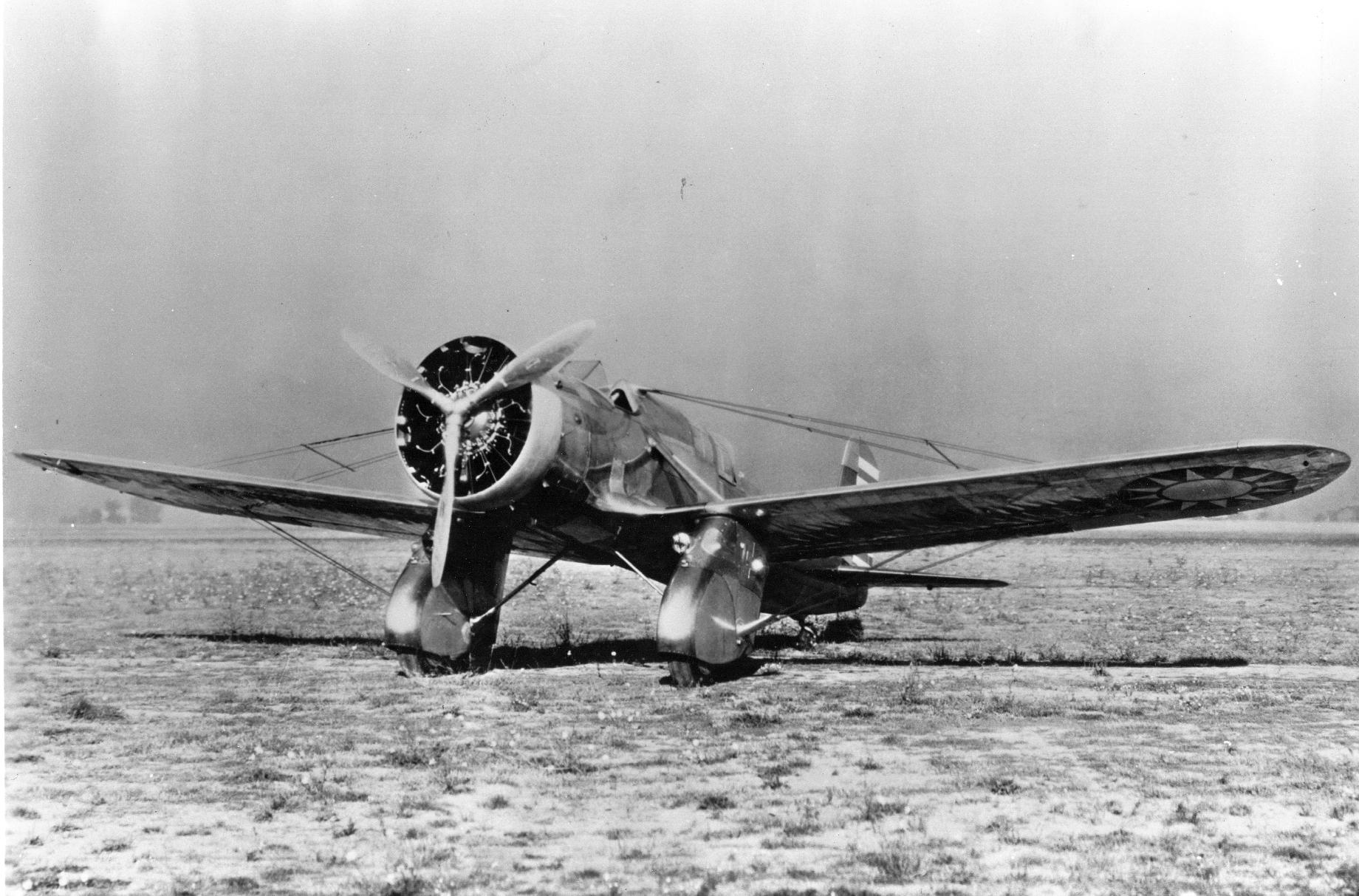
An A-12 awaiting delivery to the ROCAF

Republic of China

- Chinese Nationalist Air Force received 20 A-12 Shrikes in 1936, arming the 27th and the 28th Squadron of the 9th Group. When full-scale war broke out between Japan and China, they were used. They had initial success, including the downing of four Japanese Aichi D1A1 carrier-based dive bombers on 15 August 1937. However, after deploying in ground support missions in Shanxi, most did not survive and the few left were reassigned to training duties.

United States

- United States Army Air Corps

== Specifications (A-12 Shrike) ==
Data from Curtiss Aircraft 1907–1947, The Complete Encyclopedia of World Aircraft

General characteristics

- Crew: 2
- Length: 32 ft 3 in (9.83 m)
- Wingspan: 44 ft 0 in (13.41 m)
- Height: 9 ft 0 in (2.74 m)
- Wing area: 284 sq ft (26.4 m^{2})
- Empty weight: 3,898 lb (1,768 kg)
- Gross weight: 5,756 lb (2,611 kg)
- Powerplant: × Wright R-1820-21 Cyclone 9-cylinder air-cooled radial piston engine, 690 hp (510 kW)
- Propellers: 3-bladed fixed-pitch propeller

Performance

- Maximum speed: 177 mph (285 km/h, 154 kn)
- Cruise speed: 150 mph (240 km/h, 130 kn)
- Range: 520 mi (840 km, 450 nmi)
- Service ceiling: 15,150 ft (4,620 m)
- Rate of climb: 1,170 ft/min (5.9 m/s)

Armament

- Guns:

- 4 × forward-firing 0.30 in (7.62 mm) M1919 Browning machine guns mounted in the wheel fairings
- 1 × 0.30 in (7.62 mm) machine gun mounted in the observer's cockpit for rear defense

- Bombs: Up to 4 × 122 lb (55 kg) bombs carried under the wings or up to 10 × 30 lb (14 kg) fragmentation bombs in fuselage chutes either side of the main fuel tank

== See also ==
Related development

- Curtiss A-8
- Curtiss YA-10 Shrike

Aircraft of comparable role, configuration, and era

- Fokker XA-7
- Northrop A-17
- PZL.23 Karaś

Related lists

- List of aircraft of World War II
- List of military aircraft of the United States
