= Curtiss XA-14 =

American attack aircraft prototype

XA-14
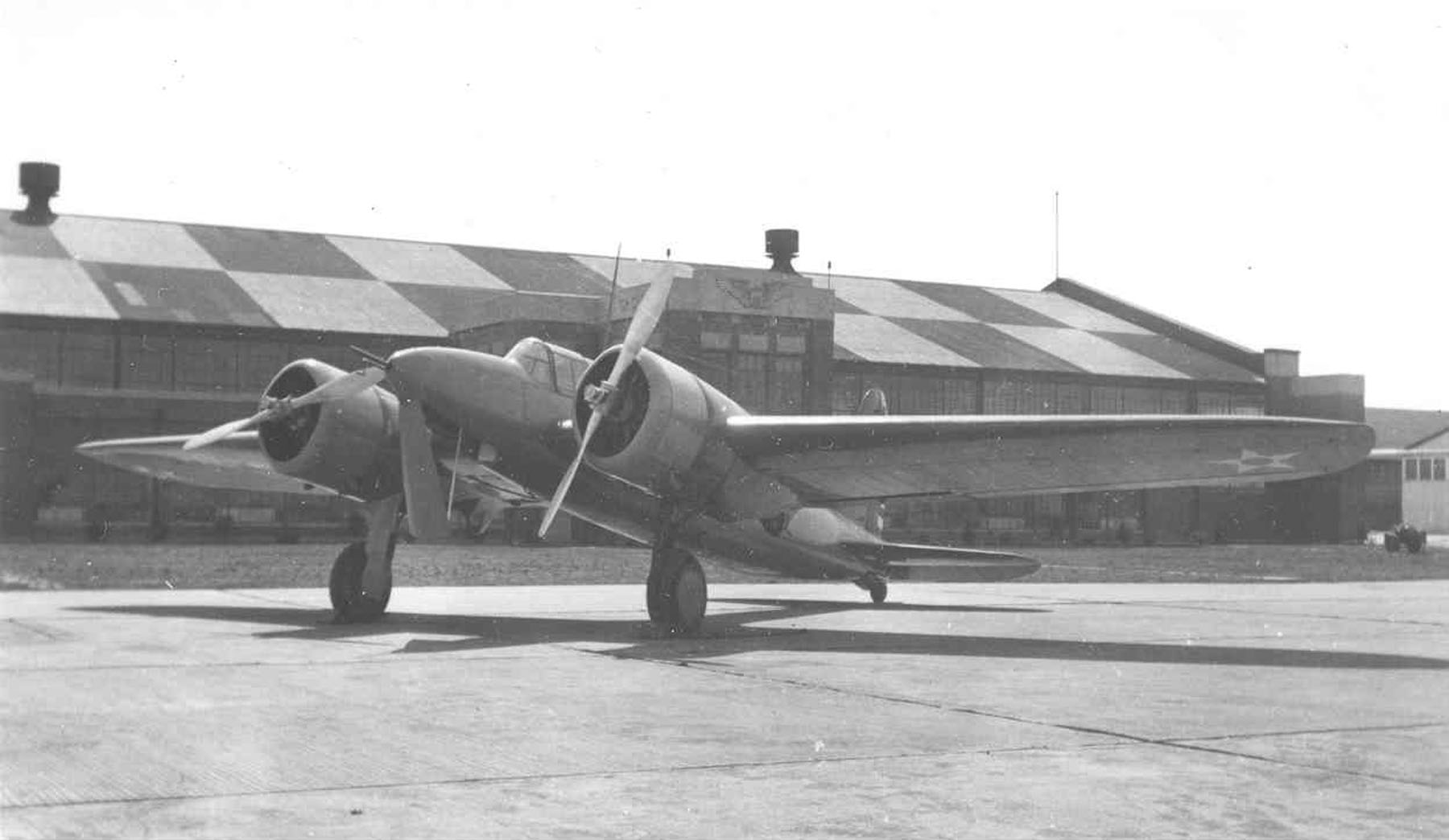
- Curtiss XA-14

General information
- Type: Ground attack
- Manufacturer: Curtiss Aeroplane and Motor Company
- Status: Prototype
- Primary user: U.S. Army Air Corps
- Number built: 1

History
- First flight: 17 July 1935
- Developed into: A-18 Shrike

The Curtiss XA-14 was a 1930s United States airplane, the first multi-engine attack aircraft tested by the United States Army Air Corps. Carrying a crew of two, it was as fast as the standard pursuit aircraft in service at the time.

== Design and development ==
Originally built as an in-house venture as the Curtiss Model 76, powered by two experimental Wright XR-1510 radial engines, flight testing was sufficiently impressive that after the USAAC appraisal the Model 76 was returned to Curtiss and fitted with two 775 hp (578 kW) Wright R-1670-5 Whirlwind engines with two-position variable-pitch propellers. This configuration was accepted by the Army with the designation XA-14. It had standard Army markings with the serial number 36-146.

The Model 76 was of all-metal construction with an oval section semimonocoque fuselage, described as "pencil slim". The XA-14 was extensively tested, at one stage being fitted with a 37 mm (1.457 in) cannon in the nose.

In July 1936, 13 developed versions, re-engined with two 850 hp (630 kW) Wright R-1820-47 Cyclone 9-cylinder radials, were ordered into production as the Y1A-18.

== Specifications (XA-14) ==
Data from Curtiss Aircraft 1907–1947

General characteristics

- Crew: 2
- Length: 40 ft 6 in (12.34 m)
- Wingspan: 59 ft 6 in (18.14 m)
- Height: 11 ft 0 in (3.35 m)
- Wing area: 530 sq ft (49 m^{2})
- Empty weight: 8,875 lb (4,026 kg)
- Gross weight: 11,656 lb (5,287 kg)
- Powerplant: 2 × Wright R-1670-5 14-cylinder two-row air-cooled radial piston engines, 775 hp (578 kW) each
- Propellers: 2-bladed two-position variable-pitch propellers

Performance

- Maximum speed: 243 mph (391 km/h, 211 kn) at sea level
- Cruise speed: 222 mph (357 km/h, 193 kn)
- Service ceiling: 28,000 ft (8,500 m)
- Rate of climb: 1,690 ft/min (8.6 m/s)

Armament

- 4 × 0.30 in (7.62 mm) M1919 Browning machine guns forward-firing
- 1 × 0.30 in (7.62 mm) machine-gun on a flexible mount in the rear cockpit
- 650 lb (290 kg) bombs in an internal bomb-bay

== See also ==
Related development

- Curtiss A-18 Shrike

Aircraft of comparable role, configuration, and era

- Bristol Blenheim

Related lists

- List of military aircraft of the United States
