= Curtiss A-18 Shrike =

American attack aircraft

A-18 Shrike II
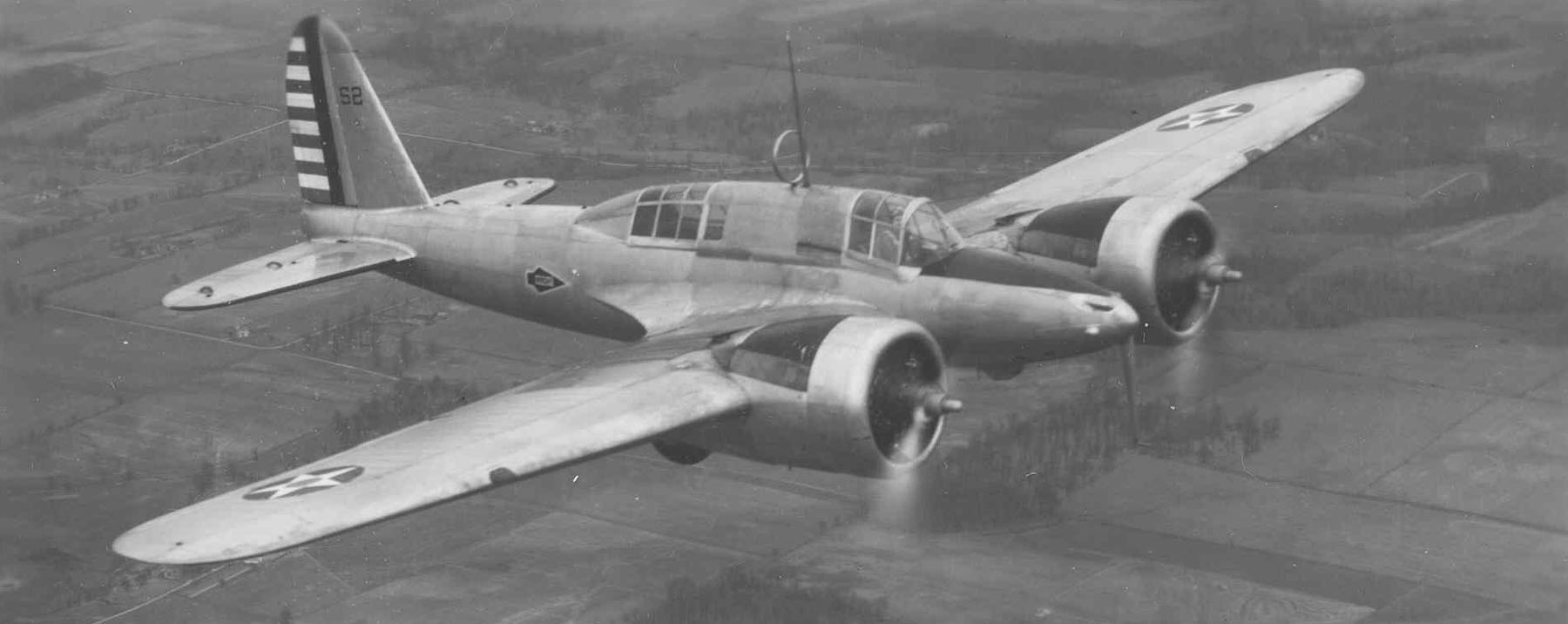
- Curtiss A-18 No. 37-52 assigned to Wright Field (Y1A-18, probably during testing)

General information
- Type: Ground-attack aircraft
- Manufacturer: Curtiss Aeroplane and Motor Company
- Status: Service test, later scrapped
- Primary user: United States Army Air Corps
- Number built: 13

History
- First flight: 3 July 1935
- Retired: 1943
- Developed from: Curtiss XA-14

The Curtiss A-18 Model 76A Shrike II was a 1930s United States twin-engine ground-attack aircraft. It was the production test version of Curtiss' A-14 Shrike.

== Design and development ==
In the years leading up to World War II, the United States Army Air Corps were interested in attack aircraft capable of carrying larger bomb loads with greater firepower. The attack aircraft design standard essentially became a light bomber with firepower only slightly less than the medium bombers being developed as the standard .30 in (7.62 mm) machine gun generally was replaced by .50 in (12.7 mm) ones on new aircraft in development.

The Curtiss YA-14 prototype that emerged in 1935 was one of the first single-mission attack aircraft. Although it looked purposeful with its slender fuselage, thin nose, and sleek streamlining, the A-14 was hampered by a lack of power, despite its two 775 hp (578 kW) Wright Whirlwind radial engines. Nevertheless, the prototype was able to achieve a maximum speed of 254 mph (409 km/h), outstripping the front line Boeing P-26 Peashooter fighter by 20 mph (32 km/h). Re-engined with 735 hp (548 kW) Curtiss R-1670-5 engines, it was delivered to the Army under serial number 36-146.

== Operational history ==
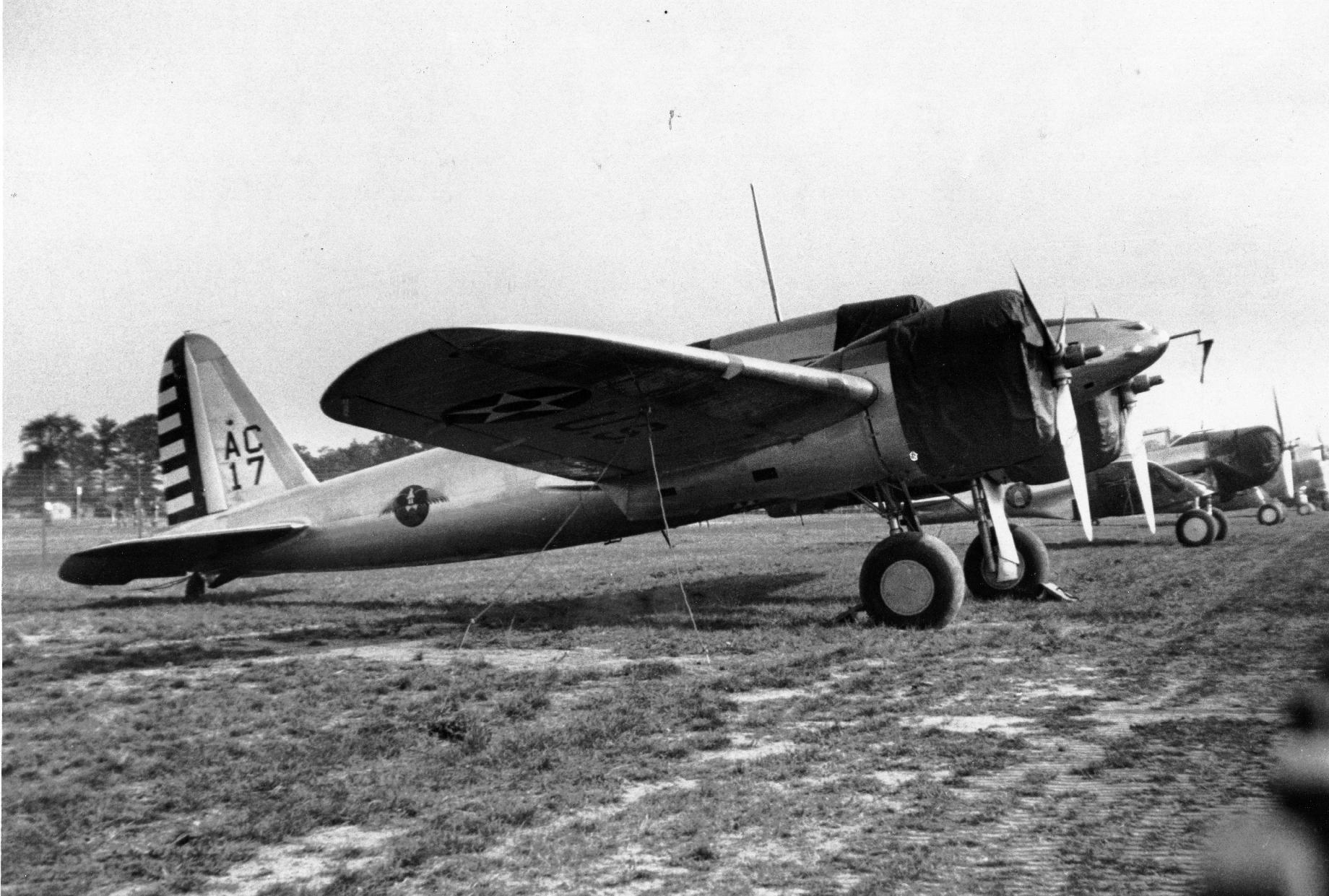
Curtiss Y1A-18 Shrike, circa 1937

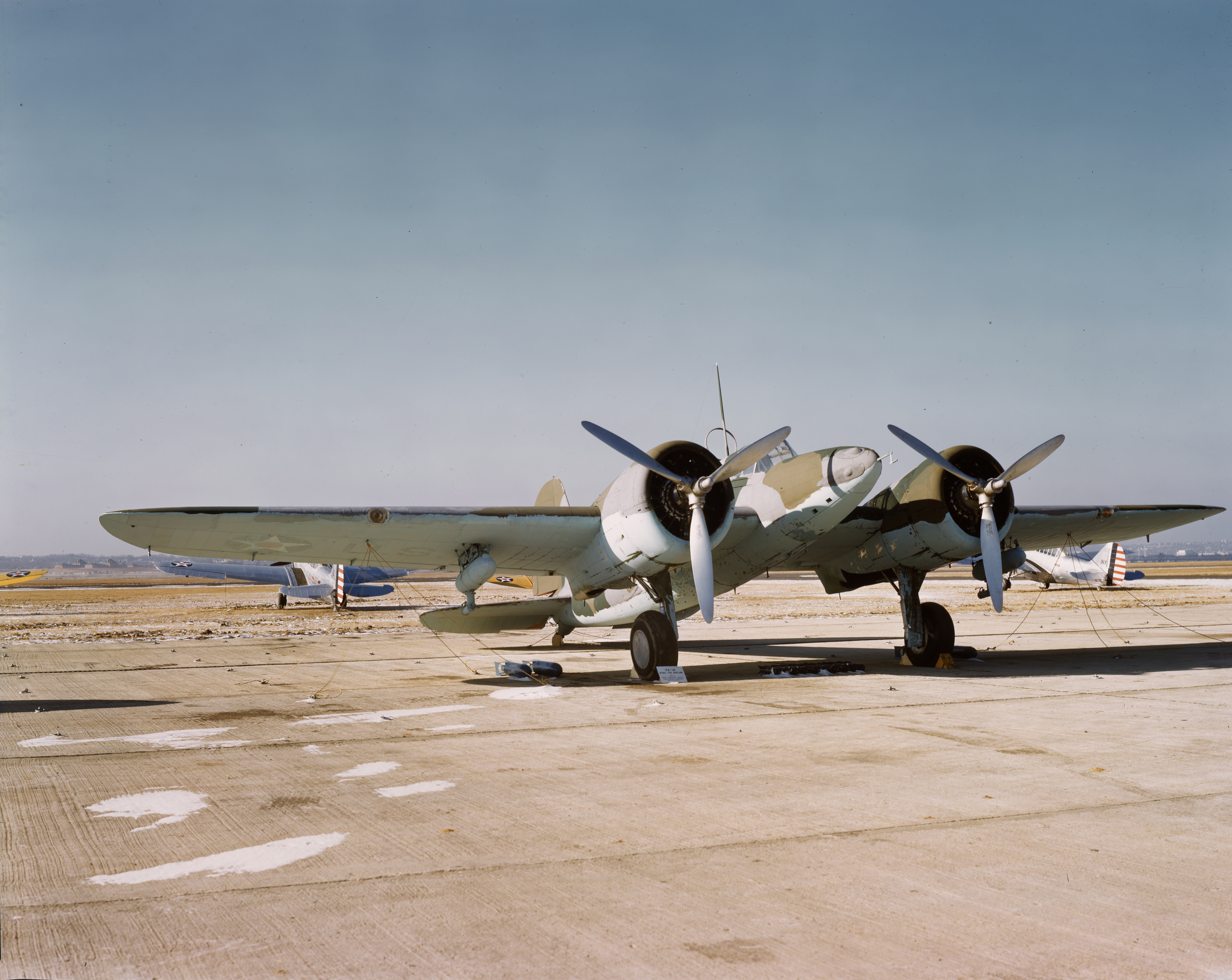
Curtiss A-18 in January, 1940

An improved variant, the Y1A-18, had upgraded 850 hp (630 kW) Wright R-1820-47 radial engines with three-blade propellers replacing the original two-blade models. Thirteen aircraft were produced, serial numbers 37-52 through 37-64, at a contract cost of $1,259,235.00, with the first example produced (Y1A-18) first flight occurring on 3 July 1935; and although successful in testing, no further production was ordered due to a lack of funds as well as the availability of more advanced aircraft (such as the Douglas A-20 Havoc) under design.

After completion of service testing, the Y1A-18s were redesignated A-18. They were assigned to the 8th Attack Squadron, 3rd Attack Group at Barksdale Field, Louisiana in 1937. The squadron won the coveted Harmon Trophy for gunnery and bombing accuracy in their first year of service. During its service with the 8th Attack Squadron, the retractable landing gear of the A-18 had an inherent weakness, with no less than eight of the 13 A-18s suffering from a landing gear collapse on landing or roll-out. The last of the A-18s with the 8th were replaced by early-model A-20 Havocs in 1941.

The A-18 was only used for a short time before being replaced by more advanced attack aircraft. After its service with the 8th AS, the aircraft were assigned to several Light Bombardment Squadrons during 1940-42, likely being used as support aircraft. The last A-18 Shrike II was retired from front line squadrons in 1942; none of the aircraft were ever used in combat.

Lastly, four of the A-18s (serials 37-52, 37-56, 37-61, and one other un-identified) were assigned to the USAAF Caribbean Air Force in late November 1941 and were based initially at Albrook Field, Panama Canal Zone. Three of the aircraft were first assigned to the Headquarters and Headquarters Squadron, 12th Pursuit Wing, while the fourth aircraft was assigned to HHS Bomber Command (later VI Bomber Command) at Albrook. The aircraft remained with these units through February 1942.

By December 1942, two or three of the aircraft were still airworthy. One was employed as a tow target tug, the other two were operated as reconnaissance aircraft by the 108th Reconnaissance Squadron (Special) from Howard Field, patrolling the approaches to the Panama Canal. A-18 serial 37-61 was damaged in a landing accident at Albrook field on 22 February 1943, and cannibalization kept at least one aircraft flying until it was grounded due to a lack of spare parts. Serial 37-56 was transferred to instructional airframe training at Howard. All were eventually scrapped in the Canal Zone by the end of 1943.

== Operators ==
United States

- United States Army Air Corps

8th Attack Squadron, 1937-1941
15th Bombardment Squadron (Light), 1940
16th Bombardment Squadron (Light), 1940-1941
24th Bombardment Squadron (Light), 1940-1942
55th Bombardment Squadron (Light), 1942

56th Bombardment Squadron (Light), 1941
57th Bombardment Squadron (Light), 1941
89th Bombardment Squadron (Light), 1941
108th Reconnaissance Squadron, 1942-1943
128th Observation Squadron, 1941-1942

== Specifications (Y1A-18) ==
Data from Curtiss Aircraft 1907–1947, The Complete Encyclopedia of World Aircraft

General characteristics

- Crew: 2
- Length: 41 ft 0 in (12.50 m)
- Wingspan: 59 ft 6 in (18.14 m) 6
- Height: 11 ft 6 in (3.51 m)
- Wing area: 530 sq ft (49 m^{2})
- Empty weight: 9,580 lb (4,345 kg)
- Gross weight: 12,849 lb (5,828 kg)
- Powerplant: 2 × Wright R-1820-47 Cyclone 9-cylinder air-cooled radial piston engines, 850 hp (630 kW) each
- Propellers: 3-bladed two-position variable-pitch propellers

Performance

- Maximum speed: 247 mph (398 km/h, 215 kn) at 2,500 ft (760 m)
- Cruise speed: 217 mph (349 km/h, 189 kn)
- Range: 651 mi (1,048 km, 566 nmi)
- Service ceiling: 25,000 ft (7,600 m)

Armament

- 4 × forward-firing .30 in (7.62 mm) M1919 Browning machine guns
- 1 × aft-firing .30 in (7.62 mm) machine gun
- 400 lb (181 kg) bombs in two wing bays
- 200 lb (91 kg) bombs or chemical smoke tanks underwing

== See also ==
Related development

- Curtiss XA-14

Aircraft of comparable role, configuration, and era

- Bloch MB.170
- Bristol Blenheim
- Dornier Do 17
- PZL.37 Łoś
- Tupolev SB

Related lists

- List of aircraft of World War II
- List of military aircraft of the United States
