= The Strike (disambiguation) =

The Strike is one of a long-running series of Comic Strip Presents... short comedy films.

The Strike may also refer to:

- The Strike (1904 film), a French film directed by Ferdinand Zecca
- The Strike (1914 film), a Swedish film directed by Victor Sjöström
- The Strike (1947 film), a Czech film
- "The Strike" (Seinfeld), an episode of Seinfeld
- The Strike (Westinghouse Studio One), an episode of Westinghouse Studio One
- Bass Pro Shops: The Strike, a video game for the Xbox 360 and Wii that is often shorted to "The Strike"
- The Strike, a working title for Ayn Rand's novel Atlas Shrugged
