= Strike Team =

Strike Team may refer to:

== Firefighting ==
- Strike Team, in the New South Wales Rural Fire Service, it is several fire trucks of the same class
- Strike Team, a special unit of firefighters in South Australia's Country Fire Service
- Strike Team, a special unit of firefighters in Victoria's Country Fire Authority; in Victoria, a Strike Team usually refers to a unit of five appliances used to fight large, campaign-sized wildfires such as those in the Black Saturday bushfires

== Special forces ==
- Strike team, a colloquialism for SWAT Team
- Strike Team, a unit composed of similar resource types in the FEMA Incident Command Structure
- Strike Team, a team of the U.S. Coast Guard's National Strike Force

== Other uses ==
- Strike Team, the fictional tactical unit on The Shield
