= Curtiss A-8 =

American attack aircraft

A-8 "Shrike"
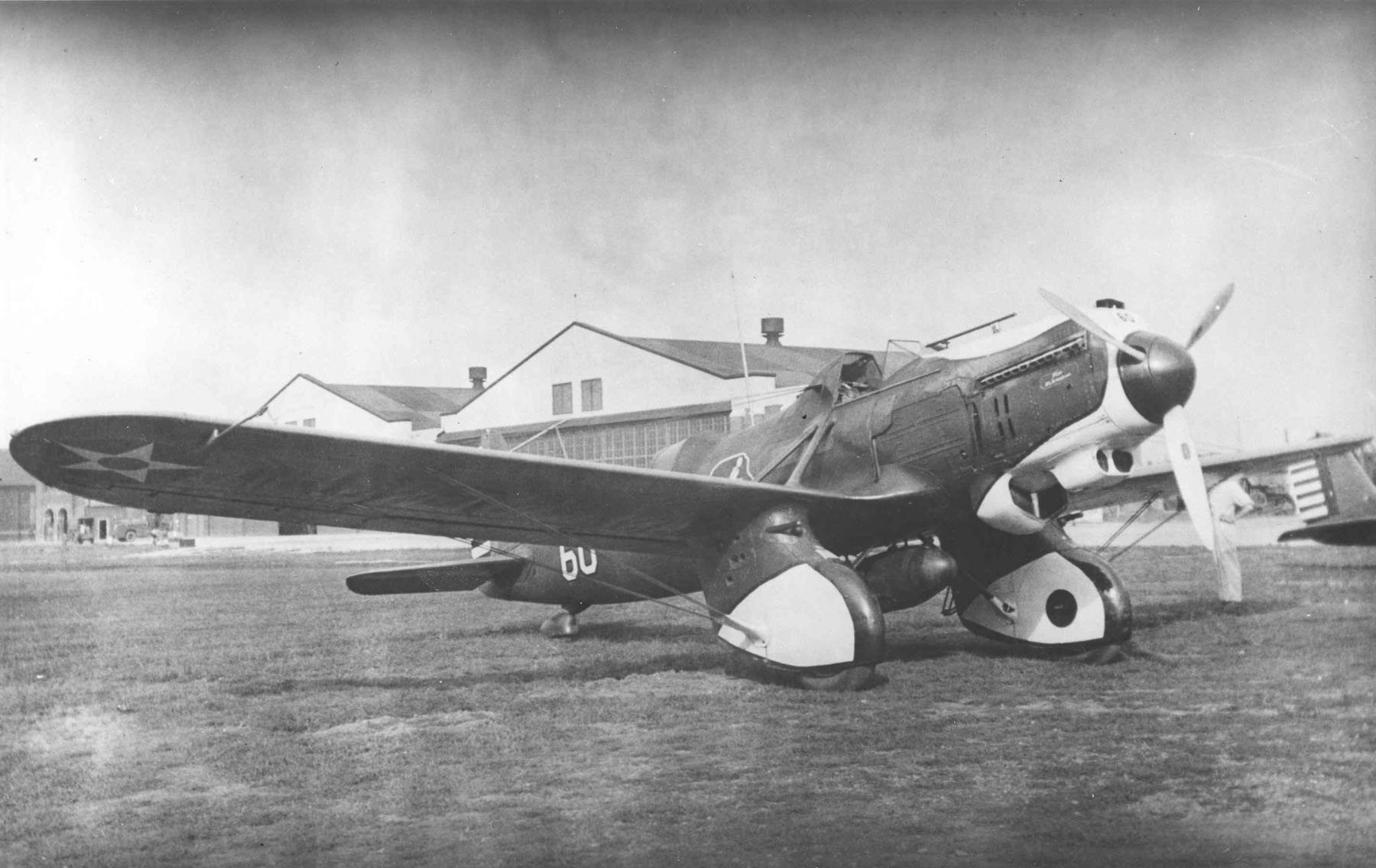
- Curtiss A-8 No.60 of the 13th Attack Squadron

General information
- Type: Attack aircraft
- Manufacturer: Curtiss Aeroplane and Motor Company
- Designer: Don Berlin
- Primary user: United States Army Air Corps

History
- Manufactured: 13
- Introduction date: April 1932
- First flight: June 1931
- Variants: YA-10 Shrike; A-12 Shrike

The Curtiss A-8 was a low-wing monoplane ground-attack aircraft built by the United States company Curtiss Aeroplane and Motor Company, designed in response to a 1929 United States Army Air Corps requirement for an attack aircraft to replace the A-3 Falcon. The Model 59 "Shrike" was designated XA-8. (Note: The "Shrike" nickname was not officially adopted.)

== Development ==
The XA-8 won a competition against the General Aviation/Fokker XA-7, after which 13 service test aircraft were ordered (five as YA-8s and eight as Y1A-8s). After the completion of testing, 11 of these aircraft were redesignated A-8.

The A-8 was the first Curtiss machine of all-metal low-wing monoplane configuration with advanced features such as automatic leading edge slats and trailing-edge flaps.

Four forward-firing .30 in (7.62 mm) machine guns were mounted in the wheel fairings, and an additional weapon of the same calibre was fitted in the observer's cockpit for rear defense. The standard bomb load was four 100 lb (45 kg) bombs.

One YA-8 was fitted with a radial engine and designated YA-10, while another was used for testing of the Curtiss V-1570 Conqueror engine as the Y1A-8A. This aircraft was redesignated A-8 upon the completion of testing.

46 aircraft were ordered as A-8Bs, however the order was changed to the Model 60 A-12s before production began.

== Operational history ==
The A-8 created a sensation in US aviation circles when it went into service with the 3rd Attack Group at Fort Crockett, Texas in April 1932. All other standard aircraft were of biplane configuration, and the first monoplane fighter (the Boeing P-26A) did not become operational until eight months later.

== Variants ==
XA-8
Model 59, one prototype, (30-387), length 32 ft 6 in (9.91 m), wingspan 44 ft (13 m), gross weight 5,413 lb (2,455 kg) Curtiss V-1570-23 direct drive engine

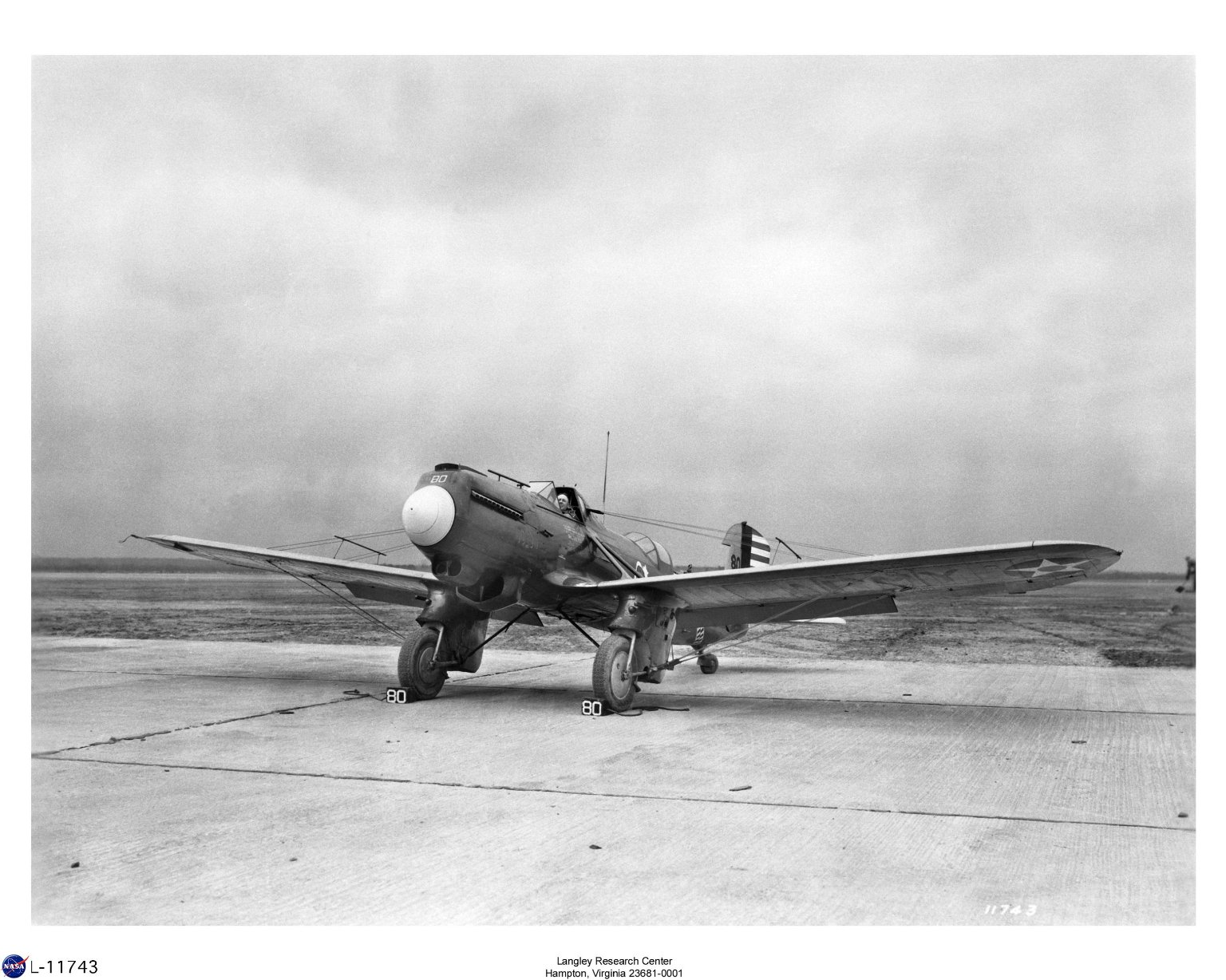
Curtiss YA-8 Shrike

YA-8
Model 59A, service test aircraft, 5 built, (32-344 to 32-348), gross weight 5,706 lb (2,588 kg), one was reworked as the YA-10 prototype with the 625 hp (466 kW) Pratt & Whitney Hornet radial engine
Y1A-8
service test aircraft, 8 built, (32-349 to 32-356) gross weight 5,710 lb (2,590 kg)
A-8
12 redesignated YA-8 and Y1A-8 aircraft
Y1A-8A
last Y1A-8 with Curtiss V-1570-57 geared engine, length 3 ft 7 in (1.09 m), gross weight 6,287 lb (2,852 kg)
A-8A
redesignated Y1A-8A aircraft
A-8B
cancelled, replaced by A-12 Shrike

== Operators ==
United States

- United States Army Air Corps

== Specifications (YA-8) ==
Data from Curtiss Aircraft 1907–1947

General characteristics

- Crew: 2
- Length: 32 ft 0 in (9.75 m)
- Wingspan: 44 ft 0 in (13.41 m)
- Height: 9 ft 0 in (2.74 m)
- Wing area: 256 sq ft (23.8 m^{2})
- Empty weight: 3,910 lb (1,774 kg)
- Gross weight: 5,888 lb (2,671 kg)
- Powerplant: 1 × Curtiss V-1570-31 Conqueror V-12 liquid-cooled piston engine, 600 hp (450 kW)
- Propellers: 3-bladed fixed-pitch propeller

Performance

- Maximum speed: 183 mph (295 km/h, 159 kn)
- Cruise speed: 153 mph (246 km/h, 133 kn)
- Range: 480 mi (770 km, 420 nmi)
- Service ceiling: 18,100 ft (5,500 m)
- Rate of climb: 1,325 ft/min (6.73 m/s)

Armament

- Guns:

- 4 × forward-firing 0.30 in (7.62 mm) M1919 Browning machine guns mounted in the wheel fairings
- 1 × 0.30 in (7.62 mm) machine gun mounted in the observer's cockpit for rear defense

- Bombs: Up to 4 × 122 lb (55 kg) bombs carried under the wings or up to 10 × 30 lb (14 kg) fragmentation bombs in fuselage chutes either side of the main fuel tank

== See also ==
Related development

- YA-10 Shrike
- A-12 Shrike

Aircraft of comparable role, configuration, and era

- Fokker XA-7

Related lists

- List of military aircraft of the United States
