= Strike (surname) =

Strike is a surname. Notable people with the surname include:

- Alice Strike (1896–2004), last surviving female Canadian military World War I veteran
- Anne Wafula Strike (born 1969), British wheelchair racer
- Cormoran Strike, a fictional detective in the novels of 'Robert Galbraith' (J. K. Rowling)
- Fred Strike (1880–1967), Canadian ice hockey player
- Hilda Strike (1910–1989), Canadian track athlete
- John Strike, baseball player
- Johnny Strike (1948–2018), American writer
- Sam Strike (born 1994), English actor
- Sheila Strike (born 1954), Canadian basketball player
- Sylvaine Strike, South African actress, writer and theatre director
- Tod Strike, Australian actor
