= Curtiss YA-10 Shrike =

American attack aircraft prototype

YA-10 Shrike
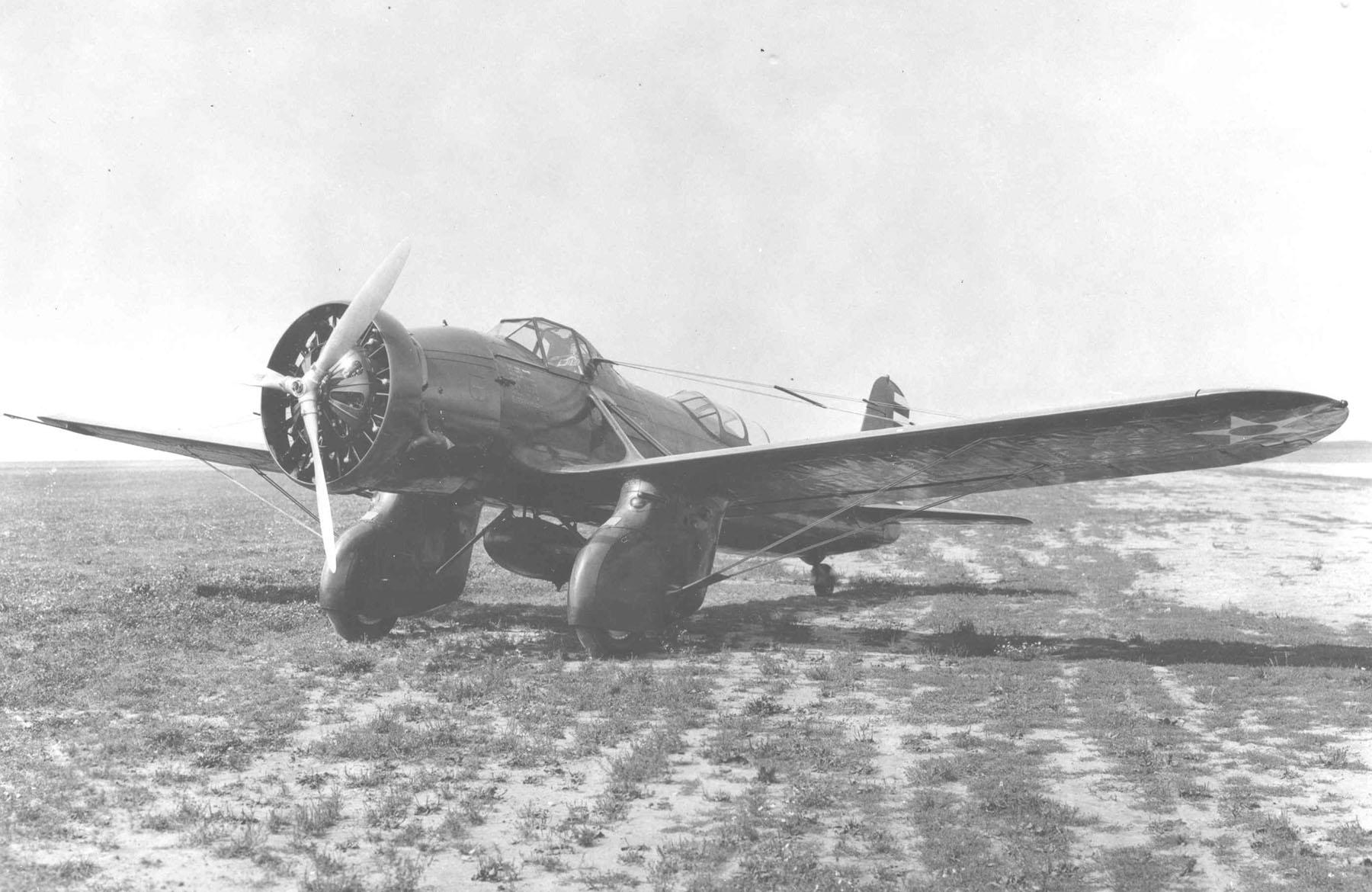

General information
- Type: Ground attack
- Manufacturer: Curtiss/Curtiss-Wright
- Primary users: United States Army Air Corps United States Navy
- Number built: 2

History
- Introduction date: 1933
- First flight: 1932
- Retired: 1939
- Developed from: A-8 Shrike
- Developed into: A-12 Shrike

The Curtiss YA-10 Shrike (Model 59B) was a 1930s United States test and development version of the A-8 Shrike ground-attack aircraft using various radial engines in place of the inline engine.

== Development ==
The Curtiss YA-10 Shrike was the first YA-8 fitted with a Pratt & Whitney R-1690-9 (R-1690D) Hornet radial engine. The conversion was carried out in September 1932, and it was found that the aircraft's performance was not degraded by the change of engine, and low-level maneuverability was improved due to the lower mass moment of inertia with the short radial engine. The USAAC preferred radials to inline engines for the ground attack role, due to the vulnerability of the latter's cooling system to anti-aircraft fire. The US Navy also preferred radials for carrier-borne operations. Upon completion of testing the Army changed an order for 46 A-8B aircraft to the production version of the YA-10, the A-12 Shrike.

== Operational history ==
Following completion of testing, the YA-10 was assigned to the 3rd Attack Group for operational service, then in 1934 it was assigned to the Command and General Staff School. The YA-10 was scrapped in early 1939.

The XS2C-1 was the Navy's first two-seat warplane. Since it was not equipped for carrier operations, it remained a prototype.

== Variants ==
YA-10
Model 59B, one U.S. Army Air Corps prototype
XS2C-1
Model 69, one U.S. Navy prototype with a 625 hp (466 kW) Wright R-1510-28 Whirlwind engine, delivered December 1932

== Operators ==
United States

- United States Army Air Corps

== Specifications (YA-10) ==
Data from Aerofiles : Curtiss, Curtiss Aircraft 1907–1947

General characteristics

- Crew: 2
- Length: 32 ft 0 in (9.75 m)
- Gross weight: 6,135 lb (2,783 kg)
- Powerplant: 1 × Pratt & Whitney R-1690D Hornet 9-cylinder air-cooled radial piston engine, 625 hp (466 kW)
- Propellers: 3-bladed variable-pitch propeller

Performance

- Maximum speed: 175 mph (282 km/h, 152 kn)
- Cruise speed: 148 mph (238 km/h, 129 kn)
- Stall speed: 67 mph (108 km/h, 58 kn)

Armament

- Guns: 4 × fixed forward-firing 0.30 in (7.62 mm) machine-gun, with another in the rear cockpit on a flexible mount
- Bombs: 10 × 30 lb (14 kg) bombs or 4 × 122 lb (55 kg) bombs

== See also ==
Related development

- Curtiss A-8

Aircraft of comparable role, configuration, and era

- Hawker Osprey

Related lists

- List of military aircraft of the United States
