= Gold Strike Canyon-Sugarloaf Mountain Traditional Cultural Property =

- U.S. National Register of Historic Places
- U.S. Historic district
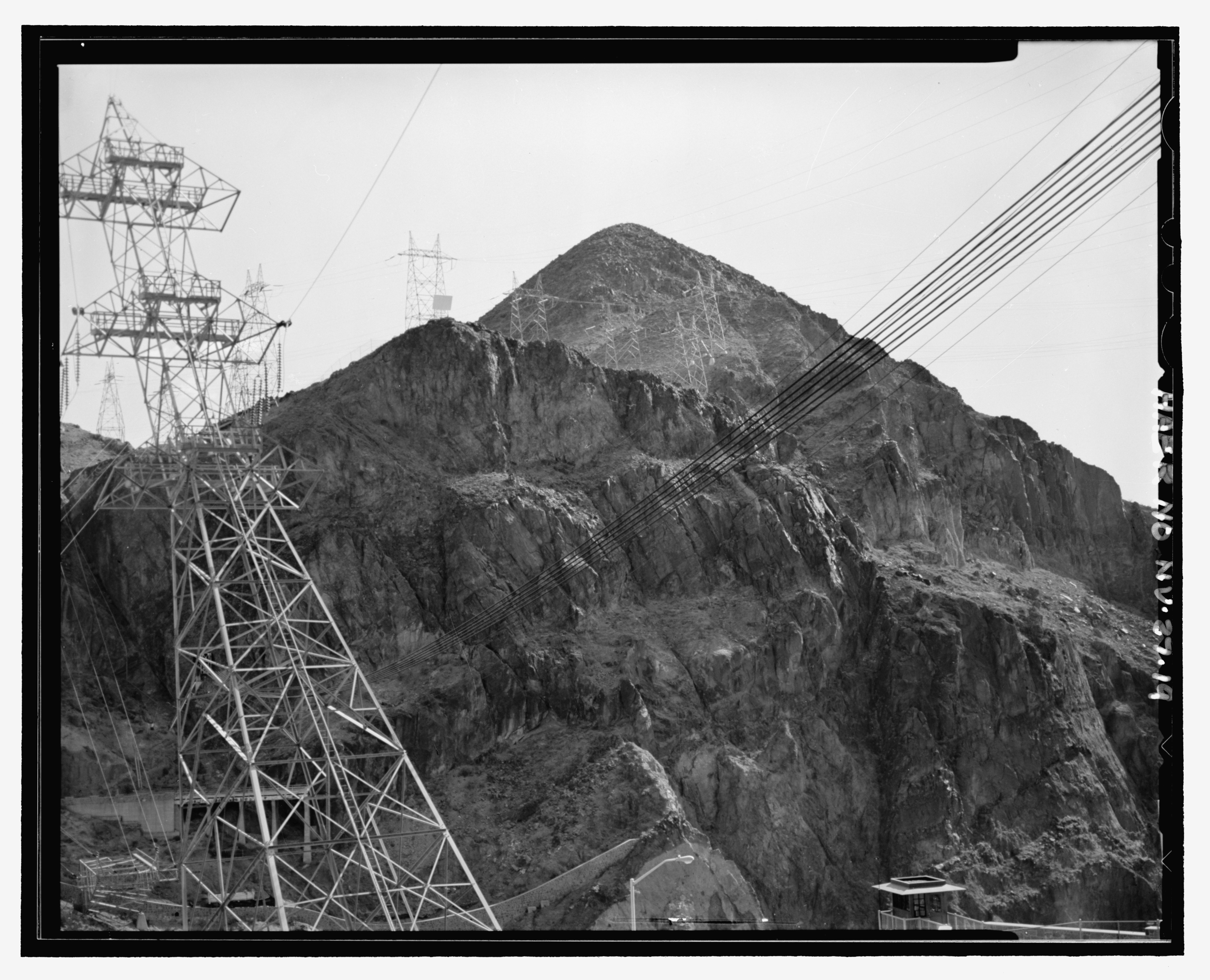
- View of Sugarloaf Mountain
- Location: Address Restricted
- Nearest city: Boulder City, Nevada
- NRHP reference No.: 04000935
- Added to NRHP: September 4, 2004

Gold Strike Canyon-Sugarloaf Mountain Traditional Cultural Property is listed on the National Register of Historic Places in Boulder City, Nevada.

== History ==
The TCP consists of approximately 676 acres of land encompassing two sites, Gold Strike Canyon and Sugarloaf Mountain, that have been significant to the traditional cultural beliefs of the Mojave, Southern Paiute, Hualapai, and most likely other tribes for thousands of years. The site is on land administered by the Bureau of Reclamation and the National Park Service.
