= Fokker XA-7 =

American attack aircraft prototype

XA-7
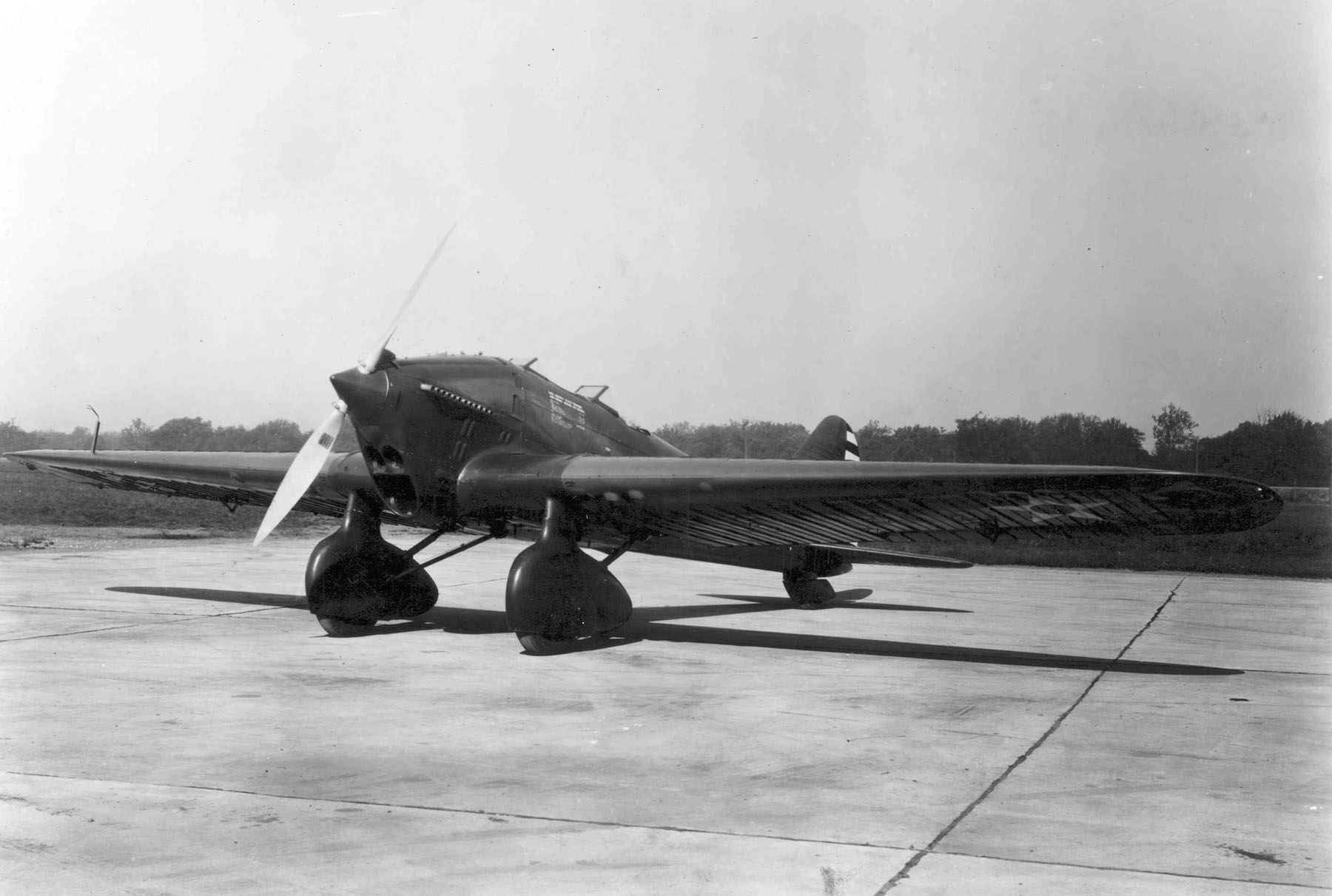
- Atlantic-Fokker XA-7

General information
- Type: Attack
- Manufacturer: Fokker-America
- Status: Prototype
- Primary user: United States Army Air Corps
- Number built: 1

History
- First flight: April 1931

The Fokker XA-7 was a United States prototype attack aircraft ordered in December 1929, and first flown in January 1931 by Fokker and then General Aviation Corporation after it bought Fokker-America in 1930, and entered in a competition held by the United States Army. However, the Curtiss A-8 won the competition, and A-7 development was not continued.

== Design and development ==
The XA-7 was a two-seat low-wing all-metal monoplane design. It featured a thick cantilever wing, tunnel radiator and two closely spaced open cockpits.

Despite some innovative features, the XA-7 did not proceed past flight test status. After testing, the sole prototype was scrapped.

== Specifications (Fokker XA-7) ==
Data from American attack aircraft since 1926, NMAF : ATLANTIC-FOKKER XA-7, General Aviation (Fokker) XA-7

General characteristics

- Crew: 2
- Length: 31 ft 0 in (9.45 m)
- Wingspan: 46 ft 9 in (14.25 m)
- Height: 9 ft 5 in (2.87 m)
- Wing area: 333 sq ft (30.9 m^{2})
- Empty weight: 3,866 lb (1,754 kg)
- Gross weight: 5,650 lb (2,563 kg)
- Powerplant: 1 × Curtiss V-1570-27 Conqueror V-12 liquid-cooled piston engine, 600 hp (450 kW)
- Propellers: 2-bladed Hamilton Standard fixed-pitch propeller

Performance

- Maximum speed: 184 mph (296 km/h, 160 kn) at sea level
- Landing speed: 61 mph (53 kn; 98 km/h)
- Range: 500 mi (800 km, 430 nmi)
- Service ceiling: 19,000 ft (5,800 m)

Armament

- Guns: 4x 0.30 in (7.62 mm) fixed forward firing machine-guns + 1x flexibly mounted 0.30 in (7.62 mm) machine-gun in the rear cockpit
- Bombs: 488 lb (221 kg) of bombs on external racks

== See also ==
Aircraft of comparable role, configuration, and era

- Curtiss XA-8

Related lists

- List of military aircraft of the United States
