= 1919 United States Army Air Service aircraft designation system =

Aircraft designation system used by the United States Army Air Service

1919 United States Army Air Service aircraft designation system, despite not being named that way initially, or Specifications for military aircraft or Aircraft classification was a first attempt of U.S. Army to standardize the role-based requirements for designs needed for creation of aircraft which meet all military requirements up to date of ever being used. The intent was to avoid future shock U.S. felt for years after WWI. The design requirements started slowly clarifying what exactly they have to build having no types to be based on.

Initially the nine proposed roles (types) of aircraft for its designs' development was later raised to fifteen and, first, two (further later) of miscellaneous/specials unofficially called in common as Type XVI

== History ==
From 1919 until 1924, the United States Army Air Service used a system to designate the types of aircraft it was operating, based on role and specific characteristics of the aircraft. When first instituted, Roman numerals were used to number the designations in use. These numerals were only applied to the first fifteen types before being abandoned. Air-cooled and Water-cooled refer to the engines installed, while Pursuit was the name given to fighter aircraft in the US Army, at that time. The system was replaced by the 1924 United States Army Air Service aircraft designation system.

== Specifications ==
List of design specifications provided was based on the World War I experience of both allies and US. Next one was proposed to unify the US army related military planes:

Type	Type designating letters	Type of Aircraft	Dates in use	Examples	Minimum requirements
I	PW	Single-seat, Water-cooled, Day Pursuit	1921-1928	Engineering Division PW-1, Loening PW-2, Loening PW-2A, Loening PW-2B, Orenco PW-3, Gallaudet PW-4, Orenco D-2, Thomas-Morse MB-3, Boeing MB-3A	145 mph 2,5 h flight @ 15k-foot altitude + 0,5 h at ground level with 525 pounds of useful load, and, fixed, one .30-caliber and one .50-caliber machine gun, climb 20k feet in 21 mins, ceiling @23750 feet
II	PN	Single-seat, Air-cooled or Water-cooled, Night Pursuit	1921	Curtiss PN-1	127 mph @10kfoot alt, climb @15k feet in 20 minutes, ceiling @21000 feet, 2,5(@15kfeet)+0,5h(ground) flight, useful load of 554 pounds, fixed two .30 caliber machine guns
III	PA	Single-seat, radial or rotary Air-cooled, Day Pursuit	1922	Loening PA-1, Nieuport-27, Nieuport-28	135 mph 2,5 h flight @ 15k-foot altitude + 0,5 h at ground level with 532 pounds of useful load, and, fixed, one .30-caliber and one .50-caliber machine gun, climb from 15k to 24k feet in 30 mins, ceiling @25000 feet
IV	PG	Armored single-seat, air-cooled or water-cooled, Pursuit Ground Attack	1922	Engineering Division PG-1, Fokker V-40/400 h.p. "Liberty" cantilever monoplane with welded steel fuselage and veneer wings. The armour is removable., Aeromarine PG-1	125 mph 1,5 h flight @ ground level altitude with fixed level are required. The offensive armament consists of one .50-caliber or one 11 M/M machine gun and one 37 M/M cannon. The crew, power plant, and fuel tanks are completely armored
V	TP	Two-seat, Air-cooled or Water-cooled, Day Pursuit	1922	Engineering Division TP-1, Le Pere biplane	unsupercharged engine:130 mph 2,5 h flight @ 15k-foot altitude + 0,5 h at ground level with 944 pounds of useful load, climb 20k feet in 30 mins, ceiling @22000 feet/supercharged engine: 145 mph @ alts between 17k and 31k feet, climb 20k in 21mins and 25k in 28 mins and 30k in 37 mins, ceiling 34000 feet, 2h @20k feet alt + 0,5 h at ground level// both equipped to take a 300-bomb load and, fixed, one 30-caliber and one 50-caliber fixed machine gun, two .30-caliber flexible machine guns, and one .30-caliber flexible floor machine gun.
VI	GA	Three-seat, Armored Ground Attack	1920-1922	Engineering Division GA-1, Boeing GA-1, Boeing GA-2	
VII	IL	Infantry Liaison	1919	Orenco IL-1	
VIII	NO	Night Observation	1925	Douglas XNO-1	
IX	AO	Artillery Observation	1924	Atlantic AO-1	
X	CO	Corps Observation	1922-1924	Dayton-Wright DH-4B, Dayton-Wright DH-4B1, Engineering Division CO-1, Engineering Division CO-2, Engineering Division XB-1A, Dayton-Wright DH-4BW, Dayton-Wright DH-4B	
XI	DB	Day Bombardment	1920-1923	Gallaudet DB-1, Gallaudet DB-1B, Engineering Division USD-9A, Airco DH-9	
XII	NBS	Night Bombardment, Short Distance	1921-1924	Martin MB-2, Martin NBS-1, Curtiss NBS-1, L-W-F NBS-1, Aeromarine NBS-1	
XIII	NBL	Night Bombardment, Long Distance	1923	Witteman-Lewis XNBL-1, Barling NBL-1	
XIV	TA	Trainer, Air-cooled	1921-1924	Elias TA-1, Huff-Daland TA-2, Dayton-Wright TA-3, Huff-Daland TA-3, Engineering Division TA-4, Huff-Daland TA-5, Thomas-Morse S-4-C, Huff-Daland TA-6, Fokker TA-1, Fokker TA-2, Fokker TA-3	
XV	TW	Trainer, Water-cooled	1920-1923	Curtiss JN-4D, Curtiss JN-4H, Cox-Klemin TA-2, Engineering Division TW-1, Cox-Klemin TW-2, Dayton-Wright TW-3, Dayton-Wright TA-5	

=== Special ===
Another ones to be unified as non-military ones was proposed and implemented gradually, as needed:

Type	Type designating letters	Type of Aircraft	Initiated	Dates in use	Examples	Minimum requirements
n/a	A	Ambulance	>1923	1919-1925	Cox-Klemin XA-1, Fokker A-2	
n/a	G	Glider	>1923	1922	Engineering Division G-1, Engineering Division G-2	
special	M	Single-seat, Air-cooled, Messenger		1919-1921	Engineering Division Messenger airplane, Verville-Sperry M-1 Messenger	
special	PS	Single-seat, Air-cooled or Water-cooled, Alert (defending service airdromes from hostile air attack)		1923	Dayton-Wright XPS-1, Dayton-Wright PS-1	
n/a	R	Racer	>1923	1921-1923	Verville-Packard R-1, Thomas-Morse R-2, Verville-Sperry R-3, Loening R-4, Thomas-Morse R-5, Curtiss R-6, Curtiss R-8	
n/a	S	Seaplane	>1923	1921-1924	Loening S-1	
n/a	T	Transport	>1923	1919-1923	Martin T-1, Fokker T-2, Lowe-Willard-Fowler T-3	
