= LWF model V =

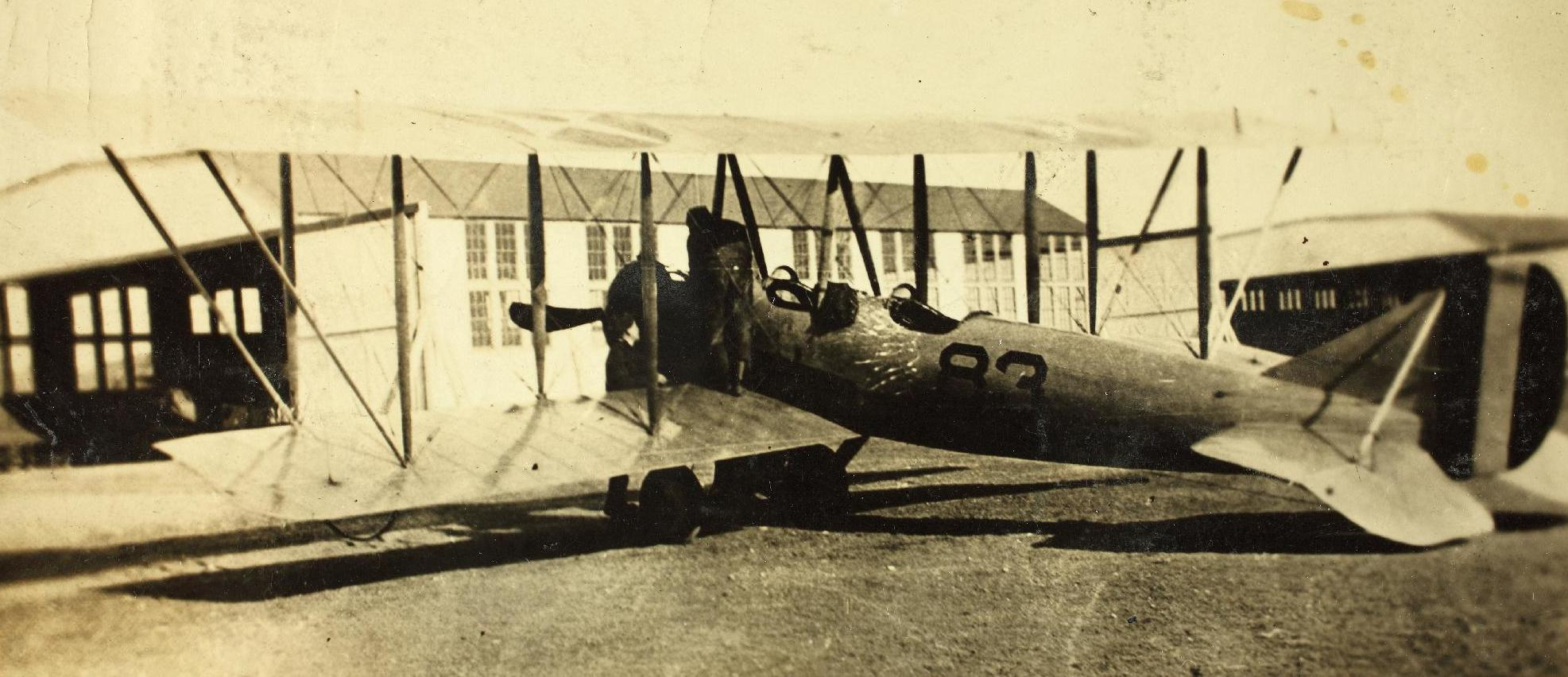

General information
- Type: trainer/reconnaissance
- National origin: United States
- Manufacturer: Lowe, Willard & Fowler Engineering Company
- Designer: Chas. F. Willard
- Status: retired
- Primary user: Aviation Section, U.S. Signal Corps
- Number built: 130, including model F

The LWF model V (Note: Sources vary on how LWF is to be rendered (LWF vs L.W.F. vs L-W-F), however while some of their published material used hyphens or periods, their logos used only letters. While no earlier LWF aircraft are known, later designs switched to letters, with the V being followed by the model F, G and H, and as E is the fifth letter, it was likely the roman numeral V rather than the letter V.) is an American two-seat reconnaissance and training biplane built during World War One, and used for a short period afterwards. A variant specially built to test the Liberty L-12 aircraft engine, the model F, was the first aircraft to fly powered by that widely used engine.

== Design and development ==
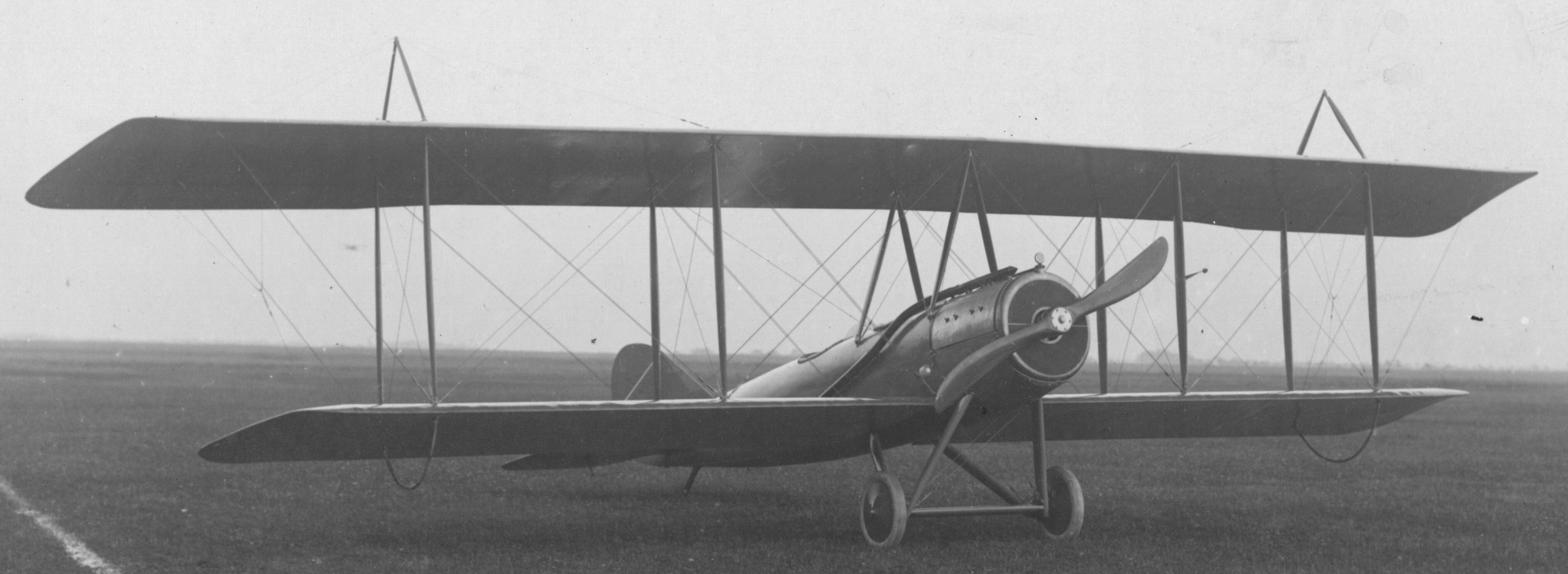
LWF model V as initially built, with kingposts supporting outer wings, which were later replaced with struts braced to the lower wing

The model V's most notable feature was its wooden monocoque fuselage, built up of three layers of wooden strips with layers of silk between them. One layer was run fore and aft, while the other two were perpendicular to each other, running in a corkscrew spiral around the fuselage.

The two-bay biplane wings had ailerons on the top wing only, and the span of the upper wing was greater than that of the lower wing, with the extra length braced with the aid of kingposts and wires above the top wing on early examples, and additional struts angled outwards, affixed to the lower wing on later examples. All but the earliest Thomas-powered examples and the model F also had the wings swept back.

The engine was mounted behind an oval car-type frontal radiator, and enclosed in metal panels that streamlined the forward fuselage, although the later versions dispensed with some of the fairing panels.

Both undercarriage and empennage were conventional for the period, with fore and aft vees connected laterally with the axle and a spreader bar.

== Operational history ==
A modified variant of the V, the F, was the first aircraft to fly with the new Liberty L-12 engine that would find widespread use in the latter part of World War One. The model F in turn led to the "Reconnaissance", an intended production variant of the F, which in turn evolved into the LWF model G, although none of these would see large scale production.

The model V was primarily relegated to training as its performance was not competitive when compared to available French and British military reconnaissance aircraft. As a result, a large number were available when the Czech legions supporting the White Russian (Tsarist) contingent were seeking military aircraft, however by then they were in very poor shape, and only a small number of the 28 that were shipped were even flyable, and even those were found to be of little use, but desperation forced the Czechs to use them for reconnaissance. The sole surviving example was from this contingent.

After the war, LWF attempted to interest the United States Post Office in them as mailplanes, however the sole example doesn't appear to have ever carried the mail, and no orders were forthcoming.

A small number were fitted with floats, with one example being used by the Michigan State Militia until it was overturned in a storm. It does not appear to have been repaired afterwards.

== Variants ==
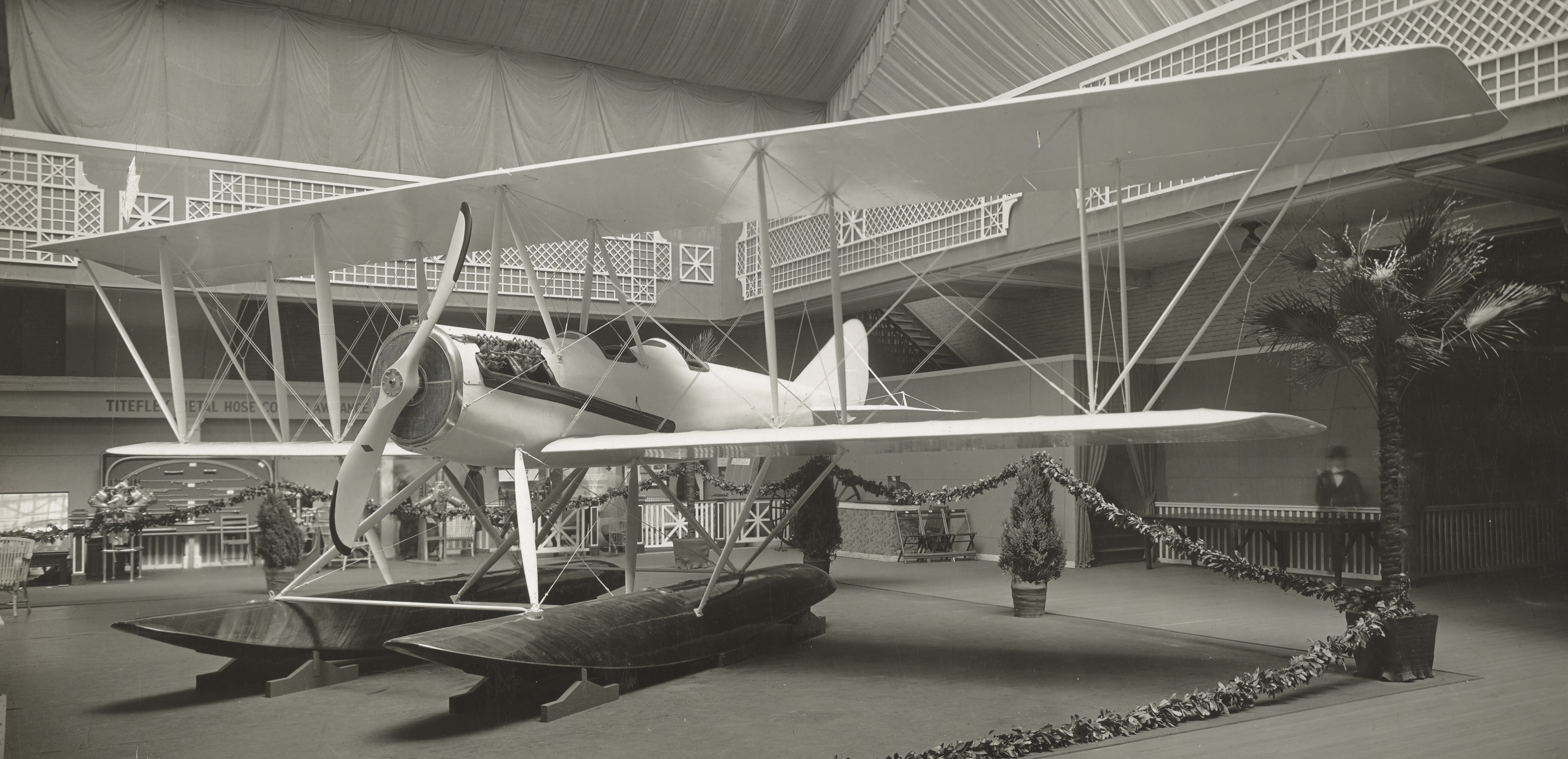
LWF VH-1 Seagull

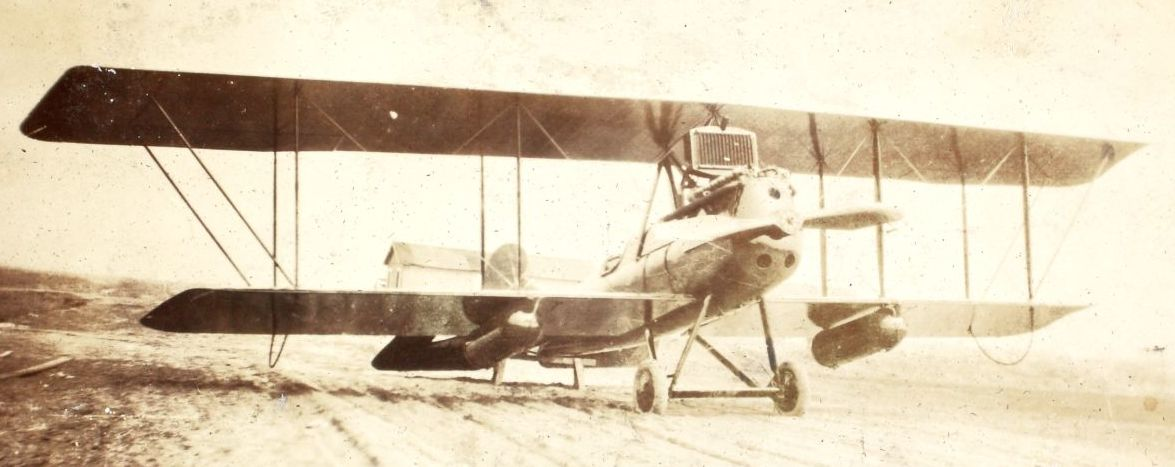
LWF model V modified as mailplane

info from www.aerofiles.com (2008)

V
135 hp (101 kW) Thomas engine
V-1
140 hp (100 kW) Sturtevant engine
VH-1 Seagull
floatplane variant
V-2
165 hp (123 kW) Hall-Scott engine
V-3
200 hp (150 kW) Sturtevant engine
F
modified V-2 variant built to test 400 hp (300 kW) Liberty L-12 engine, one built.
F-7 Reconnaissance
production variant of model F, one or two built.
Mailplane
extensively modified for the United States Postal Service, one built.

== Operators ==
info from www.aerofiles.com (2008)

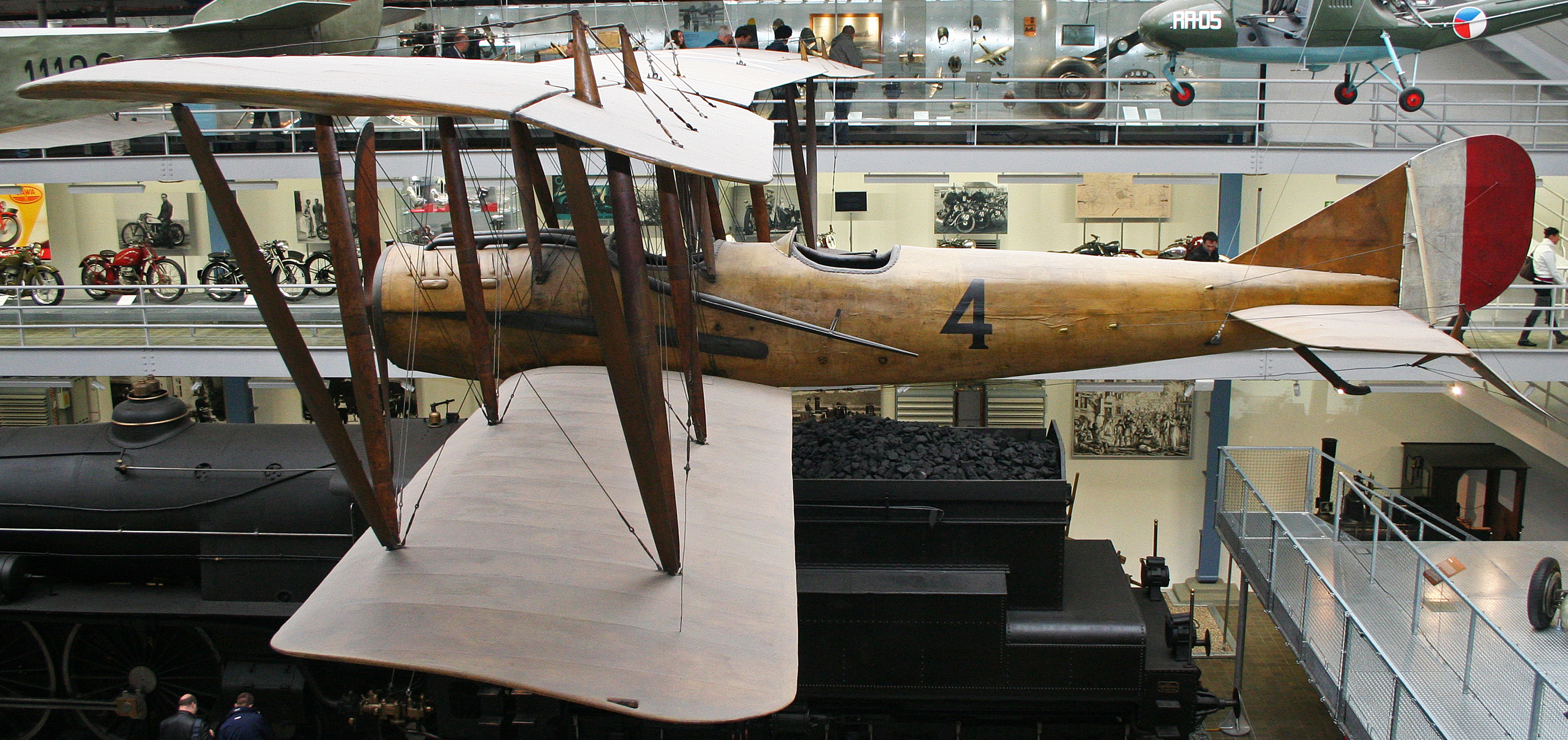
LWF model V survivor on display in Prague

Czechoslovakia

- Czechoslovak Air Force – bought 28 well worn second-hand examples from the USAAS.

Soviet Union

- Soviet Air Forces – captured a small number of examples from the retreating Czechoslovaks

United States

- United States Army Air Service – purchased 135 examples
- United States Post Office – tested one example
- Michigan State Militia – operated a VH-1 until damaged in a storm

== Survivors and aircraft on display ==
The sole surviving example of an LWF model V is made up from parts from several surviving examples that had been used by the Czech legions, and is on display at the Národní technické muzeum in Prague, where it is suspended from the ceiling, marked as number 4.

== Specifications (model V-1) ==
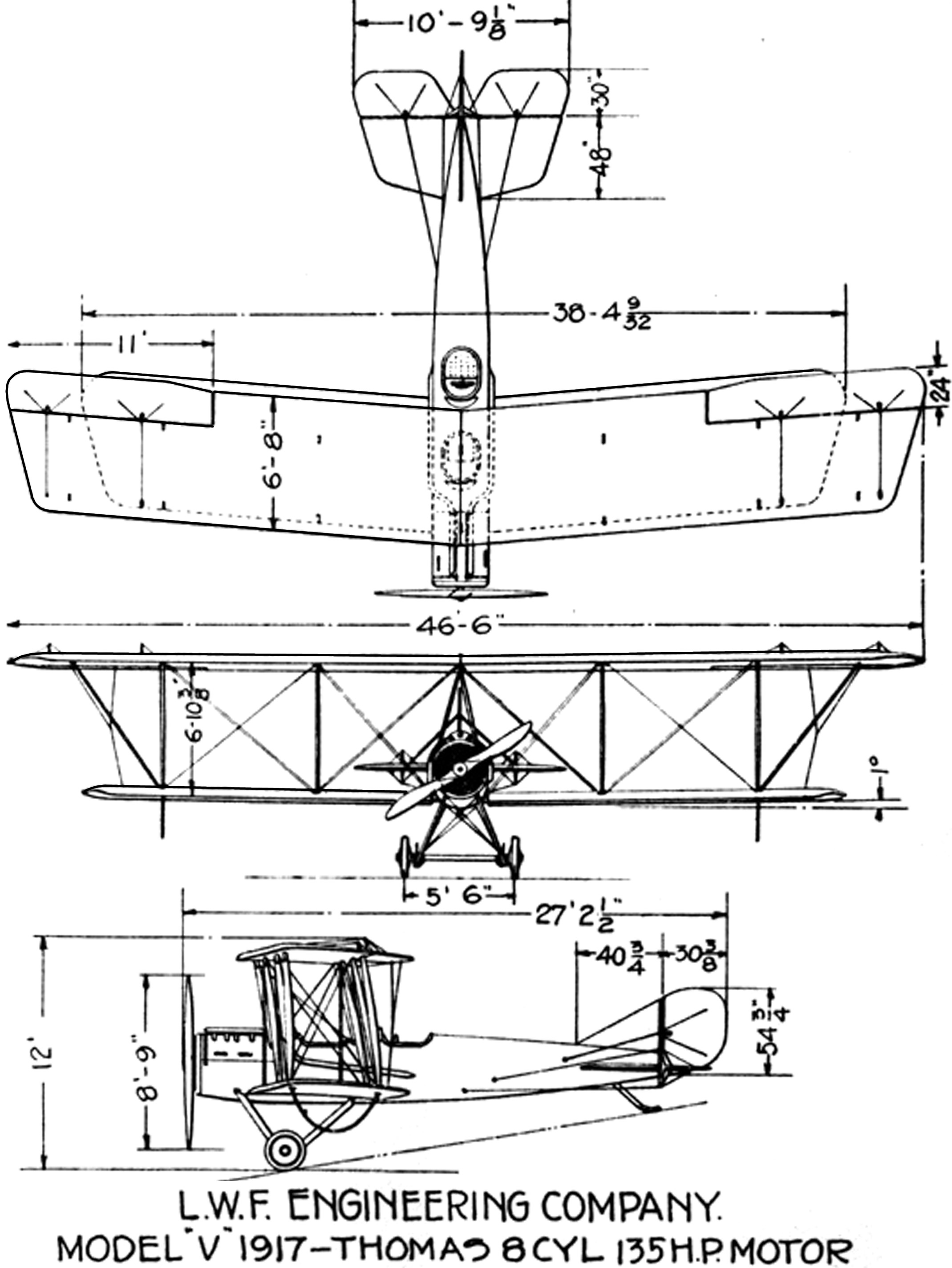
LWF model V 3-view drawing

Data from Flight magazine

General characteristics

- Crew: Two
- Length: 27 ft 0 in (8.23 m)
- Upper wingspan: 46 ft 6 in (14.17 m)
- Wing chord upper: 80 in (2.0 m)
- Lower wingspan: 38 ft 8 in (11.79 m)
- Wing chord lower: 80 in (2.0 m)
- Height: 11 ft 4 in (3.45 m)
- Wing area: 490 sq ft (46 m^{2})
- Airfoil: L.W.F No. 1
- Empty weight: 2,134 lb (968 kg)
- Gross weight: 3,129 lb (1,419 kg)
- Fuel capacity: 81 US gal (310 L; 67 imp gal)
- Oil capacity: 8 US gal (30 L; 6.7 imp gal)
- Undercarriage track: 5 ft 6 in (1.68 m)
- Powerplant: 1 × Sturtevant model 5 liquid cooled V-8, 140 hp (100 kW)

Performance

- Maximum speed: 95 mph (153 km/h, 83 kn)
- Cruise speed: 81 mph (130 km/h, 70 kn)
- Minimum control speed: 42 mph (68 km/h, 36 kn)
- Endurance: 4 hours
- Service ceiling: 15,500 ft (4,700 m)
- Time to altitude: 10 mins to 3,800 ft (1,200 m)
