= L-W-F NBS-2 =

General information
- Type: Biplane night bomber
- National origin: United States
- Manufacturer: L-W-F Engineering Company
- Primary user: United States Army Air Corps
- Number built: 0

History
- Developed from: LWF Model H Owl

The L-W-F XNBS-2 was a planned 1920s biplane night bomber designed by the Lowe, Willard & Fowler Engineering Company for the United States Army Air Service.

== Development ==
The L-W-F XNBS-2 was a scaled-down version of the L-W-F Model H Owl mailplane. Two XNBS-2 prototypes were ordered in 1923 but the project was cancelled before construction started.

== Specifications ==
Data from National Museum of the United States Air Force

General characteristics

- Length: 46 ft 5 in (14.15 m)
- Wingspan: 90 ft (27 m)
- Gross weight: 14,000 lb (6,350 kg)
- Powerplant: 2 × Liberty L-12A supercharged V-12 water-cooled piston engines, 420 hp (310 kW) each
