= Ernest Harmon =

Ernest Harmon may refer to:

- Ernest N. Harmon (1894–1979), United States Army general
- Ernest Emery Harmon (1893–1933), American aviation pioneer
