= 1924 United States Army Air Service aircraft designation system =

American military designation scheme

In 1924, problems with the previous designation system led to a general revamping of the designation system used by the United States Army Air Service. This system was to remain in effect with the U.S. Army Air Corps, the U.S. Army Air Forces and the independent U.S. Air Force, as well as those aircraft remaining in the U.S. Army after 1947. With some minor changes it became the basis of the 1962 United States Tri-Service aircraft designation system.

== 1924–1962 Designation System ==
The designation given to a particular aircraft can be broken down to provide information about that specific aircraft. A hypothetical example shows a typical designation, and what each section is. Tables below indicate possible codes used for each section, what their meanings were, and the time period in which they were used – not all codes were in use at the same time, and some codes, such as P for pursuit were changed to F for fighter for a given aircraft while they were in service, so that the Lockheed P-80 was redesignated as the Lockheed F-80. The portion of the designation after the subtype may be omitted in normal use. The hyphen before the block number may be replaced with the word "block", and in some cases the block number may be omitted. This information, along with the name of the service (USAAC, USAAF, USAF), the base (if permanently assigned) and the serial number was painted on the forward fuselage side under the cockpit.

| Status | Mission-Modifier | Mission- | Model | Subtype | -Block Number | -Production Facility Code |
|---|---|---|---|---|---|---|
| X | W | B- | 29 | A | -10 or Block 10 | -BO |

=== Status Prefix ===
(generally applied only to specific aircraft)

| Code | Meaning | Period |
|---|---|---|
| E | Exempt from modification orders (loaned to outside organizations) | 1946–1955 |
| G | Grounded permanently (for groundcrew instruction) | 1924–1962 |
| J | Temporarily modified for Special Tests (e.g. NACA) | 1956–1962 |
| N | Permanently modified for Special Tests (e.g. NACA) | 1956–1962 |
| R | Restricted (e.g. no aerobatics, no passengers or similar) | 1943–1947 |
| X | Experimental pre-production development aircraft | 1925–1962 |
| Y | Service test pending production orders | 1928–1962 |
| Y1 | Funding from outside normal fiscal year procurement | 1931–1936 |
| Z | Obsolete - limits maintenance and repairs | 1928–1962 |

=== Mission Modifier prefix ===
Used when an aircraft has been modified for a different role from originally designed.

| Code | Meaning | Period |
|---|---|---|
| C | Cargo Transport | 1943–1962 |
| D | Director (Drone Controller) | 1948–1962 |
| F | Photographic | 1945–1947 |
| G | Carrier (parasite aircraft mothership) | 1948 |
| K | Ferret (electronic intelligence) | 1944–1947 |
| K | Tanker | 1949–1962 |
| M | Medical | 1951–1952 |
| P | Passenger Transport (Only) | 1948–1962 |
| Q | Radio Controlled Drone | 1948–1962 |
| R | Reconnaissance (Photographic) | 1948–1962 |
| S | Search and Rescue | 1948–1962 |
| T | Trainer | 1943–1962 |
| U | Utility (light transport) | 1943–1962 |
| V | VIP Transport | 1945–1962 |
| W | Weather | 1948–1962 |

=== Mission Letter ===
| Code | Meaning | Period |
|---|---|---|
| A | Aerial Target | 1940–1941 |
| A | Amphibian | 1948–1962 |
| A | Attack | 1924–1947 |
| AG | Assault Glider | 1942–1944 |
| AT | Advanced Trainer | 1925–1947 |
| B | Bomber | 1925–1962 |
| BC | Basic Combat | 1936–1940 |
| BG | Bomb Glider | 1942–1944 |
| BLR | Bomber, Long Range | 1935–1936 |
| BQ | Bomb, Controllable (glide bombs & cruise missiles) | 1942–1945 |
| BT | Basic Trainer | 1930–1947 |
| C | Cargo | 1925–1962 |
| CG | Cargo Glider | 1941–1947 |
| CQ | Target Control | 1942–1947 |
| F | Fighter | 1948–1962 |
| F | Photographic | 1930–1947 |
| FG | Fuel Glider | 1930–1947 |
| FM | Fighter, Multiplace | 1936–1941 |
| G | Glider | 1948–1962 |
| G | Gyroplane | 1935–1939 |
| GB | Glide Bomb | 1942–1947 |
| GT | Glide Torpedo | 1942–1947 |
| H | Helicopter | 1948–1962 |
| HB | Heavy Bomber | 1925–1927 |
| JB | Jet-Propelled Bomb | 1943–1947 |
| L | Liaison | 1942–1962 |
| LB | Light Bomber | 1924–1932 |
| O | Observation | 1924–1942 |
| OA | Observation Amphibian | 1925–1947 |
| OQ | Aerial Target (Model Airplane) | 1942–1947 |
| P | Pursuit | 1925–1947 |
| PB | Pursuit, Biplace | 1935–1941 |
| PG | Powered Glider | 1943–1947 |
| PQ | Aerial Target (Man Carrying) | 1942–1947 |
| PT | Primary Trainer | 1925–1947 |
| Q | Aerial Target | 1948–1962 |
| R | Reconnaissance | 1948–1962 |
| R | Rotary Wing | 1941–1947 |
| S | Supersonic/Special Test | 1946–1947 |
| T | Trainer | 1948–1962 |
| TG | Training Glider | 1941–1947 |
| U | Utility | 1952–1962 |
| V | VTOL or STOL | 1954–1962 |
| X | Special Research | 1948–1962 |

=== Model Number ===
In theory each new design in a specific Mission category is numbered in sequence starting at 1, so that succeeding designs are numbered 2,3,4 etc. however numbers were occasionally skipped.

=== Sub-type ===
Minor modifications to a basic design are usually given a sequentially assigned letter denoting the particular subtype, starting with A and continuing with B, C, D, etc. In general, no additional meaning can be deduced from the sub-type letter.

=== Block Number ===
Analogous to the order number, these help not just to identify when an airframe was built, but in some types distinguish changes that occurred during production not identified by the sub-type letter, as between the Republic P-47 Thunderbolt razorback variant and the bubble canopy variant. Block numbers are unique to each type of aircraft.

=== Production facility code ===
Each factory producing aircraft for the USAAF was assigned a two letter code to distinguish between the product of one facility from another. This was important because parts were not always interchangeable between different plants, and the aircraft may have required different modifications during service.

| Code | Manufacturer | Location |
|---|---|---|
| AD | Aero Design & Engineering Co. | Bethany, OK |
| AE | Aeronca | Middletown, OH |
| AG | Air Glider | Akron, OH |
| AH | American Helicopter | Manhattan Beach, CA |
| AV | Avro Canada | Montreal, QC, Canada |
| BA | Bell | Atlanta, GA |
| BB | Babcock Aircraft | DeLand, FL |
| BC | Bell Aerosystems | Buffalo, NY |
| BE | Bell | Buffalo, NT |
| BF | Bell | Fort Worth, TX |
| BH | Beech | Wichita, KS |
| BL | Bellanca | New Castle, DE |
| BN | Boeing | Renton, WA |
| BO | Boeing | Seattle, WA |
| BR | Briegleb Sailplane | Beverley Hills, CA |
| BS | Bowlus | San Francisco, CA |
| BU | Budd | Philadelphia, PA |
| BV | Boeing-Vertol | Morton, PA |
| BW | Boeing | Wichita, KS |
| CA | Chase Aircraft | West Trenton, NJ |
| CC | Canadian Commercial Corp. | Toronto, ON, Canada |
| CE | Cessna | Wichita, KS |
| CF | Convair/Consolidated-Vultee | Fort Worth, TX |
| CH | Christopher Aircraft | St. Louis, MO |
| CK | Curtiss-Wright | Louisville, KY |
| CL | Culver | Wichita, KS |
| CM | Commonwealth Aircraft | Kansas City, MO |
| CN | Chase Aircraft | Willow Run, MI |
| CO | Convair/Consolidated-Vultee | San Diego, CA |
| CR | Cornelius | Dayton, OH |
| CS | Curtiss-Wright | St. Louis, MO |
| CU | Curtiss-Wright | Buffalo, NY |
| CV | Chance Vought, Vought | Dallas, TX |
| DA | Doak Aircraft | Torrance, CA |
| DC | Douglas | Chicago, IL |
| DE | Douglas | El Segundo, CA |
| DH | De Havilland Canada | Toronto, ON, Canada |
| DJ | SNCA Sud-Ouest | Marignane, France |
| DK | Douglas | Oklahoma City, OK |
| DL | Douglas | Long Beach, CA |
| DM | Doman Helicopter | Danbury, CT |
| DO | Douglas | Santa Monica, CA |
| DT | Douglas | Tulsa, OK |
| FA | Fairchild | Hagerstown, MD |
| FB | Fairchild | Burlington, NC |
| FE | Fleet | Fort Erie, ON, Canada |
| FL | Fleetwings | Bristol, PA |
| FO | Ford | Willow Run, MI |
| FR | Frankfort | Joliet, IL |
| FS | Firestone | Los Angeles, CA |
| FT | Fletcher Aviation | Pasadena, CA |
| GA | G & A Aircraft | Willow Grove, PA |
| GC | General Motors (Fisher) | Cleveland, OH |
| GE | General Aircraft | Astoria, Long Island, NY |
| GF | Globe | Fort Worth, TX |
| GK | General Motors | Kansas City, KS |
| GM | General Motors (Fisher) | Detroit, MI |
| GN | Gibson Refrigerator | Greenville, MI |
| GO | Goodyear Aircraft | Akron, OH |
| GR | Grumman | Bethpage, Long Island, NY |
| GT | Grand Central Aircraft Eng. | Tucson, AZ |
| GY | Gyrodyne Co., of America | St. James, Long Island, NY |
| HE | Helio | Norwood, MA |
| HI | Higgins Aircraft | New Orleans, LA |
| HI | Hiller | Palo Alto, CA |
| HO | Howard Aircraft | Chicago, IL |
| HP | Handey Page | Radlett, Herts, UK |
| HS | Hawker Siddeley Aviation | Kingston, Surrey, UK |
| HU | Hughes Aircraft | Culver City & San Diego CA |
| IN | Interstate A. & Eng. | El Segundo, CA |
| KA | Kaman | Windsor Locks, CT |
| KE | Kellet | Philadelphia, PA |
| KM | Kaiser Manufacturing | Willow Run, MI |
| LK | Laister-Kauffman | St. Louis, MO |
| LM | Lockheed Aircraft | Marietta, GA |
| LO | Lockheed Aircraft | Burbank, CA |
| MA | Martin | Baltimore, MD |
| MC | McDonnell | St. Louis, MO |
| MD | Martin | Denver, CO |
| MF | Martin | Orlando, FL |
| MH | McCulloch Motors | Los Angeles, CA |
| MM | McDonnell | Memphis, TN |
| MO | Martin | Omaha, NE |
| NA | North American | Inglewood, CA |
| NC | North American | Kansas City, KS |
| ND | Noorduyn Aviation | Montreal, QC, Canada |
| NF | North American | Fresno, CA |
| NH | North American | Columbus, OH |
| NI | North American | Downey, CA |
| NK | Nash-Kelvinator | Detroit, MI |
| NO | Northrop | Hawthorne, CA |
| NT | North American | Dallas, TX |
| NW | Northwestern Aeronautical Co. | St. Paul, MN |
| OM | On Mark Engineering | Van Nuys, CA |
| PA | Piper | Lock Haven, PA |
| PH | Piasecki | Morton, PA |
| PI | Piper | Lockhaven, PA |
| PI | Piasecki | Philadelphia, PA |
| PL | Platt-LePage | Eddystone, PA |
| PR | Pratt, Read & Co. | Deep River, CT |
| RA | Republic | Evansville, IN |
| RD | Read-York | Kenosha, WI |
| RE | Republic | Farmingdale, Long Island, NY |
| RI | Ridgefield Mfg. | Ridgeville, NJ |
| RO | Robertson Aircraft | St. Louis, MO |
| RP | The Radioplane Co. | Van Nuys, CA |
| RY | Ryan Aeronautical | San Diego, CA |
| SA | Stroukoff | West Trenton, NJ |
| SE | Seibel Helicopter | Wichita, KS |
| SI | Sikorsky Aircraft | Stratford, CT |
| SL | St. Louis Aircraft | St. Louis, MO |
| SP | Spartan | Tulsa, OK |
| SW | Schweizer | Elmira, NY |
| TA | Taylorcraft | Alliance, OH |
| TE | Temco | Dallas, TX |
| TG | Texas Engineering & Manufacturing | Greenville, TX |
| TI | Timm | Van Nuys, CA |
| TP | Texas Engineering & Manufacturing | Grand Prairie, TX |
| UH | United Helicopter | Palto Alto, CA |
| UN | Universal Molded Products | Bristol, VA |
| VE | Vega Aircraft Corp. | Burbank, CA |
| VI | Canadian Vickers | Montreal, Canada |
| VL | Vertol Aircraft | Morton, PA |
| VN | Vultee | Nashville, TN |
| VO | Chance Vought | Dallas, TX |
| VU | Vultee | Downey, CA |
| VW | Vultee | Wayne, MI |
| WA | Ward Furniture Co. | Fort Smith, AR |
| WI | Wichita Engineering | Wichita Falls, TX |
| WO | Waco | Troy, OH |

=== Exceptions ===
Aircraft ordered by foreign governments but taken over by the US Government often used the manufacturer's internal designations rather than the designation used for similar aircraft ordered by the US Government, so that the Consolidated LB-30 was a B-24 ordered by the British but not delivered, and the Vultee V.77 was similarly an AT-19.

== See also ==
- Lists of military aircraft of the United States
- List of United States Air Force aircraft designations (1919–1962)

== Bibliography ==
=== Websites ===
- Andrew Chorney (2007). "U.S. Systems of Aircraft Designation".
- Derek Bridges (2005). "U.S. Military Aircraft Designation Systems". Archived from the original on 4 March 2016.
- Andreas Parsch (2023). "Current Designations of U.S. Military Aircraft".
- Randy Wilson (1997). "U. S. Army Aircraft Designations 1939-1945".

=== Books ===
- Fahey, James C. (1946). U.S. Army Aircraft (Heavier-Than-Air) 1908-1946. New York, N.Y., Ships and Aircraft.
- Swanborough, Gordon; Bowers, Peter M. United States Military Aircraft Since 1909. Putnam.
