= Cox-Klemin Aircraft Corporation =

Aircraft manufacturer

- Industry: Aerospace
- Founded: 1921
- Founders: Charles Cox; Alexander Klemin
- Defunct: 1925
- Fate: Bankrupt
- Headquarters: Baldwin, New York, United States

The Cox-Klemin Aircraft Corporation was an American aircraft manufacturer based in Long Island, New York in the 1920s.

== History ==
It was founded by Charles Cox and Alexander Klemin (a professor at New York University) in College Point, New York. The company took over an ordnance plant in Baldwin, New York in 1924. Later that year, it partnered with Ernst Heinkel to design and build a mailplane.

In defiance of prohibition, the company christened its new Nighthawk airplane using champagne in 1925.

The company filed for bankruptcy in 1925. However, bankruptcy proceedings continued into 1926. The case was further delayed after the court could not locate company management.

Grumman would later open its first plant in the shuttered Cox-Klemin factory in 1930.

== Aircraft ==
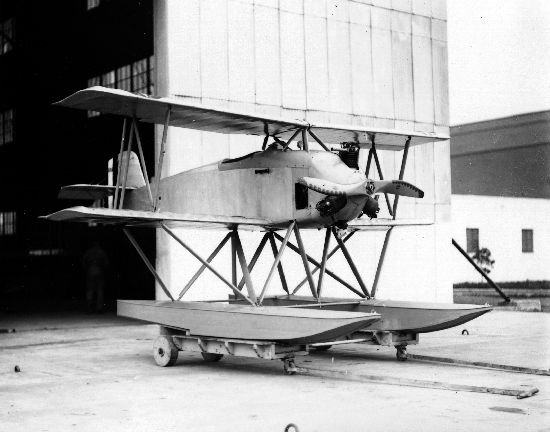
Cox-Klemin XS-1

| Model name | First flight | Number built | Type |
|---|---|---|---|
| Cox-Klemin CK-1 | | | Twin engine monoplane flying boat |
| Cox-Klemin TW-2 | | 3 | Single engine biplane trainer |
| Cox-Klemin CK-3 | | | Night observation airplane |
| Cox-Klemin CK-14 | | | Single engine biplane flying boat |
| Cox-Klemin XS | 1922 | 6 | Experimental single engine biplane floatplane scout |
| Cox-Klemin XA-1 | 1923 | 2 | Single engine biplane ambulance |
| Cox-Klemin CK-18 Sea Hawk | | 1 | Single engine biplane flying boat |
| Cox-Klemin CK-19 | | | Amphibious airplane |
| Cox-Klemin Night Hawk | | | Single engine biplane mailplane |
