= Cox-Klemin Night Hawk =

American mail plane

The Cox-Klemin Night Hawk is a 1.2-seater mail plane, made in the interwar period in the United States by the Cox-Klemin Aircraft Corporation for the US Air Mail Service. It was powered by a Liberty L-12 3 V-engine.
