= Lowe, Willard & Fowler Engineering Company =

American aerospace manufacturer 1915-1924

Lowe, Willard and Fowler Engineering Company (Note: Later reorganized as the L-W-F Engineering Company)
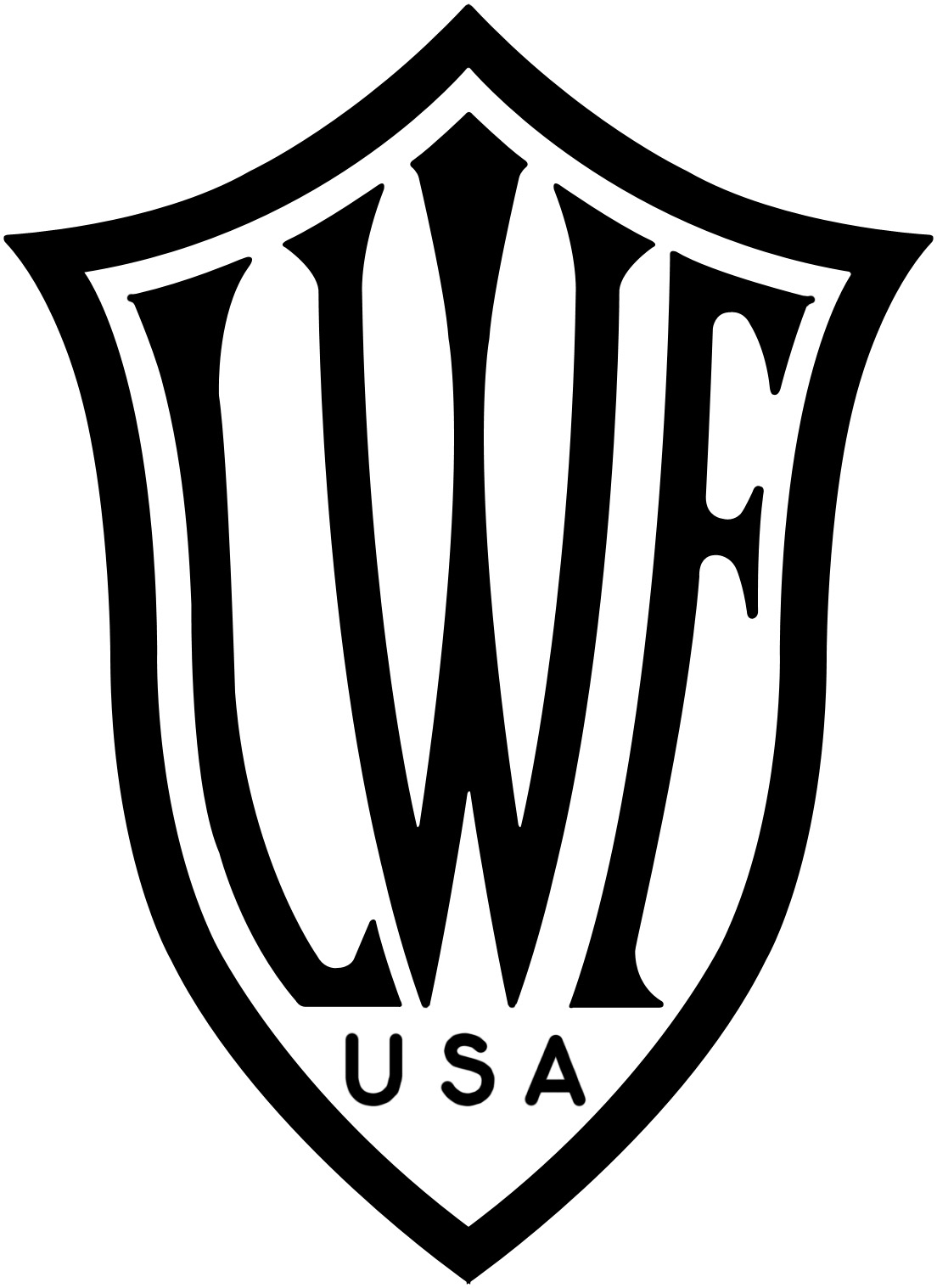
- Industry: Aerospace
- Founded: 1915
- Founders: Edward Lowe Jr. Charles F. Willard; Robert G. Fowler
- Defunct: 1924
- Fate: Bankruptcy
- Headquarters: Long Island City (1915 - 1916); College Point (1916 - 1924)
- Key people: J. M. Fitzgerland (Pres./director); A. H. Flint (VP/General Manager); R. J. Hoffman (Engineer); Glenn D. Mitchell (Engineer)
- Products: Aircraft

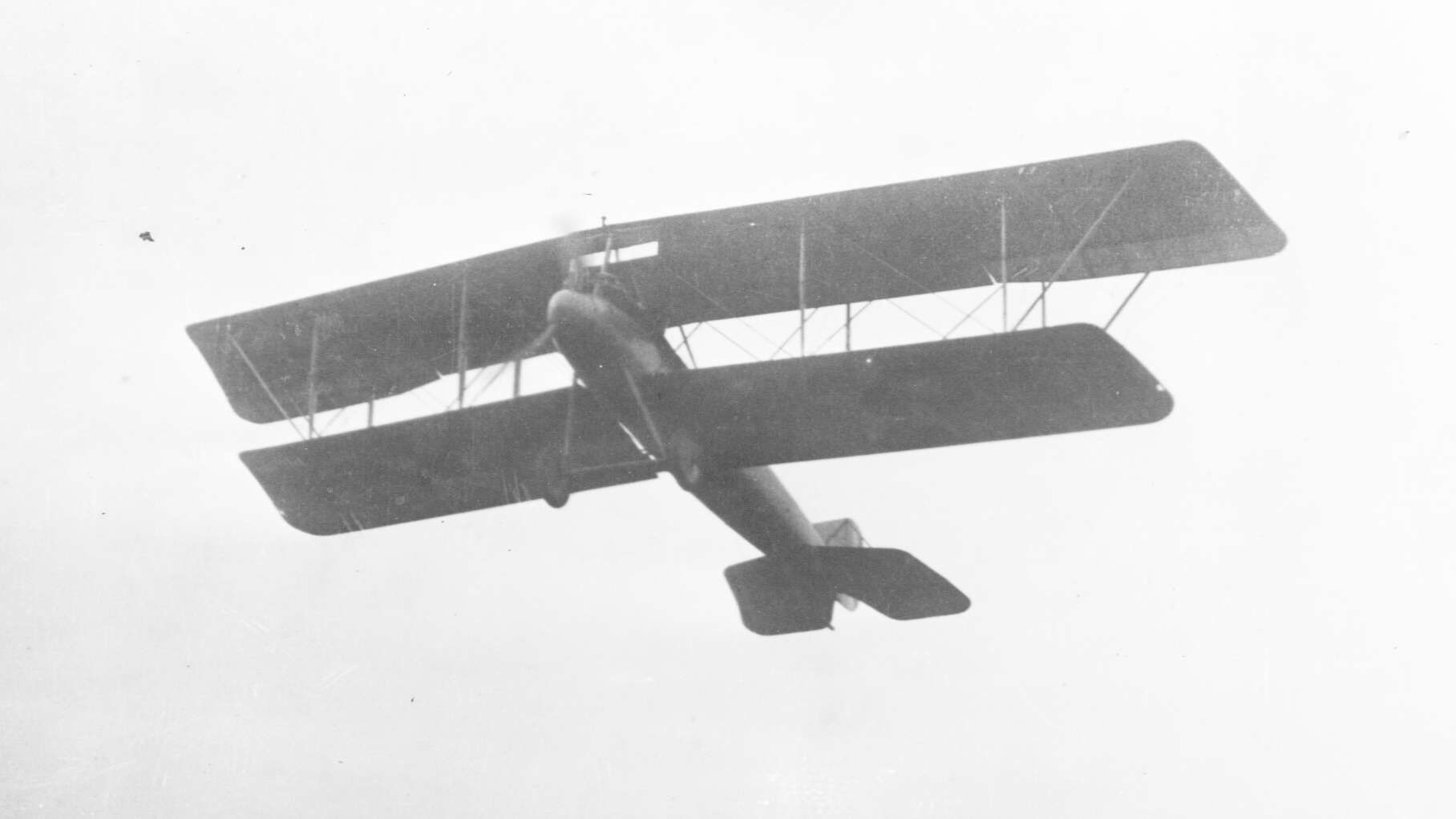
LWF model F (a modified model V) which made the first flight with a Liberty engine

The Lowe, Willard & Fowler Engineering Company was a College Point, New York City based manufacturer of airplanes founded in December 1915 named for its founders, Edward Lowe Jr., Charles F. Willard, and Robert G. Fowler,

Willard had been previously employed by the Curtiss Aeroplane and Motor Company and Aeromarine and had developed a technique for molding laminated wood to form a monocoque fuselage while Fowler had been the first person to fly west-to-east across the United States. Lowe arranged the majority of the financing, while Fowler recruited Willard.

Fowler and Willard departed the company shortly afterwards in 1916 and Lowe renamed the firm the L-W-F Engineering Company." After their departure from the company, the companies initials were repurposed to refer either to either Laminated Wood Fuselage or Linen, Wire and Fabric. The company was reorganized after Lowe was forced out by company backers in 1917.

Aside from its own designs, of which only the model V and its derivatives, and the J-2 (a US Dehavilland DH-4 modified into a twin engine aircraft) saw series production, LWF built the Curtiss HS-2L, Martin NBS-1 and Douglas DT-2 under licence, and they modified 63 US Dehavilland DH-4As into DH-4Bs.

Following the reduction or cancellation of orders following the end of World War I and the failure of its post-war designs to win orders, the company declared bankruptcy in 1924.

== Aircraft ==
Aircraft	Year	Number built
LWF Designs
Model V	1916	136
Model F	1917	1
Reconnaissance	1917	1
Model G	1918	1
Model H Owl	1920	1
Model J-2 Twin DH	1919	20
Model L Butterfly	1920	1
XT-3	1923	1
MO-1	unk.	1
XNBS-2	n/a	0
Total built:		163
Licence-built/modified
Curtiss HS-2L	1917	249 (Note: Order for 299, but 50 cancelled)
US Dehavilland DH-4B (modified)	?	63
Douglas DT-2/SDW-1	1922	20
Martin NBS-1	1921	35
Total built/modified:		367

== See also ==
- List of aircraft manufacturers
