= Gallaudet PW-4 =

Biplane fighter aircraft

PW-4
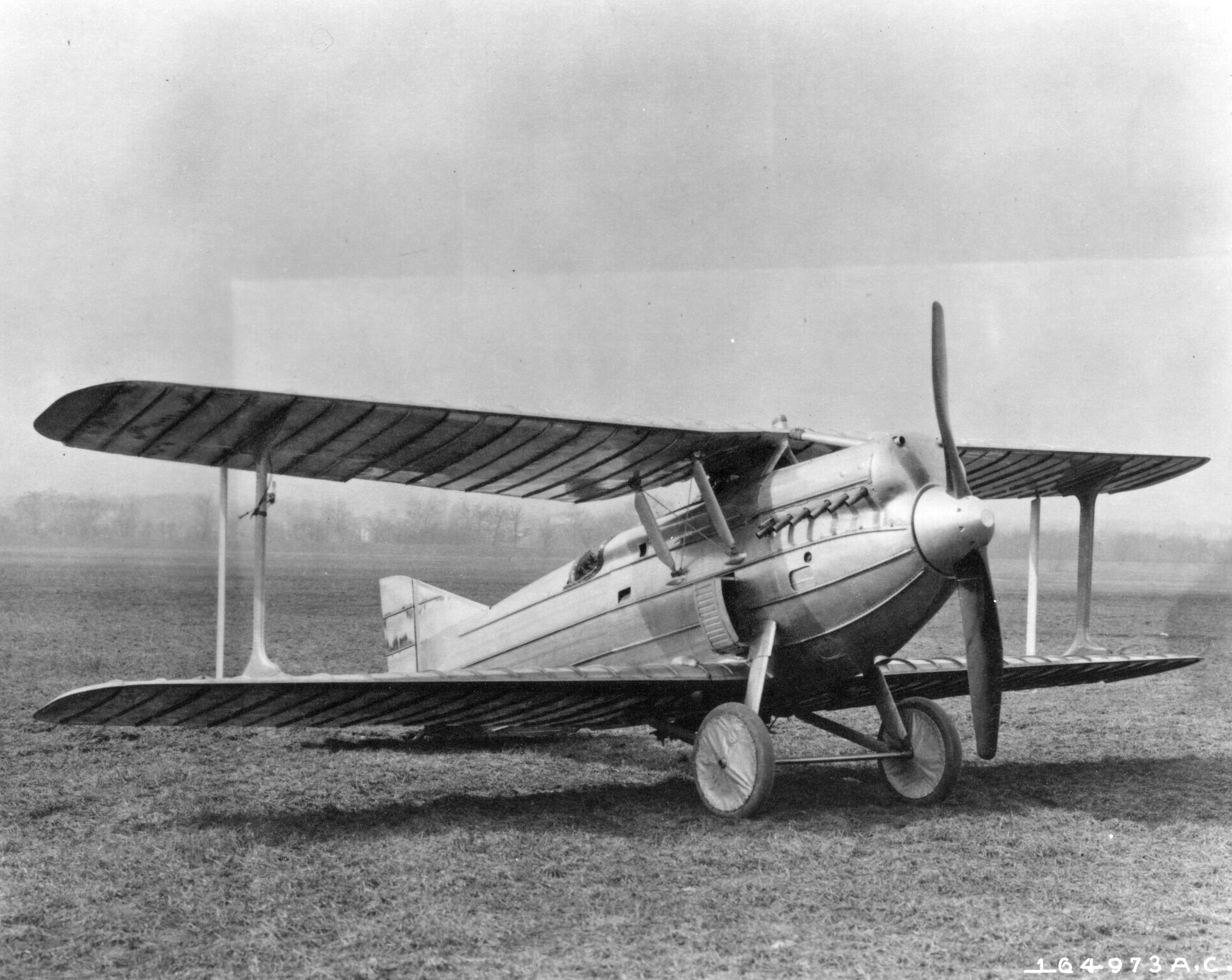
- PW-4

General information
- Type: Fighter
- Manufacturer: Gallaudet Aircraft Company
- Number built: 1

History
- First flight: Never flew

The Gallaudet PW-4 was a prototype biplane fighter aircraft built by the Gallaudet Aircraft Company. It was one of the last projects by the company before it was taken over by Consolidated Aircraft. It was all-metal and powered by a Packard 11A-1237 engine. Three prototypes were ordered by the USAAC, but the company could afford to build only one, which never flew.

== Specifications ==
Data from Angelucci, 1987. pp. 202-203.

General characteristics

- Crew: one
- Length: 22 ft 8 in (6.90 m)
- Wingspan: 29 ft 10 in (9.09 m)
- Height: 8 ft 0 in (2.43 m)
- Wing area: 245 sq ft (22.76 m^{2})
- Empty weight: 2,203 lb (999 kg)
- Gross weight: 3,040 lb (1,379 kg)
- Powerplant: 1 × Packard 1A-1237 , 350 hp (260 kW)

Performance

- Maximum speed: 145 mph (233 km/h, 126 kn)
