= L-W-F T-3 =

T-3

General information
- Type: Liaison biplane
- National origin: United States
- Manufacturer: L-W-F Engineering Company Inc.
- Primary user: United States Army Air Service
- Number built: 1

History
- First flight: 1923

The L-W-F T-3 was an American eight-passenger transport biplane built for the United States Army Air Service (USAAS) by the L-W-F Engineering Company Inc. Designated T-3 by the Army it was a conventional biplane powered by a 400 hp (298 kW) Liberty L-12A engine. It had an open cockpit for the pilot and an enclosed cabin for eight passengers. The sole T-3 was delivered to the USAAS in 1923, re-designated XT-3 and used as an engine test bed. A further nine T-3s on order were cancelled and not built.

== Specifications ==
Data from

General characteristics

- Crew: 1
- Capacity: 8 passengers
- Length: 42 ft 0 in (12.80 m)
- Wingspan: 52 ft 0 in (15.85 m)
- Powerplant: 1 × Liberty L-12A V-12 water-cooled piston engine, 400 hp (300 kW)
- Propellers: 2-bladed fixed-pitch propeller
