= Ernest Emery Harmon =

US Army Air Force officer

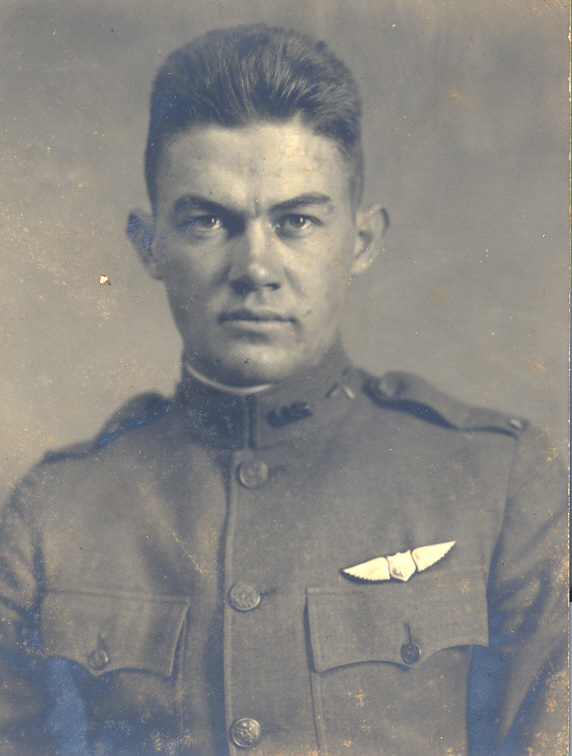
- Captain Harmon in 1918
- Born: February 8, 1893; Fort Worth, Texas, U.S.
- Died: August 27, 1933 (aged 40); Stamford, Connecticut, U.S.
- Occupations: aviator, soldier

Captain Ernest Emery Harmon, Army Air Corps (February 8, 1893–August 27, 1933) was an aviation pioneer. Lesser known than many of the major figures of early flight, his significant contributions during the golden age of aviation (aka the interwar years) resulted, by an act of Congress (June 23, 1948), in the naming of Ernest Harmon Air Force Base in his honor. Dedication ceremonies occurred on August 13, 1949, at the base in Stephenville, Newfoundland.

== Earns his wings ==
Harmon earned his wings in May 1918 at Gerstner Field, Louisiana, where he went on to become a flight, gunnery, and bombing instructor. Later (after a hurricane devastated Gerstner Field) Harmon was transferred to Wilbur Wright Field in Dayton, Ohio. During his career in the Signal Enlisted Corps, and the Army Air Corps, he also spent time at Bolling Field, Washington, D.C., France Field, Panama Canal Zone, and Mitchel Field, Long Island.

== The "Around-the-Rim" flight ==
From July 24 to November 9, 1919, Lieutenant Harmon piloted the first ever flight around the continental United States, four years before John A. Macready and Oakley G. Kelly flew the first non-stop transcontinental flight across the United States, and eight years before Charles A. Lindbergh's historic Atlantic Ocean crossing. Also on the flight was his commanding officer, Lt. Col. Rutherford Hartz, and two mechanics, Sgt. Jerry Dobias and Sgt. Jack Harding. Original plans called for a second pilot, Lt. Lotha A. Smith, but due to an injury that resulted from a crash landing in Jay, New York, he was forced to abandon the high risk mission shortly after it began. This left pilot Ernest "Tiny" Harmon (he was 6 feet 3 inches) with the primary responsibility of assuring the successful completion of the 3-month-long mission. The pioneering flight was monitored by the entire nation, and generated front-page headlines in newspapers across the country. Often landing in farmer's fields, when no airstrip was available, the Round-The-Rim flight set an unprecedented milestone during the formative years of winged flight. The efforts of the R-T-R crew resulted in helping to establish, and improve landing strip markings and design, navigation and mapping standards, and basic aviation communication. Among the many objectives of the flight were to prove aircraft endurance over long flights, establish new air fields, generate enthusiasm for commercial and military aviation, and to inspire new recruits into military aviation service.

== Prediction of first transatlantic flight and vision of the future of aviation ==
In the March 30, 1919 issue of the New York Sun newspaper Harmon wrote an extensive article that provided a detailed plan for how to successfully complete the first transatlantic flight in a "heavier than air machine". While Harmon enthusiastically volunteered to be the pilot of the historic flight, his commanding officers in the Army had other plans for him (i.e. The "RIM" flight).

Also in the New York Sun article, Harmon clearly articulates his uncanny vision of the future of aviation. Included in his vision of the future are:

- He correctly predicted that the first transatlantic flight in history "will happen within the next 90 days" (Note: British aviators John Alcock & Arthur Brown made the first transatlantic flight ever from St. John's Newfoundland to Clifton, Ireland on June 14, 1919.)
- viable, and safe, commercial aviation travel by the general public will become commonplace
- transatlantic travel by air will quickly become routine
- "Air Taxis" (i.e. charter flights) between major US cities will become readily available
- "Aeroplane garages" for temporary (i.e. overnight) use by private pilots will become ubiquitous across America

On 22 May 1920, Harmon was the pilot for the first flight of the LWF model H Owl at Mitchel Field, Long Island, New York, a design intended for use as a mail plane.

== Flew an escort plane for "Spirit of St. Louis" during Lindbergh's triumphant return flight ==
During his historic return flight to St. Louis on June 17, 1927, shortly before 1:00 pm while Lindbergh was flying over Springfield, Army aviators from Bolling Field, D.C. and Selfridge Field, Mich. took off from Wright Field in Dayton, Ohio to provide a 21 plane flying escort for "The Spirit of St. Louis" and its ace pilot "Lucky Lindy". Lindbergh circled, but did not land at Wright Field. Instead, the assemblage of Army air aces escorted Lindbergh on his way back to St. Louis. Ernest "Tiny" Harmon, based at Bolling Field at the time, flew one of the escort planes.

In an interview with "The Belvidere Daily Republican" newspaper Harmon provided the following comments:

"Lindy has given aviation a boost all over the country" observed Lieut. E.E. "Tiny" Harmon who flew with the colonel (Lindbergh) in Army air training camps.

"The biggest kick Army pilots get out of his feat is the fact that, if he did get across the ocean, he would land in Paris after dark on a perfectly strange field. Knowing the danger of such an effort, aside from getting over the ocean, he just went ahead and did it. That's what gets the pilots. And, he's helped aviation everywhere. I know two boys who bought a commercial plane the day before Lindy landed in Paris. They paid for it out of their receipts in three days. It's the same now with all commercial aviation. Lindy has rescued it."

== Aviation records ==
On February 19, 1919, Lieutenant Harmon set an air speed record flying a 400 hp LePere aeroplane from Washington, D.C. to New York City, achieving 165.1 miles per hour (265.7 km/h) and covering the distance in 85 minutes. After the flight, his passenger, Lt. Col. R.F. Hartz said Lt. Harmon "burnt the air" in order to accomplish the unprecedented feat.

On June 30, 1919, Harmon flew a Martin MB-1 bomber non-stop from the Martin factory in Dayton, Ohio to Washington D.C., covering the 390 miles (630 km) in three hours and 45 minutes, yet another speed record for him at the time.

On October 14, 1925 at the National Air Races, at Mitchel Field piloting a Huff-Daland XLB transport plane, Harmon won the Detroit Daily News Trophy and $1000 in Liberty bonds by achieving a speed of 119.91 miles per hour (192.98 km/h) over a course of 120 miles.

=== Wife sets record ===
On May 30, 1919, Harmon's wife, Harriette Alexander Harmon, was a passenger on one of his flights from Bolling Field in Washington D.C. to Hazelhurst Field ( aka Mitchel Field ), Long Island. This flight, which took off at 11:10 am and lasted two hours and forty five minutes, established Mrs. Harmon as the first woman ever to fly from the nation's capital to New York City. Other passengers included Col. Robert E. O'Brien, Col. William C. Sherman, and Maj. Raycroft Walsh.

== Other notable flights ==
Lieutenant Harmon was the first pilot ever to fly the giant L.W.F "Owl" Bomber with its three 400 hp Liberty motors.

In 1924, Harmon piloted the infamous Barling Bomber. He took off from Mitchel Field and crash landed literally across the street in Roosevelt Field, Long Island. After the flight, he deemed the Barling Bomber as "not yet airworthy". Ultimately in 1928, General Hap Arnold ordered the plane destroyed due to its inferior and unsafe design.

In 1926, Harmon, with his bombardier Harold George, won the bombing contest in the "heavier than air bomber" category at the international air races in Philadelphia.

== Aviators recruited and trained by Harmon ==
While Capt. Harmon met an untimely death in an aviation accident in 1933, he is credited with having recruited, and mentored the careers of many individuals who went on to become heroes, and leaders in the United States military. In 1924, Harmon saw promise in a young University of Maryland football quarterback named Pete Quesada. Harmon took Quesada flying out of Bolling Field in Washington D.C. and successfully recruited him on the same day into the Army Air Service. Harmon, himself a former football player at Bethany College, West Virginia, had an ulterior motive in recruiting Quesada into the Air Service. It was to include Quesada on the Air Service football team at Brooks Field in San Antonio, Texas while he was in flight training. Later in his career, Gen. Pete Quesada, and his Ninth Air Tactical Command, led the air invasion on D-Day (June 6, 1944 aka "Overlord") during World War II. Lt. Gen Pete Quesada is widely recognized as having developed the strategy of proving the successful use of tactical "close air support" to ground troops during combat. After WWII, President Dwight Eisenhower appointed Pete Quesada to be the first director of the Federal Aviation Administration. President Eisenhower also tasked Quesada with site acquisition and oversight of the construction of Dulles International Airport. (note: this true anecdote, as told in "Overlord" by Thomas Alexander Hughes, is sometimes confused with Gen. Millard Harmon. But it was Ernest Emery Harmon who recruited Quesada in 1924)

In 1918, while an instructor at Gerstner Field, Louisiana, Harmon trained the controversial Lieutenant Edmund G. Chamberlain who was reported to have shot down five enemy aircraft in one day during the first World War.

== Commanding Officer ==
In June 1932, Harmon was promoted to captain and was assigned commanding officer of the 5th Observation Squadron at Mitchel Field, Long Island.

== Death ==
Harmon died in a crash on August 27, 1933. On a flight from Easton, Md to Mitchel Field, Long Island he experienced heavy fog. Having no visibility (and no instruments), the plane he was piloting ran out of fuel near Stamford, Connecticut. Harmon tried to parachute out of the aircraft but he was too close to the ground for the parachute to work so he ended up falling to his death. "Peacetime flying activities (during the interwar period), even including ballooning, drained the air arm of some of its best men. Unlike other branches of the Army, the flying service was hazardous in peacetime as well as wartime, and there had to be a steady influx of officers and men to replace those killed in aircraft crashes. The Army air arm lost some of its potentially great leaders in this manner during the 1920s and 1930s. Outstanding in this group were Lt. Col. Horace M. Hickham, Capt. Ernest E. Harmon, Col. William C. McChord, Lt. Eugene H. Barksdale, Col. Leslie MacDill, and Maj. Harold Geiger". - from "A History of the United States Air Force 1907 - 1957" - Alfred Goldberg editor; published in 1957 by D. Van Nostrand Company, Inc. - Princeton, NJ; Library of Congress Card Catalog Number: 57-14552.

== Lackland Air Force Base ==
Harmon Drive at Lackland Air Force Base is named in Captain Harmon's honor.
