= Gallaudet DB-1 =

General information
- Type: Bomber
- Number built: 2

History
- Manufactured: between 1918 and 1923
- In service: didn't get to series
- Variant: Gallaudet DB-1B

The Gallaudet DB-1 was a United States day bomber prototype designed during World War I. Two prototypes of the aircraft were constructed, however testing revealed flight control issues and serious structural problems with the wings. The aircraft was known to be extremely heavy, becoming more than a ton over the weight it was designed to have. The aircraft never flew. The National Museum of the US Air Force states that "the DB-1, although unsuccessful, was quite advanced for its time." The aircraft was succeeded by the Gallaudet DB-1B, which was lighter, but the flight characteristics were still poor.
