= Engineering Division CO-2 =

American observation aircraft

XCO-2

General information
- Type: Biplane Observation aircraft
- National origin: United States
- Manufacturer: Engineering Division
- Designer: Jean A. Roche
- Status: prototype only
- Number built: 1

History
- First flight: 1922

The Engineering Division XCO-2 was an observation aircraft designed at the United States Army Air Corps Engineering Division.

== Development ==
The XCO-2 was a conventional biplane with four machine guns and a Liberty 12 engine, as well as a fabric covering. The prototype flew in 1922 but crashing during flight tests.

== Operators ==
United States

- United States Army Air Corps

== Specifications ==
Data from

General characteristics

- Crew: 2
- Length: 30 ft 9 in (9.37 m)
- Wingspan: 41 ft 1 in (12.52 m)
- Height: 10 ft 9 in (3.28 m)
- Wing area: 402 sq ft (37.3 m^{2})
- Empty weight: 2,669 lb (1,211 kg)
- Gross weight: 4,084 lb (1,852 kg)
- Powerplant: 1 × Liberty L-12 water-cooled V12 engine, 390 hp (290 kW)

Performance

- Maximum speed: 115 mph (185 km/h, 100 kn) at sea level
- Cruise speed: 117 mph (188 km/h, 102 kn)
- Range: 500 mi (800 km, 430 nmi)
- Endurance: 4 hr
- Service ceiling: 21,250 ft (6,480 m)
- Rate of climb: 550 ft/min (2.8 m/s)

== See also ==
Related lists

- List of military aircraft of the United States
