= James Charles Fahey =

American writer

- Born: 1903
- Died: 1974 (aged 70–71)
- Occupation: Author

James Charles Fahey (1903–1974) was an American writer best remembered as the original compiler and publisher of the popular American reference The Ships and Aircraft of the United States Fleet.

== The Ships and Aircraft of the United States Fleet ==
James Fahey lived in the Bronx working as a cab driver and merchant marine sailor while he wrote for various publications on the subject of military ships and aircraft. His disappointment at editors "butchering" his manuscripts caused him to self-publish the first edition of Ships and Aircraft of the United States Fleet in 1939. He carefully compiled data from unclassified sources and had a unique talent for presenting a great deal of information in compact, tabular format. His softbound 48-page booklet sold for fifty cents, and gained public interest as World War II unfolded. An updated second edition (the Two Ocean Fleet Edition) was published in the same 48-page format in 1941, and sold for seventy-five cents. His third edition (the first War Edition) in 1942. The updated third edition had grown to 64 pages in the same softbound format, and sold for one dollar. Significant quantities were ordered by the United States Navy to train the officers and sailors mobilized to man the new ships. An updated Second War Edition was published in 1944, and the 96-page updated 1945 Victory Edition enjoyed enormous popular interest from returning veterans. Fahey documented the Korean War fleet in the 1950 6th edition, the Cold War fleet in the 1958 7th edition, and the Vietnam War fleet in the 1965 8th edition. The 9th and 10th editions were compiled by John Rowe and Samuel Morison. Norman Polmar has authored subsequent editions.

== Other publications ==
Fahey published a companion 64-page reference booklet for one dollar in 1946 entitled U. S. Army Aircraft (Heavier than Air) 1908-1946 and subsequently documented early Cold War developments in USAF and United States Army Aircraft: 1947-1956.
