= Gallaudet DB-1B =

DB-1B
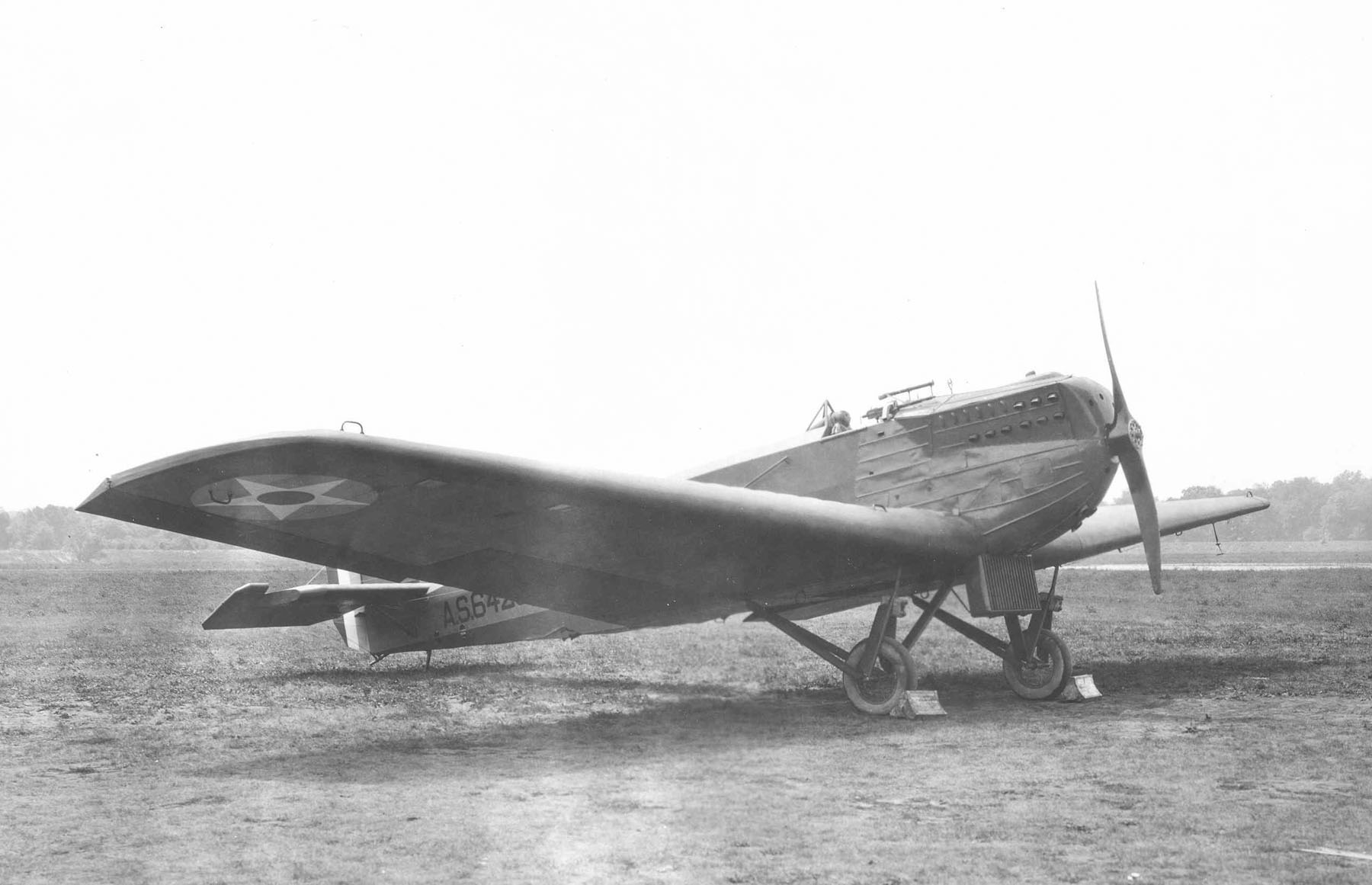
- The Gallaudet DB-1B prototype

General information
- Type: Bomber
- Number built: 1

History
- Manufactured: between 1918 and 1923
- In service: didn't get to series
- Developed from: Gallaudet DB-1

The Gallaudet DB-1B was a United States daytime bomber designed during World War I. It was the successor to the Gallaudet DB-1, a very heavy aircraft with flight control issues and serious structural problems with the wings, which never got past the ground test phase. The DB-1B was lighter than the DB-1, having redesigned, stronger wings. The DB-1B, unlike its predecessor, did manage to complete several test flights. However, the project was scrapped when flight performance was poor.
