= Cox-Klemin TW-2 =

General information
- Type: Biplane trainer
- Manufacturer: Cox-Klemin Aircraft Corporation
- Primary user: United States Army Air Corps
- Number built: 3

History
- First flight: 1921

The Cox-Klemin TW-2 was a 1920s American biplane training aircraft built by the Cox-Klemin Aircraft Corporation. It was powered by a water-cooled Hispano-Suiza 8 V8 aero-engine.

== Development ==
The CK-2 was a biplane with single-bay biplane that utilized a Fokker scheme of N-shaped interplane struts and metal cabane. Three aircraft were built, two flight articles that were used to test different engines and one static test article. However, the TW-2 was not ordered into production.

== Operators ==
United States

- United States Army Air Service

== Specifications ==
General characteristics

- Crew: 2
- Length: 23 ft (7.0 m)
- Wingspan: 29 ft (8.8 m)
- Gross weight: 2,505 lb (1,136 kg)
- Powerplant: 1 × Wright Hispano E V-8 liquid-cooled piston engine, 180 hp (130 kW)
- Propellers: 2-bladed fixed-pitch pusher propeller

Performance

- Maximum speed: 99 mph (159 km/h, 86 kn)

== See also ==
Related lists

- List of military aircraft of the United States
