= Engineering Division CO-1 =

Prototype American army observation aircraft of 1922

CO-1

General information
- Type: army observation aircraft
- National origin: United States
- Manufacturer: Engineering Division, USAAS; Gallaudet Aircraft Company
- Designer: Isaac Laddon
- Number built: 3

History
- First flight: July 22, 1922

The Engineering Division CO-1 was a prototype observation aircraft built for the United States Army Air Service in 1922. It was the Army's first all-metal aircraft, and the first all-metal aircraft designed and built in the United States. It proved to be underpowered, and was not selected for production, and a fabric-covered version designated CO-3 was canceled without being built.

== Design ==
The CO-1 was a shoulder-wing, cantilever monoplane of conventional design, with open cockpits for the pilot and observer in tandem. It had fixed, tailskid undercarriage, and a conventional tail. Power was provided by a piston engine in the nose driving a tractor propeller. Construction throughout was of duralumin and the aircraft was skinned with corrugated sheets of the material.

== Development ==
The CO-1 was developed as the first of the USAAS's "Corps Observation" aircraft, intended for battlefield surveillance and artillery spotting. It was designed by Isaac "Mac" Laddon, who headed the large aircraft workshop at McCook Field and two examples were built there. The first was used for static testing, and the second first flew on July 26, 1922.

From the start, the design proved excessively heavy. Its landing gear collapsed on its first landing, and the Liberty engine specified by the Army proved to be insufficient to power the aircraft. With the cockpits positioned above the wing, it also proved to have poor visibility, a major problem for an observation aircraft. Laddon alleviated that by adding a cutout at the wing root, allowing the pilot and observer a limited line of sight.

Despite these problems, the Army issued a contract to the Gallaudet Aircraft Company in 1922 to build three more. Gallaudet made some improvements, including larger ailerons and reinforced landing gear. The first aircraft was delivered in April 1923 and flew on June 20. However, the changes were insufficient to salvage the design, and the contract was cancelled along with the entire project.

A fabric-covered development, designated CO-3 was canceled without being built.

== Variants ==
Engineering Division CO-1
Two prototypes built by the Engineering Division
Gallaudet CO-1
One prototype built by Gallaudet Aircraft Company (two others canceled)
CO-3
Planned version with fabric skin; canceled without being built

== Specifications (Gallaudet CO-1) ==
Data from Historical Office of the Army Air Forces 1947, p.180

General characteristics

- Crew: two: pilot and observer
- Length: 33 ft 7 in (10.24 m)
- Wingspan: 55 ft 9 in (16.99 m)
- Height: 10 ft 4 in (3.15 m)
- Empty weight: 2,977 lb (1,350 kg)
- Gross weight: 10,474 lb (4,751 kg)
- Powerplant: 1 × Liberty L12 liquid-cooled, twelve-cylinder V engine, 390 hp (290 kW)

Performance

- Maximum speed: 118 mph (190 km/h, 103 kn)
- Range: 515 mi (829 km, 448 nmi)
- Service ceiling: 18,400 ft (5,600 m)
- Time to altitude: 6,500 feet (2,000 m) in 10.4 minutes

Armament

- Guns: 4× 0.30-inch (7.6 mm) machine guns

== Notes ==
=== Bibliography ===
- Air Force Life Cycle Management Center History Office (June 20, 2023). "This Week In AFLCMC History - June 19 - 25, 2023". Air Force Life Cycle Management Center.
- Historical Office of the Army Air Forces (1947). The Official Pictorial History of the AAF. New York: Duell, Sloan, and Pearce.
- The Illustrated Encyclopedia of Aircraft. London: Aerospace Publishing.
- Swanborough, Gordon (1963). United States Military Aircraft Since 1909. London: Putnam.
