= Cox-Klemin XA-1 =

Defunct air ambulance biplane prototype

XA-1
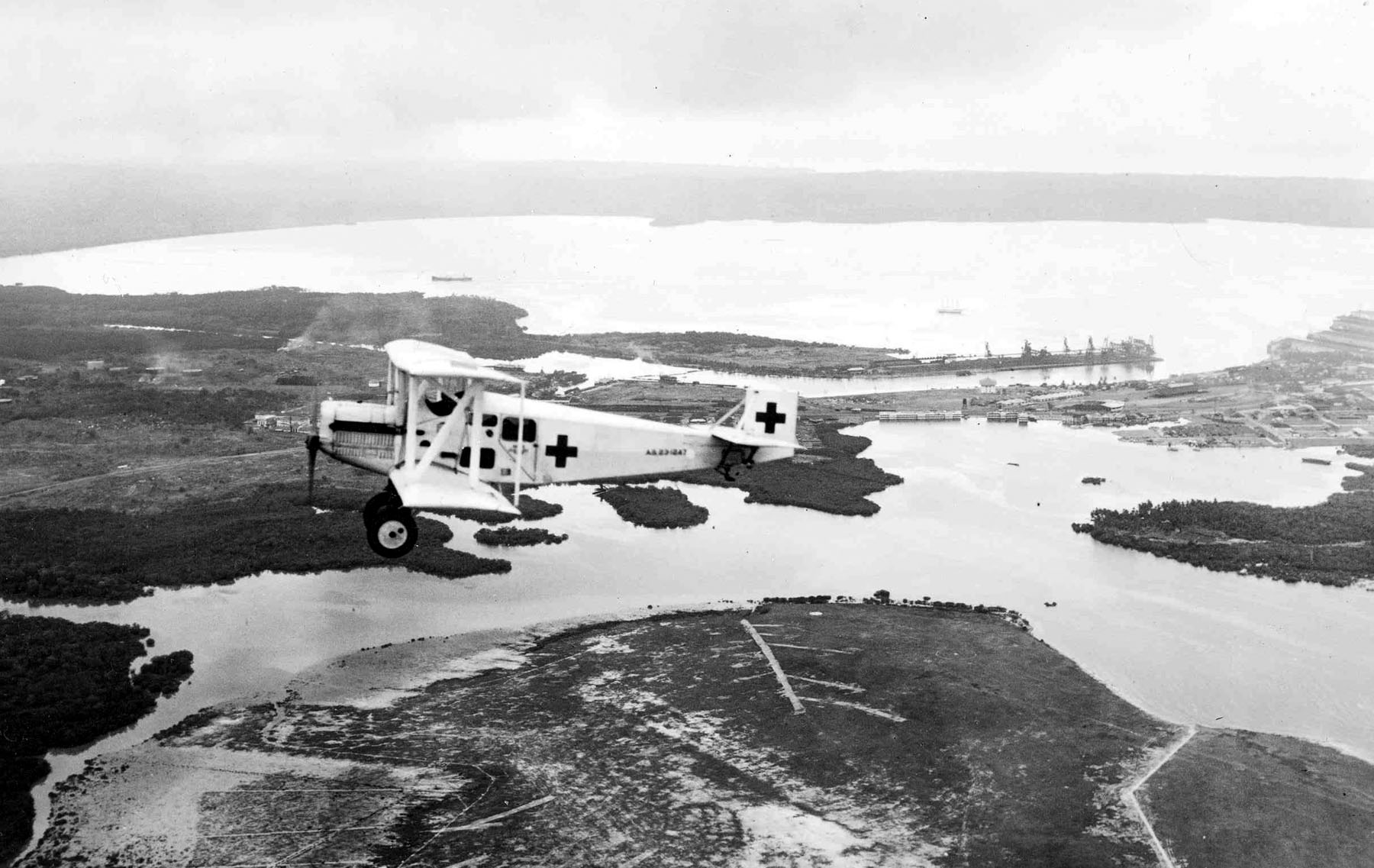

General information
- Type: Ambulance Biplane
- National origin: United States
- Manufacturer: Cox-Klemin Aircraft Corporation
- Primary user: United States Army Air Service
- Number built: 2

History
- First flight: 1923

The Cox-Klemin XA-1 was a 1920s American air ambulance biplane designed and built by the Cox-Klemin Aircraft Corporation for the United States Army Air Service, only two prototypes were built.

== Design and development ==
The XA-1 was designed as an ambulance aircraft to replace modified de Havilland DH.4 aircraft with the United States Army Air Service. The XA-1 was a biplane powered by a 420 hp (313 kW) Liberty 12A engine with a fixed conventional landing gear, it had a crew of two and room for two stretchers. Two prototype aircraft designated XA-1 (A-1 was the first allocation in the army air services ambulance designation system) were flown but no further aircraft were built.

The aircraft gained fame for flying injured individuals to hospitals in the aftermath of the 1927 Rocksprings tornado . It was retired in 1932.

== Specifications (XA-1) ==
Data from

General characteristics

- Crew: 2
- Capacity: 2 litters
- Length: 30 ft 8 in (9.35 m)
- Wingspan: 44 ft 0 in (13.41 m)
- Powerplant: 1 × Liberty L-12A V-12 liquid-cooled piston engine, 420 hp (310 kW)

Performance

- Maximum speed: 121 mph (195 km/h, 105 kn)
