= Douglas XNO-1 =

American observation aircraft proposal

Douglas NO-1

General information
- Type: Night observation aircraft
- Manufacturer: Douglas
- Status: design study only
- Primary user: US Army Air Corps
- Number built: 0

The Douglas NO-1 was a 1920s proposal for a reconnaissance aircraft by Douglas.

== Design ==
The NO-1 was intended to use a pusher engine configuration and utilize one Curtiss V-1400 V-cylinder engine capable of delivering 500 horsepower.
