= L-W-F Model H Owl =

1920s American biplane

Model H Owl
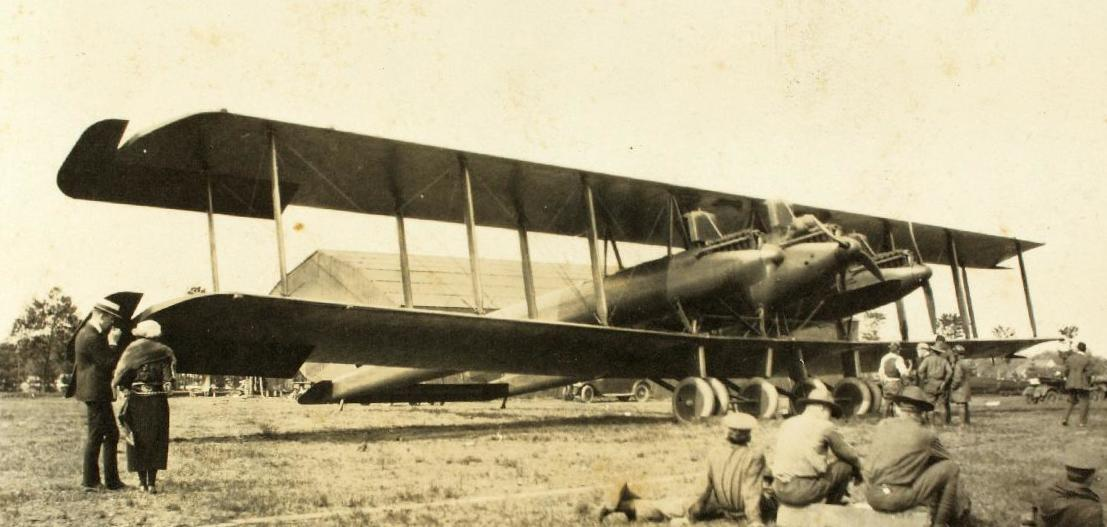

General information
- Type: Mail plane / bomber
- National origin: United States
- Manufacturer: LWF Engineering
- Primary user: United States Army Air Service
- Number built: 1

History
- Introduction date: 1920
- First flight: 22 May 1920
- Retired: 1923

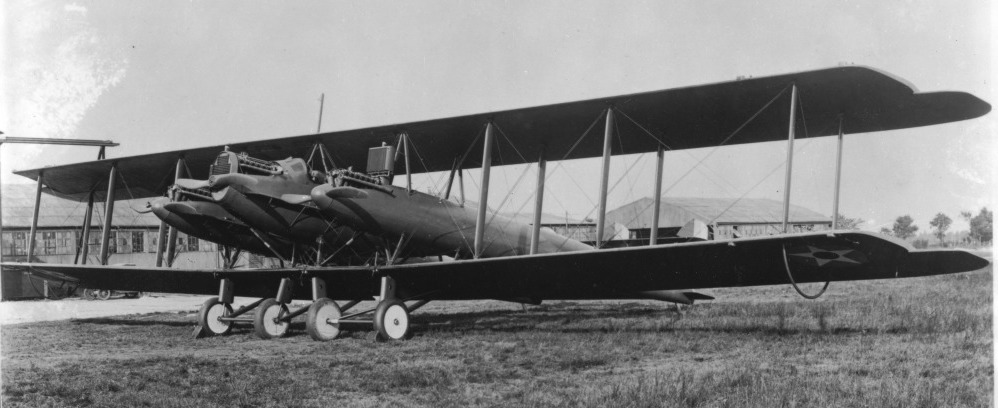
LWF Model H Owl in its later form, with simplified undercarriage and relocated center radiator

The L-W-F Model H Owl was a large American twin-boom trimotor biplane designed and built by LWF Engineering as a mail plane in 1920, but after being rejected for that role, the single prototype was sold to the United States Army Air Service for evaluation as a bomber but failed to secure any orders.

== Design and development ==
It had a center nacelle with room for three crew members suspended on struts between the wings and flanked on either side by similarly braced tail booms. All three fuselages had a Liberty L-12 400 hp (300 kW) engine in the nose, and were fabricated from laminated wood in the same manner as had been used in prior LWF fuselage designs, with three thin layers of wood laid at an angle to each other and separated with fabric. The four bay biplane wings were fitted with ailerons on both upper and lower wings. It had a biplane horizontal stabilizer with three rudders, and ailerons on all four wings. No fin was provided for the center rudder. All controls were given generous aerodynamic counterbalances to reduce control forces. The initial six-wheel undercarriage was later modified to four-wheels, and the radiator for the center engine was moved from in front of the pilot to between the engine and the propeller.

== Operational history ==
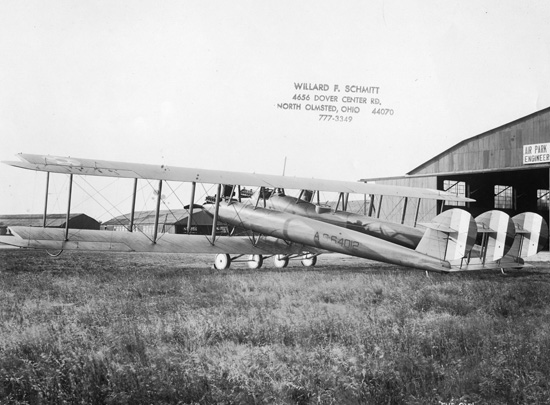
LWF model H Owl A.S.64012 showing off its twin booms and biplane tail with triple rudders.

The Owl was first flown by Ernest Harmon from Mitchel Field, on Long Island, New York, on 22 May 1920.

Although built for night air mail service (hence being named Owl), it failed to interest the Post Office.

Between 1921 and 1922, the United States Army Air Service evaluated it as a bomber at Langley Field in Virginia when it was allocated Army Air Service serial number 64012, however its performance was described as “adequate but not impressive.” General Billy Mitchell planned to evaluate the design during the bombing tests to sink the USS New Jersey and the USS Virginia in September 1923, but it does not appear that this actually occurred. The sole prototype was scrapped in 1923. Two prototypes of the XNBS-2, a scaled-down twin-engine derivative of the Owl, were ordered in 1923, but this order was cancelled before construction began.

== Variants ==
Model H Owl
biplane mailplane/bomber, one built.
NBS-2
Scaled down twin-engined version. Order for two cancelled and none built.

== Operators ==
United States
United States Army Air Service

== Specifications (model H Owl) ==
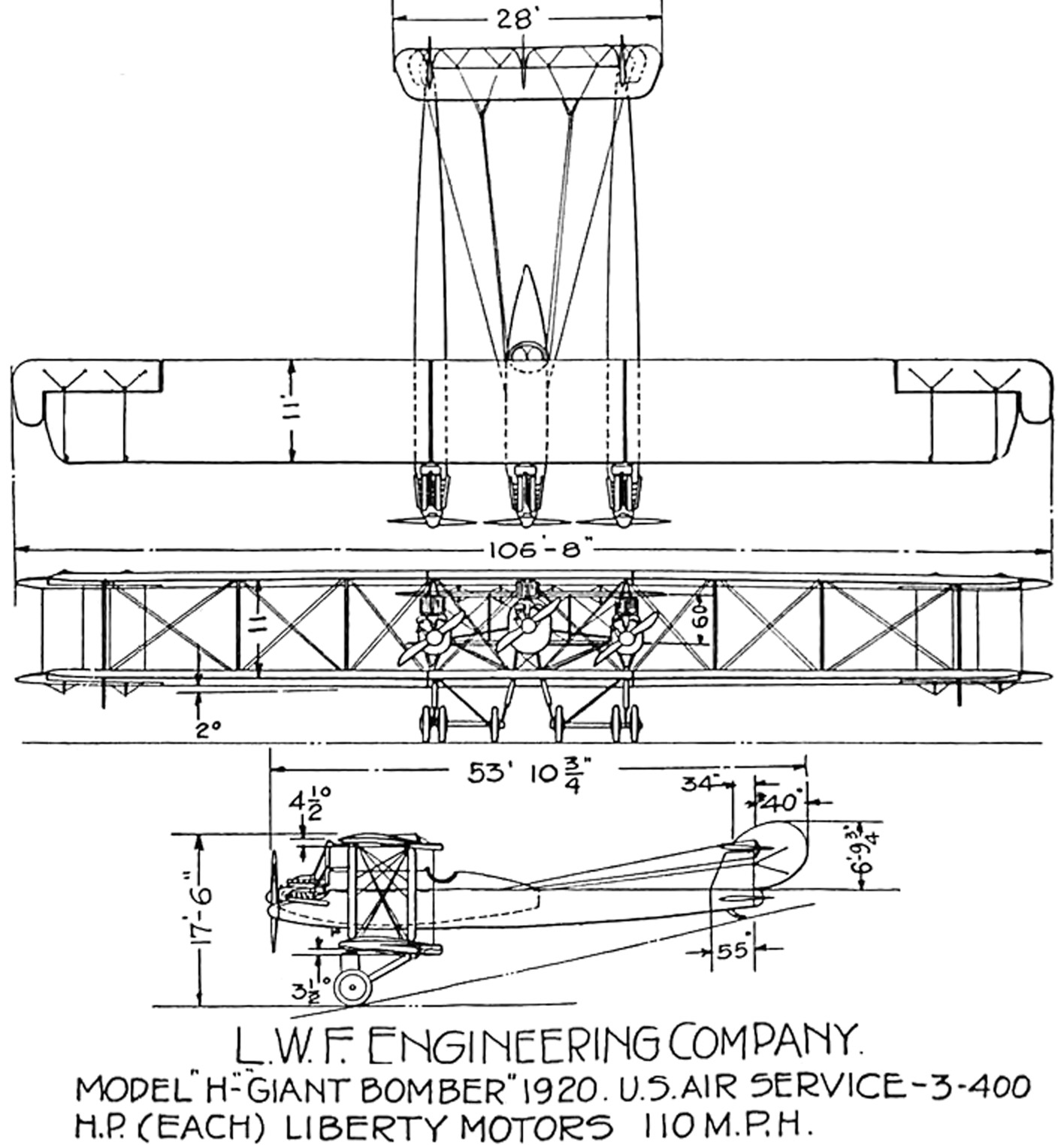
LWF model H Owl 3-view drawing

Data from Aircraft Year Book 1921

General characteristics

- Crew: Three
- Length: 53 ft 9.5 in (16.396 m)
- Wingspan: 106 ft 8 in (32.51 m) (equal span wings)
- Wing chord: 11 ft 0 in (3.35 m)
- Height: 17 ft 6 in (5.33 m)
- Wing area: 2,216 sq ft (205.9 m^{2})
- Airfoil: USA 6
- Empty weight: 13,386 lb (6,072 kg)
- Gross weight: 21,186 lb (9,610 kg)
- Useful load: 7,800 lb (3,500 kg)
- Undercarriage track: 0.00 m (0 ft)
- Powerplant: 3 × Liberty L-12 V-12 water-cooled piston engines, 400 hp (300 kW) each
- Propellers: 2-bladed LWF fixed pitch wood propellers, 9 ft 6 in (2.90 m) diameter

Performance

- Maximum speed: 110 mph (180 km/h, 96 kn) at sea level
  - 109 mph (175 km/h; 95 kn) at 6,000 ft (1,800 m)
- Stall speed: 56 mph (90 km/h, 49 kn)
- Range: 1,100 mi (1,800 km, 960 nmi)
- Service ceiling: 15,000 ft (4,600 m)
- Time to altitude: 10 minutes to 6,000 ft (1,800 m)
- Wing loading: 10.4 lb/sq ft (51 kg/m^{2})
- Power/mass: 0.057 hp/lb (0.094 kW/kg)
- Take-off run: 400 ft (122 m) fully loaded

== See also ==
Aircraft of comparable role, configuration, and era

- Caproni Ca.5
- Grahame-White Ganymede
- Thomas-Morse MB-4

Related lists

- List of Trimotors
- List of Twin-boom aircraft
