= Henry Combs =

American structural engineer (1916–2016)

Henry Combs (December 4, 1916 – May 28, 2016) was a structural engineer at Clarence Johnson's famed Skunk Works division of Lockheed Corporation. He was Deputy Project Manager on the Lockheed U-2 program, Head Structural Engineer on the SR-71 Blackbird, and later, Technical Director of the Skunk Works. While he is most known for his integral work on the U-2, the SR-71 and the F-117 Nighthawk, he also worked on the F-104, Lockheed Constellation, C-130 Hercules, XP-58 Chain Lightning, and Lockheed JetStar.

Combs is revered as the father of the titanium A-12 structure. According to Ben Rich in "Skunk Works", Combs was the "dean" of the eight man structures group and an "irascible genius". Combs spoke on the U-2's development at the CIA's "The CIA and the U-2 Program" conference on 17 September 1998.

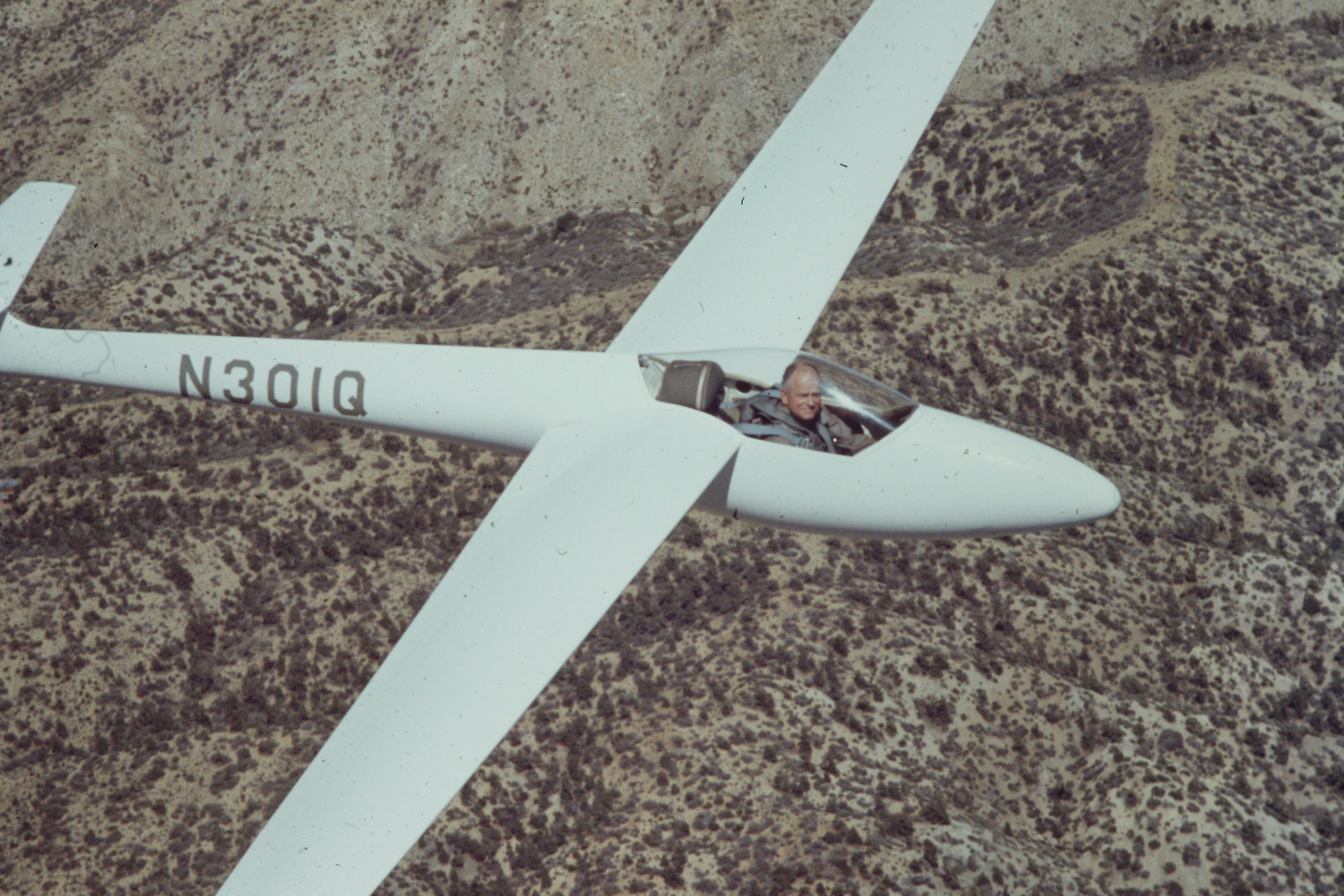
Combs flying his Libelle over Southern California. Photo by his brother, Alec Combs.

An accomplished sailplane (glider) pilot, Combs became famous within the soaring community for his weekly cross-country distance flights. Owing to the notable success of these flights, he became the leader of a fiercely loyal group of competition and cross-country sailplane pilots known as the "Crystal Squadron", based at Crystalaire gliderport in Llano, CA. From the mid 1980s through the early 2000s, this group of pilots, under Combs' spiritual and technical leadership, flew hundreds of long-distance soaring flights from Southern California to Nevada, Utah, and Arizona. In 1998, he completed his 200th straight-out long-distance flight meeting or exceeding the FAI "Diamond Badge" distance of 311 miles (500 km).

He was also well known for his extensive modifications and performance tuning work on the classic Glasflugel H-301 Libelle sailplane. Because of the numerous aerodynamic improvements made by Combs to his aircraft, it was capable of achieving performance levels on a par with more modern aircraft flown by the other members of the group. The net effect of these expert aircraft modifications, combined with his excellent piloting skills, was that (to their amazement and chagrin) Combs was often able to fly farther and faster than the other members of the Crystal Squadron, many of whom had spent three or four times the money on far newer "state of the art" sailplanes. This served only to further perpetuate the "irascible genius" legend, long after his Skunk Works days had passed. His soaring legacy is honored by the Soaring Society of America's "Henry Combs Perpetual Trophy".

Combs died on May 28, 2016, at the age of 99.
