= Sikorsky XBLR-3 =

Type of bomber

XBLR-3
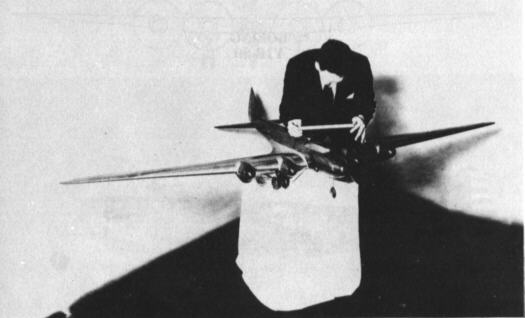
- Wooden mock-up at 1/25th scale

General information
- Type: Heavy bomber
- National origin: United States
- Manufacturer: Sikorsky Aircraft
- Status: Canceled, not built

The Sikorsky XBLR-3 was an experimental bomber design developed by Sikorsky Aircraft to compete in the United States Army Air Corps "Project D" design competition of 1935. In March 1936 the USAAC canceled the Sikorsky XBLR-3 in favor of the remaining two competitors: the Boeing XBLR-1 (Later XB-15) and the Douglas XBLR-2 (Later XB-19). The XBLR-3 was one of the last fixed wing aircraft designed by the Sikorsky company.

== Design and development ==
The Sikorsky XBLR-3 was powered four 1600 hp 24 cylinder Allison V-3420 engine driving one 4.57m diameter metal adjustable propeller each. The Allison V-3420 engine was specified for all three entries in the 1935 "Project D" competition.

Details of the Sikorsky XBLR-3's armament are not known, however a rotating dorsally-mounted Ball turret was included in the preliminary wooden model, and bombs of unknown parameters can be assumed to be included in the design perimeters.

== Specifications ==
=== Size ===
Span: 62.45m (204.9 ft)

Length: 36.58m (120 ft)

Height: 10.67m (35 ft)

=== Mass ===
Takeoff Weight: 54,422Kg (120,000 lb.)

=== Performance ===
Top Speed: 355 km/h (221 mph / 192 knots)

Cruising Speed: 205km/h (127 mph / 111 knots)

Maximum Range: 12,312km (7,652 mi. / 6,648 nm)

Flight Endurance: 62 hours
