= Martin XB-16 =

American bomber project

XB-16

General information
- Type: Bomber
- National origin: United States
- Manufacturer: Glenn L. Martin Company
- Status: Project only – canceled

The Martin XB-16, company designation Model 145, was a projected heavy bomber designed in the United States during the 1930s.

== Design and development ==
The XB-16 was designed to meet the United States Army Air Corps (USAAC) request for a bomber that could carry 2,500 lb (1,100 kg) of bombs 5,000 mi (8,000 km; 4,300 nmi).

The XB-16 (Model 145A) was to use four Allison V-1710 liquid-cooled reciprocating V-engines; contemporary American aircraft used air-cooled radial engines.

In 1935, Martin revised the XB-16 design as the Model 145B. The wingspan was increased from 140 ft (43 m) to 173 ft (53 m), and a set of V-1710 engines added to the trailing edge. This version had a wingspan 20% greater than that of the B-29 Superfortress, the first operational bomber that would fill the role intended for the XB-16.

The XB-16 was canceled for essentially the same reason that the Boeing XB-15 project was, as it was not fast enough to meet the requirements set by the Army. Since both were canceled around the same time, Martin did not have time to produce an XB-16.

== Specifications (Model 145A) ==
Data from U.S. bombers, 1928 to 1980s

General characteristics

- Crew: ten
- Length: 114 ft 10 in (35 m)
- Wingspan: 140 ft (43 m)
  Model 145B: 173 ft (53 m)
- Gross weight: 65,000 lb (29,484 kg)
  Model 145B: 104,880 lb (47,570 kg)
- Fuel capacity: 4,238 US gal (16,040 L; 3,529 imp gal)
- Powerplant: 4 × Allison V-1710-3 V-12 liquid-cooled piston engines, 1,000 hp (750 kW) each (Model 145B ×6)

Performance

- Maximum speed: 237 mph (381 km/h, 206 kn) at 20,000 ft (6,100 m)
- Cruise speed: 140 mph (230 km/h, 120 kn)
- Range: 5,000 mi (8,000 km, 4,300 nmi)
- Combat range: 3,200 mi (5,100 km, 2,800 nmi) with 12,180 lb (5,520 kg) of bombs
- Endurance: 18 hours
- Service ceiling: 22,500 ft (6,900 m)
- Rate of climb: 740 ft/min (3.8 m/s)
- Power/mass: 0.049 hp/lb (0.080 kW/kg)

Armament

- Bombs: 12,180 lb (5,520 kg) of bombs

== See also ==
Aircraft of comparable role, configuration, and era

- Boeing XB-15
- Boeing Y1B-20
- Douglas XB-19

Related lists

- List of bomber aircraft
- List of military aircraft of the United States
