= Douglas XB-19 =

American bomber prototype

XB-19
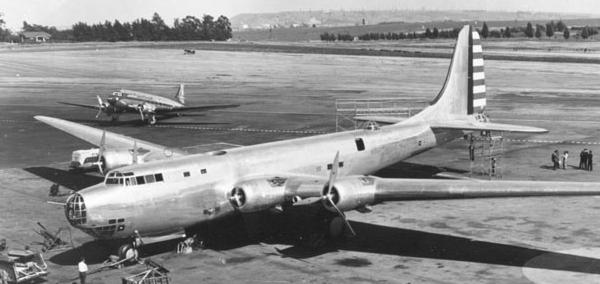

General information
- Type: Heavy bomber
- National origin: United States
- Manufacturer: Douglas Aircraft Company
- Status: Scrapped
- Primary user: United States Army Air Corps
- Number built: 1

History
- First flight: 27 June 1941
- Retired: 17 August 1946

The Douglas XB-19 was a four-engined, piston-driven heavy bomber produced by the Douglas Aircraft Company for the United States Army Air Forces (USAAF) during the early 1940s. The design was originally given the designation XBLR-2 (XBLR denoting "Experimental Bomber, Long Range"). It was the largest bomber built for the USAAF until 1946, with the Convair B-36 surpassing it in size.

== Design and development ==
The XB-19 project was intended to test flight characteristics and design techniques for giant bombers. Despite advances in technology that made the XB-19 obsolete before it was completed, the Army Air Corps believed the prototype would be useful for testing despite Douglas Aircraft wanting to cancel the expensive project. (Note: The cost of the project was at $4,033,801.61 in 1941.) Its construction took so long that competition for the contracts to build the XB-35 and XB-36 occurred two months before its first flight.

The plane first flew on 27 June 1941, more than three years after the construction contract was awarded. It was based at Wright Field from January to November 1942. (Note: While there, it took part in tests to measure noise levels inside aircraft.) In 1943, the Wright R-3350 engines were replaced with liquid-cooled W24 Allison V-3420-11 by the aircraft division of Fisher Body in support of the XB-39 project. As part of the program, it was equipped with engine driven auxiliary powerplants. After completion of testing, the XB-19 was earmarked for conversion into a cargo aircraft, but modifications were not completed, and the aircraft flew for the last time on 17 August 1946. It was eventually scrapped at Tucson in June 1949.

== Surviving artifacts ==
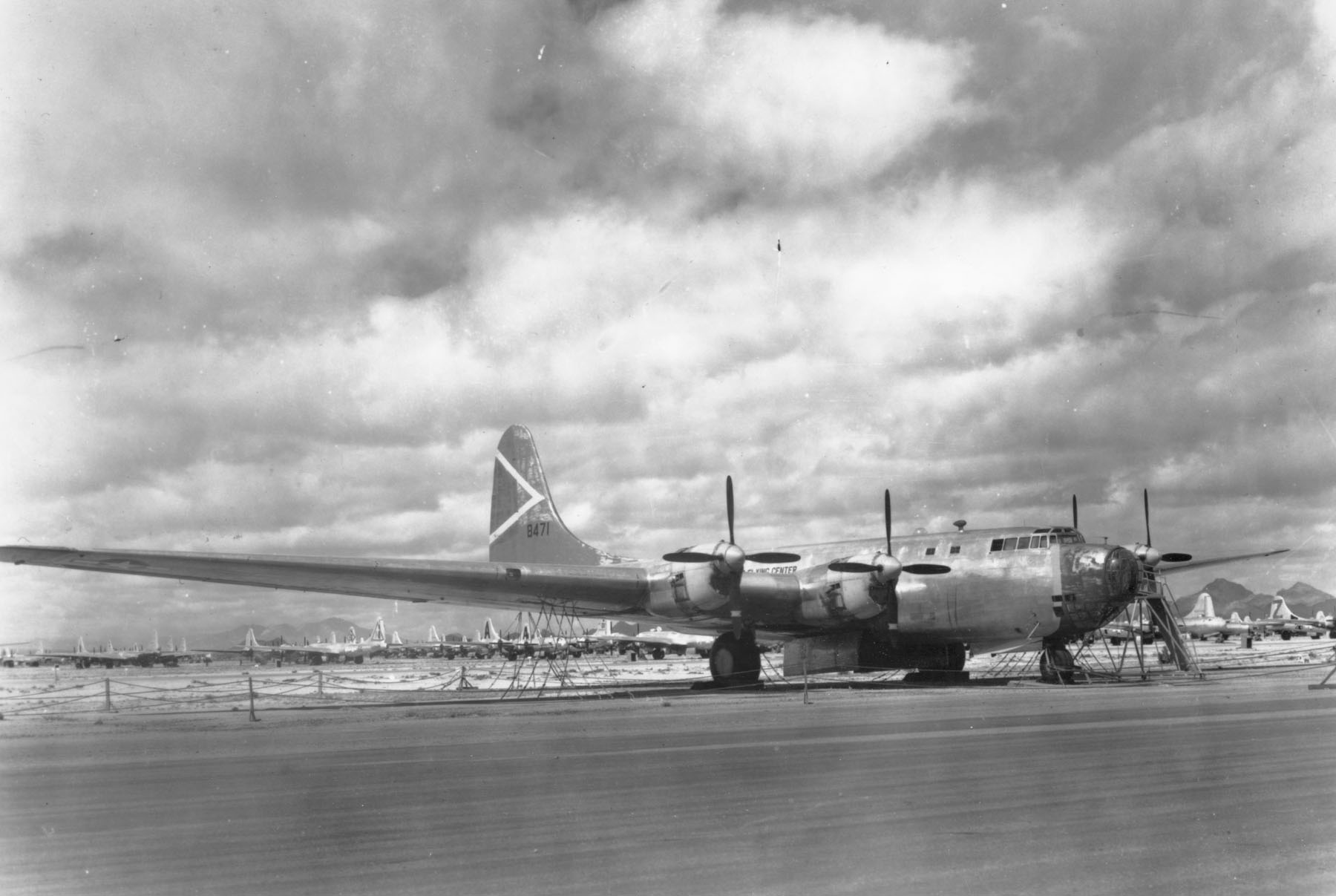
XB-19A at Davis-Monthan Air Force Base before scrapping.

The new U.S. Air Force had plans to save the XB-19 for eventual display, but in 1949 the Air Force did not have a program to save historic aircraft and the Air Force Museum had not yet been built. The XB-19 was therefore scrapped, but two of its enormous main tires were saved. (Note: The tires measured 96 inches in diameter.)

== Specifications (XB-19) ==
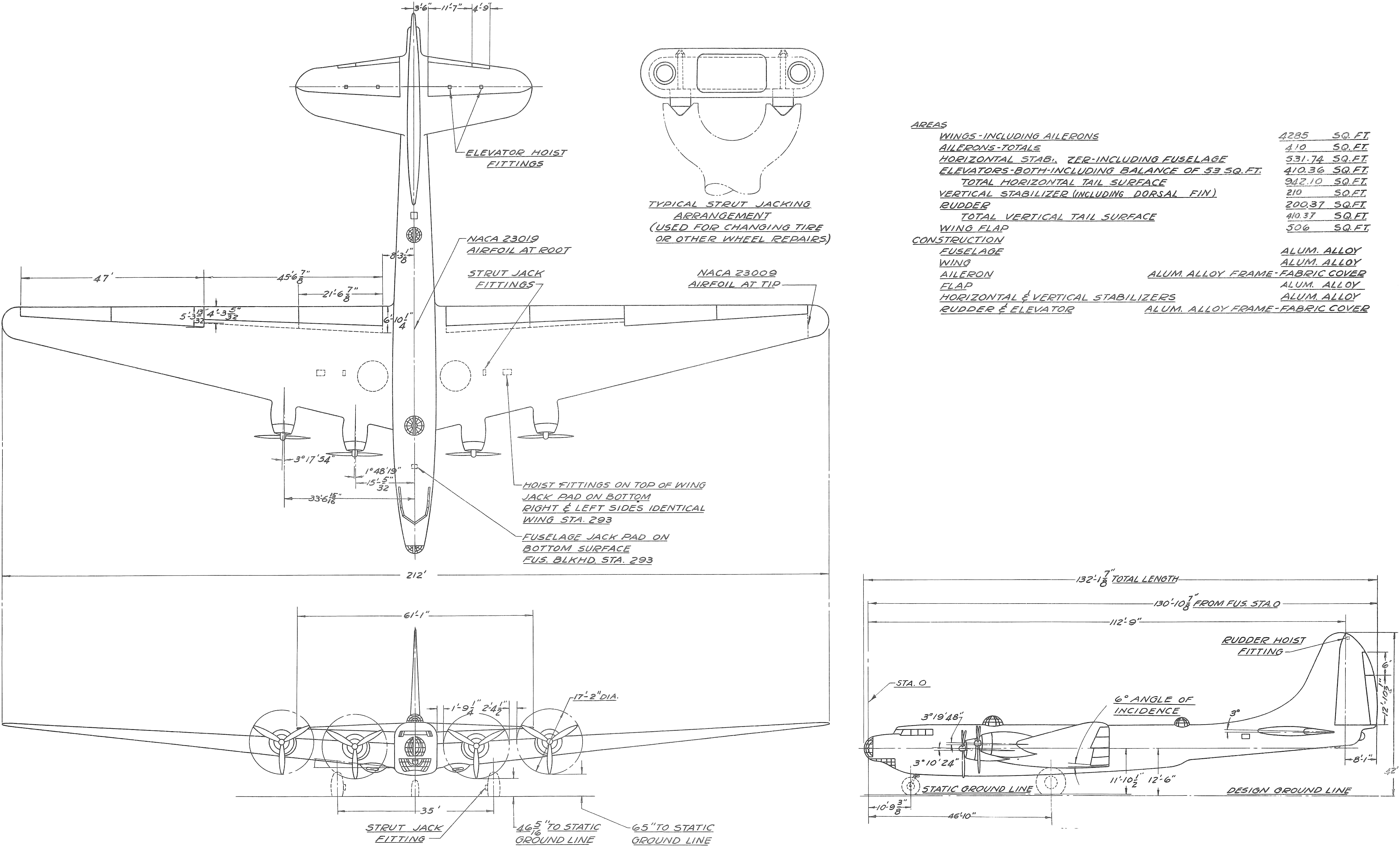
3-view line drawing of the Douglas XB-19

Data from McDonnell Douglas aircraft since 1920: Volume I

General characteristics

- Crew: 16 combat crew, with provision for 2 additional flight mechanics and six-man relief crew
- Length: 132 ft 4 in (40.34 m)
- Wingspan: 212 ft 0 in (64.62 m)
- Height: 42 ft 0 in (12.80 m)
- Wing area: 4,285 sq ft (398.1 m^{2})
- Empty weight: 86,000 lb (39,009 kg)
- Gross weight: 140,000 lb (63,503 kg)
- Max takeoff weight: 162,000 lb (73,482 kg)
- Fuel capacity: 10,350 US gal (8,620 imp gal; 39,200 L) internals with optional auxiliary tanks of 824 US gal (686 imp gal; 3,120 L) capacity
- Powerplant: 4 × Wright R-3350-5 Duplex Cyclone 18-cylinder air-cooled radial piston engines, 2,000 hp (1,500 kW) each (Note: XB-19A later fitted with 4x 2,600 hp (1,900 kW) Allison V-3420-11 24-cylinder engines)
- Propellers: 3-bladed constant-speed metal propellers, 17 ft 0 in (5.18 m) diameter

Performance

- Maximum speed: 224 mph (360 km/h, 195 kn) at 15,700 ft (4,800 m)
- Cruise speed: 135 mph (217 km/h, 117 kn)
- Range: 5,200 mi (8,400 km, 4,500 nmi)
- Ferry range: 7,710 mi (12,410 km, 6,700 nmi) with auxiliary tanks fitted
- Service ceiling: 23,000 ft (7,000 m)
- Rate of climb: 650 ft/min (3.3 m/s)
- Wing loading: 32.6 lb/sq ft (159 kg/m^{2})
- Power/mass: 0.057 hp/lb (0.094 kW/kg)

Armament

- Guns:

- 5 × 0.5 in (12.70 mm) M2 Browning machine guns
- 6 × 0.3 in (7.62 mm) M1919 Browning machine guns
- 2 × 37 mm (1.457 in) M4 autocannon

- Bombs: 18,700 lb (8,500 kg) internal; maximum bomb load of 37,100 lb (16,800 kg) including external racks with reduced fuel load

== See also ==
Aircraft of comparable role, configuration, and era

- Boeing XB-15
- Boeing Y1B-20
- Sikorsky XBLR-3

Related lists

- List of bomber aircraft
- List of aircraft of World War II
- List of military aircraft of the United States
