= Boeing XB-39 Superfortress =

Prototype bomber aircraft by Boeing

XB-39 Superfortress
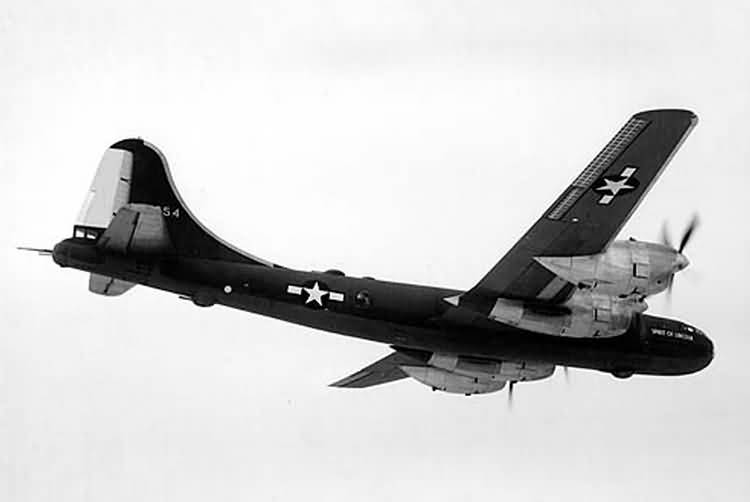
- Boeing XB-39 serial number: 41-36954

General information
- Type: Heavy bomber
- Manufacturer: Boeing
- Primary user: United States Army Air Forces
- Number built: 1

History
- Manufactured: 1944
- First flight: 9 December 1944
- Developed from: Boeing B-29 Superfortress

The Boeing XB-39 Superfortress was a United States prototype bomber aircraft, a single example of the B-29 Superfortress converted to fly with alternative powerplants. It was intended to demonstrate that the B-29 could still be put into service even if the first choice of engine, the air-cooled Wright R-3350 radial engine, ran into development or production difficulties.

== Design and development ==
Starting life as the first YB-29 delivered to the United States Army Air Forces, it was sent in November 1943 to the Fisher Body Aircraft Development Section of General Motors to be converted to use Allison V-3420-17 liquid-cooled W24 (twin-V12, common crankcase) inline engines. Fisher was chosen for the modification as it was familiar with the engine, as it was to power the P-75 Eagle that they were then developing. Testing on it began in early 1944.

Further development of the engine and the aircraft was delayed by a series of changes in the planned turbosuperchargers, as the originally specified GE Type CM-2 two-stage turbosupercharger became unavailable due to demands on GE's production of its other turbosuperchargers. Other turbosuperchargers were considered, but the result was that the first flights of the XB-39 had to be made without any turbosuperchargers at all.

== Operational history ==
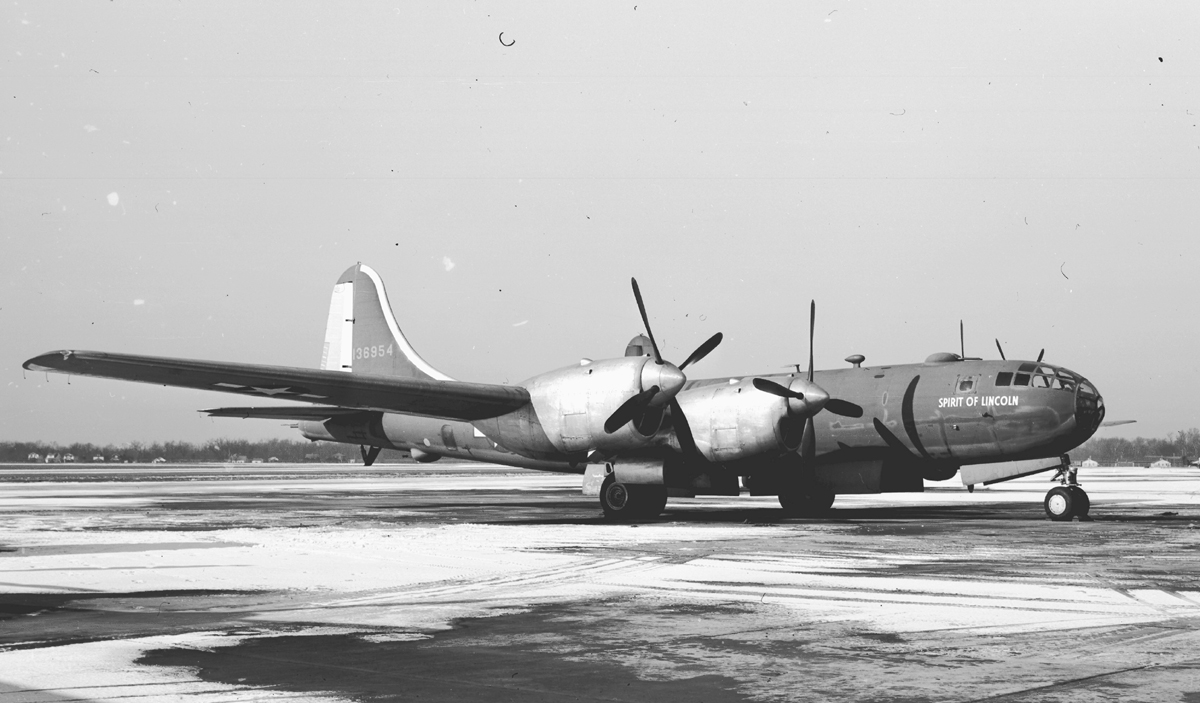
General Motors modified B-29 to use Allison V-3420 engines

Fisher finally focused again on the B-39. The first flight of the B-39 was made on 9 December 1944 at Cleveland, Ohio. The initial flight tests of the B-39, without turbosuperchargers installed, were impressive. However, the B-39 program was by now seriously delayed, and the flawed R-3350 B-29s had already been rushed into combat in June 1944.

Despite continuing problems with the B-29s, the aircraft was functioning well enough in combat that it no longer made any sense to shift resources in the manufacturing base to a new engine for the B-29 and so the B-39 was not ordered into production.

== Specifications (XB-39) ==
General characteristics

- Crew: 10: pilot, co-pilot, flight engineer, bombardier, navigator, radio operator, side gunners (two), top gunner, and tail gunner
- Length: 99 ft 0 in (30.18 m)
- Wingspan: 141 ft 3 in (43.05 m)
- Height: 27 ft 9 in (8.46 m)
- Wing area: 1,736 sq ft (161.3 m^{2})
- Empty weight: 74,500 lb (33,800 kg)
- Gross weight: 120,000 lb (54,000 kg)
- Max takeoff weight: 133,500 lb (60,560 kg)
- Powerplant: 4 × Allison V-3420-11 liquid-cooled W24 (double-vee) engines, 2,100 hp (1,600 kW) each

Performance

- Maximum speed: 405 mph (648 km/h, 351 kn)
- Range: 6,290 mi (10,060 km, 5,460 nmi)
- Service ceiling: 35,000 ft (11,000 m)
- Wing loading: 69.12 lb/sq ft (337.5 kg/m^{2})
- Power/mass: 0.073 hp/lb (121 W/kg)

Armament

- Guns:
  - 8× .50 in (12.7 mm) Browning AN/M2 machine guns in remote controlled turrets
  - 2× .50 in (12.7 mm) AN/M2 machine guns in manually-operated tail turret
  - 1× 20 mm (0.787 in) AN/M2 cannon in tail turret
- Bombs: 20,000 lb (9,000 kg)

== See also ==
Related development

- Boeing B-29 Superfortress
- Boeing B-50 Superfortress

Related lists

- List of bomber aircraft
- List of military aircraft of the United States
