= Boeing Y1B-20 =

American bomber project

General information
- Type: Heavy bomber
- Manufacturer: Boeing
- Status: Cancelled
- Primary user: United States Army Air Forces
- Number built: 0

History
- First flight: n/a
- Developed from: Boeing XB-15

The Boeing Y1B-20 (Boeing 316) was designed as an improvement on the Boeing XB-15. (Note: Y1- indicates a funding source outside normal fiscal year procurement.) It was slightly larger than its predecessor, and was intended to use much more powerful engines. It was presented to the Army in early 1938, and two orders were placed soon after. The order was reversed before construction began.

Despite their cancellation, the XB-15 and Y1B-20 laid the groundwork for the Boeing B-29 Superfortress.

== Specifications (as designed) ==
General characteristics

- Crew: 10
- Length: 109 ft 2 in (33.3 m)
- Wingspan: 157 ft 0 in (47.8 m)
- Height: 23 ft 4 in (7.1 m)
- Empty weight: 87,500 lb (39,700 kg)
- Gross weight: 91,500 lb (41,500 kg)
- Max takeoff weight: 105,100 lb (47,700 kg)
- Powerplant: 4 × Wright GR-2600-A73 geared radials, 1,350 hp (1,000 kW) each

Performance

- Maximum speed: 258 mph (415 km/h, 224 kn)
- Cruise speed: 242 mph (389 km/h, 210 kn)
- Range: 4,000 mi (6,400 km, 3,500 nmi)
- Power/mass: 0.059 hp/lb (97 W/kg)

Armament

- Guns:
  - 3× .30 in (7.62 mm) machine guns
  - 4× .50 in (12.7 mm) machine guns
- Bombs: 17,600 lb (6,620 kg)

== See also ==
Related development

- Boeing XB-15

Aircraft of comparable role, configuration, and era

- Douglas XB-19
- Martin XB-16
- B-29 Superfortress

Related lists

- List of bomber aircraft
- List of military aircraft of the United States
