= Boeing XB-15 =

Prototype bomber aircraft by Boeing

XB-15
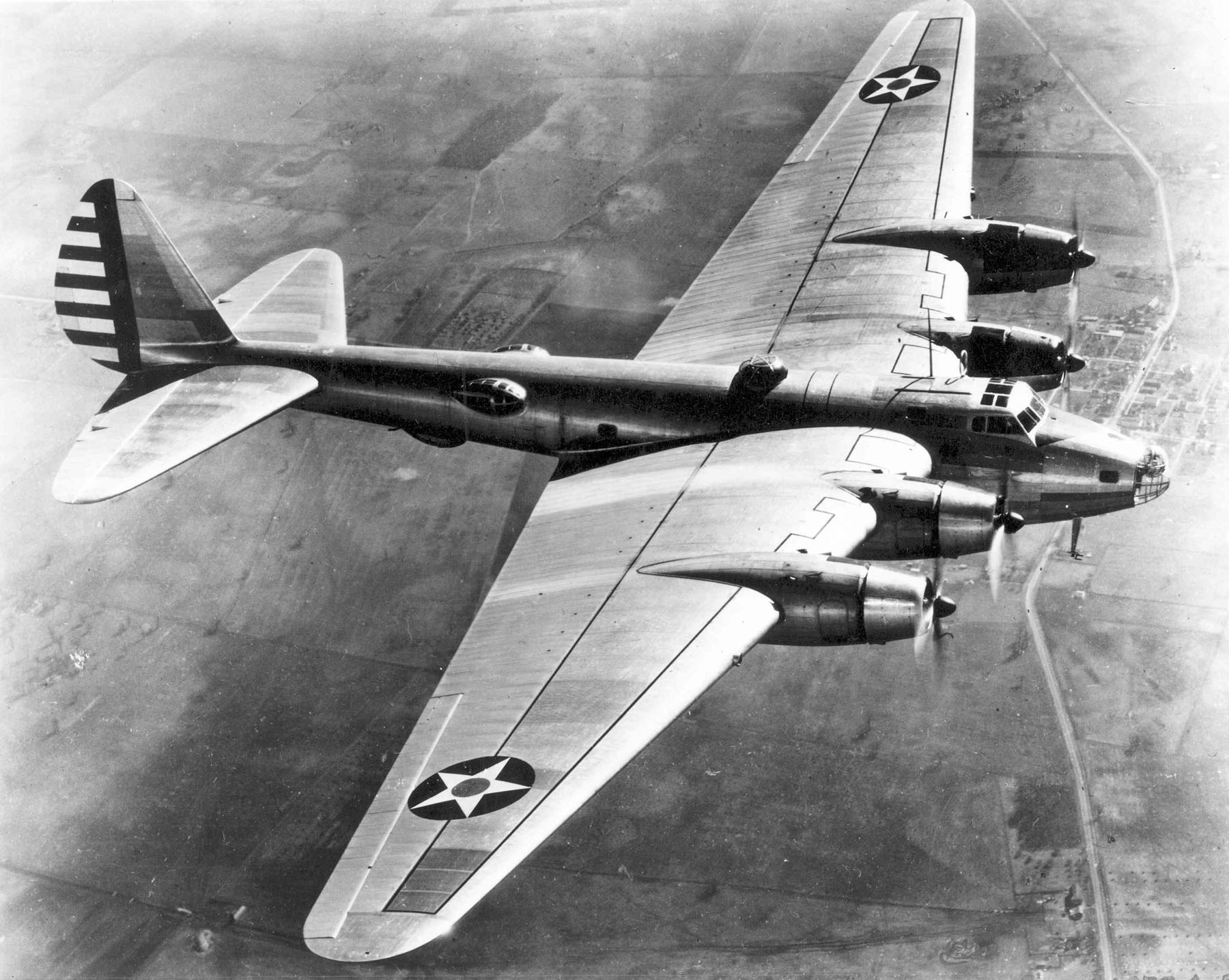
- XB-15 on a test flight

General information
- Type: Heavy bomber
- Manufacturer: Boeing
- Status: Canceled
- Primary user: United States Army Air Corps
- Number built: 1 prototype

History
- First flight: 15 October 1937
- Developed into: Boeing Y1B-20

The Boeing XB-15 (Boeing 294) was a United States bomber aircraft designed in 1934 as a test for the United States Army Air Corps (USAAC) to see if it would be possible to build a heavy bomber with a 5,000 mi (4,300 nmi; 8,000 km) range. For a year beginning in mid-1935 it was designated the XBLR-1. When it first flew in 1937, it was the most massive and voluminous airplane ever built in the US. It set a number of load-to-altitude records for land-based aircraft, including carrying a 31,205 lb (14,154 kg) payload to 8,200 ft (2,500 m) on 30 July 1939.

The aircraft's immense size allowed flight engineers to enter the wing through a crawlway and make minor repairs in flight. A 5,000 mi (4,300 nmi; 8,000 km) flight took 33 hours at its 152 mph (132 kn; 245 km/h) cruising speed; the crew was made up of several shifts, and bunks allowed them to sleep when off duty.

== Design and development ==
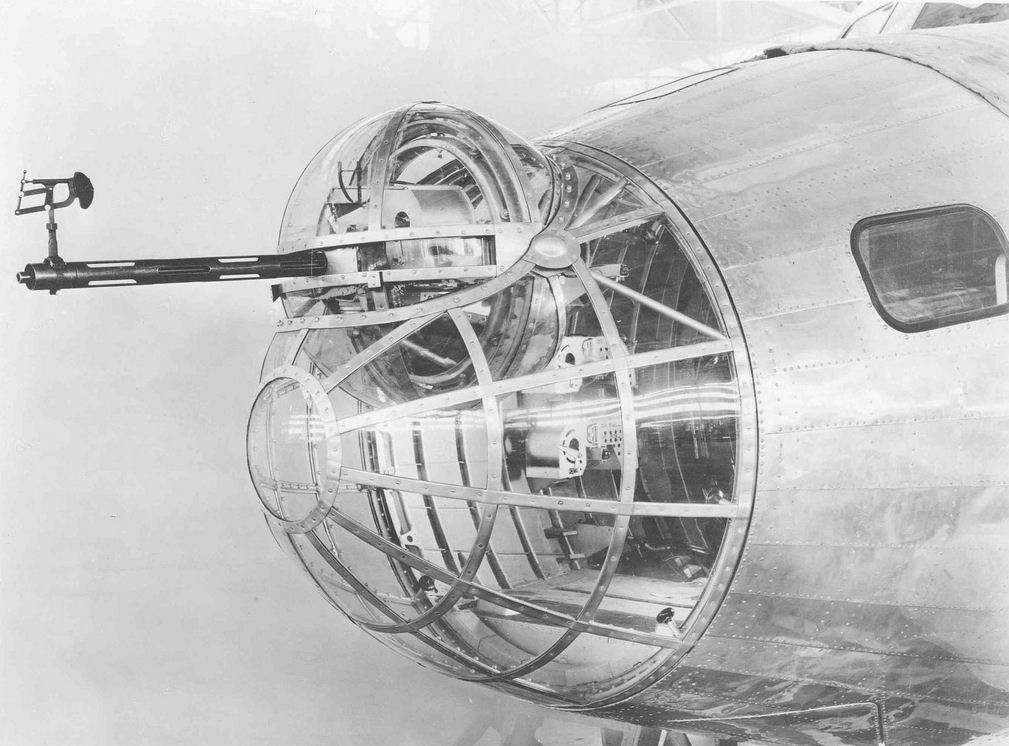
The XB-15's .50 in (12.7 mm) front gun turret

The specification that produced the XB-15 began in mid-1933 as "Project A", USAAC discussions regarding the possibility of flying a very large bomber with a range of 5,000 mi (8,000 km). In April 1934, the USAAC contracted with Boeing and Martin to design a bomber capable of carrying 2,000 lb (910 kg) at 200 mph (320 km/h) over a distance of 5,000 miles. Boeing gave the project the internal name of Model 294, while the USAAC called it the XB-15. Martin's design, the XB-16, was judged inferior by the USAAC before a prototype was built, and was canceled.

The Boeing design team, headed by Jack Kylstra, initially intended the aircraft to use 1,000 hp (750 kW) liquid-cooled engines but these were still in development. The 850 hp (630 kW) Pratt & Whitney R-1830 Twin Wasp air-cooled radial engines were used instead.

Starting in August 1934, Boeing began designing the Model 299 in answer to a proposal by the USAAC to replace the Martin B-10 bomber. The Model 299 design team incorporated elements of the Boeing 247 and the Model 294, especially its use of four engines. The Model 299 design team worked alongside Klystra's team, but difficulties in fabricating such a large aircraft slowed progress on the 294. The Model 299 flew first, on 28 July 1935.

In mid-1935, the USAAC combined Project A with Project D; a proposal asking for "the maximum feasible range into the future." The combined program was designated BLR for "Bomber, Long Range". The XB-15 was renamed the XBLR-1; it was joined under the BLR program by two other projects: one from Douglas Aircraft, the XBLR-2 which later became the XB-19; and one from Sikorsky Aircraft called the XBLR-3, later canceled. The next year, the XBLR designation was dropped and the Boeing prototype was once again the XB-15.

Unusual features that the XB-15 pioneered included an autopilot, deicing equipment, and two gasoline generators used as auxiliary power units (independent of the main engines) to power the 110-volt electrical system. The main engines were serviceable in flight using an access tunnel inside the wing. The aircraft contained a sizable crew compartment with bunkbeds, a galley and a lavatory. Finally, in September 1937, construction was finished, and it first flew on 15 October. Its double-wheel main landing gear remained down from takeoff to landing. On 2 December 1937, the XB-15 flew from Seattle to Wright Field in Ohio to be accepted by the USAAC for testing.

With the Twin Wasp radial engines installed—the same number and type of engines fitted to the later Consolidated B-24 Liberator, with individual turbochargers added on the Liberators' Twin Wasp powerplants—the specified speed of 200 mph (320 km/h) for the Twin Wasp-powered XB-15 was not quite reached even when the aircraft was empty; the best speed attained in level flight was 197 mph (317 km/h). Loaded with the specified 2,000 pounds (910 kg), the maximum speed was a disappointing 145 mph (233 km/h). This was considered too slow for a combat aircraft, and the project was abandoned. However, Boeing engineers projected that the prototype would be capable of carrying the heaviest air cargo to date: a load of 8,000 lb (3,600 kg).

The design challenges stemming from the great size of the XB-15 were difficult to master, but the lessons learned by Boeing were later applied to the Model 314 flying boat, which essentially used the XB-15's wing design with four of the more powerful Wright Twin Cyclone fourteen-cylinder radials for power. In 1938, the USAAC proposed to update the XB-15 to make the slightly larger Y1B-20, again using four Wright Twin Cyclones as with the Boeing 314, but the Secretary of War, Harry Hines Woodring, canceled the project before construction began, in favor of the expensive Douglas XB-19. Boeing went ahead with an internal redesign of the XB-15 called Model 316, a very heavy bomber with a high wing, a pressurized cabin and tricycle gear. The Model 316 was not built. The progression of design work starting with the XB-15 finally bore fruit with the Model 345 presented to the USAAC in May 1940, the very heavy bomber which resulted in the USAAF's Boeing B-29 Superfortress.

== Operational history ==
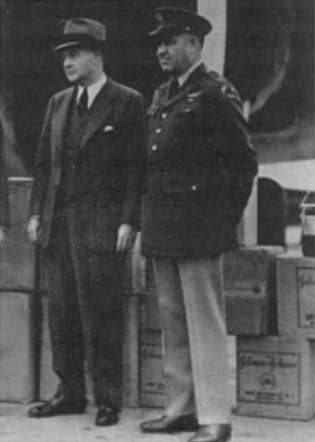
A Red Cross agent and Major Caleb V. Haynes supervise the loading of emergency medical supplies on the XB-15 in early 1939

The single prototype was assigned to the 2nd Bombardment Group at Langley Field, Virginia. Following the 24 January 1939 Chillán earthquake in Chile, the prototype flew a relief mission, carrying medical supplies. Commanded by Major Caleb V. Haynes, the aircraft carried 3,250 lb (1,470 kg) of American Red Cross emergency supplies to Santiago, making only two stops along the way, at France Field in the Panama Canal Zone, and at Lima, Peru. Haynes was awarded the Distinguished Flying Cross and the Order of the Merit of Chile, and the whole crew earned the MacKay Trophy.

Haynes piloted the XB-15 again on 10 June 1939 to return home the body of Mexican flier Francisco Sarabia who had died in a crash in the Potomac River. After flying back from Mexico City, Haynes and his copilot William D. Old undertook flight tests at Wright Field with heavy loads. The XB-15 lifted a 22,046-pound (10,000 kg) payload to a height of 8,228 feet (2,508 m), and 31,164 pounds (14,136 kg) to 6,561.6 feet (2,000.0 m), setting two world records for landplanes. Haynes was awarded certificates issued by the National Aeronautics Association (NAA) for an international record for "the greatest payload carried to an altitude of 2,000 meters [6,562 feet]." The XB-15 was not fast for a bomber but it was the fastest aircraft that could carry so much weight, and for such distances. In July 1939, Haynes received certificates from the NAA for an international 5,000 km (3,107 mi) speed record with a 2,000 kg (4,409 lb) payload. The latter performance also established a national closed circuit distance record of 3,129.241 miles (5,036.025 km).

Flying from Langley, the XB-15 arrived at Albrook Field in Panama on 10 April 1940 and immediately began classified bombing tests of canal lock protections, commanded by Haynes and including Captain Curtis LeMay as navigator and Lieutenant John B. Montgomery as bombardier. Of 150 bombs dropped, only three hit the target: a specially made bunker simulating a reinforced machine room. The few hits nevertheless led to improvements in bunker design. In early May, Haynes and LeMay made a survey flight from Panama over the Galapagos islands, the inspection including Baltra Island. Haynes piloted the XB-15 back to the United States, leaving Panama on 11 May 1940.

In late 1940, the XB-15's defensive guns were removed at Duncan Field in Texas. Seats were attached so that Lend Lease aircraft ferry crews could be returned after delivery.

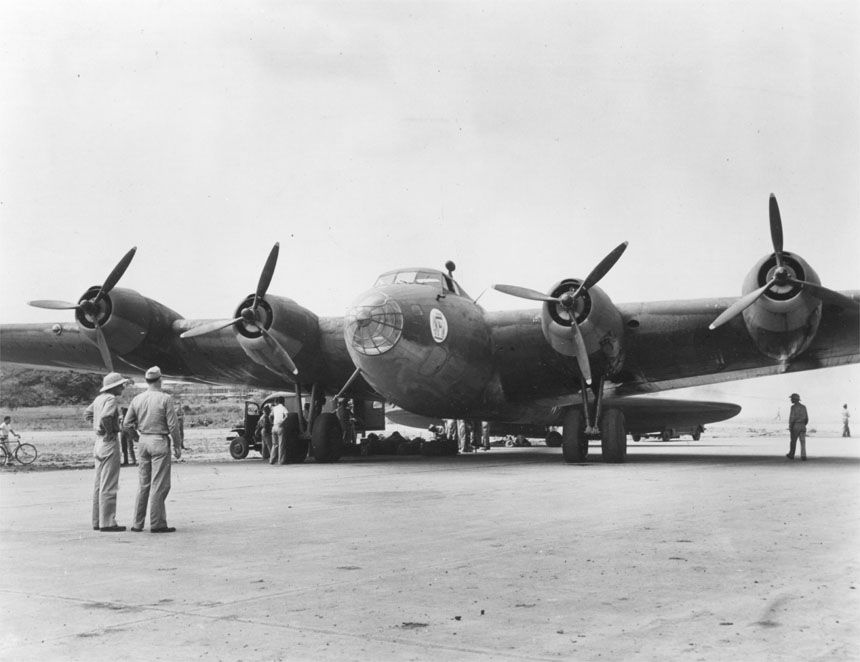
XC-105 "Grandpappy" in Panama

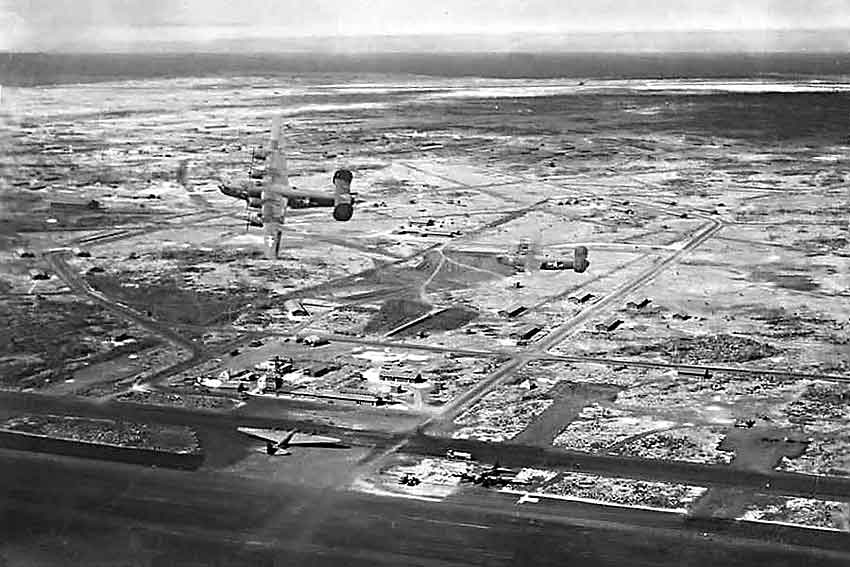
The XC-105 parked on Baltra Island in the Galápagos. Flying above are two Consolidated B-24 Liberators.

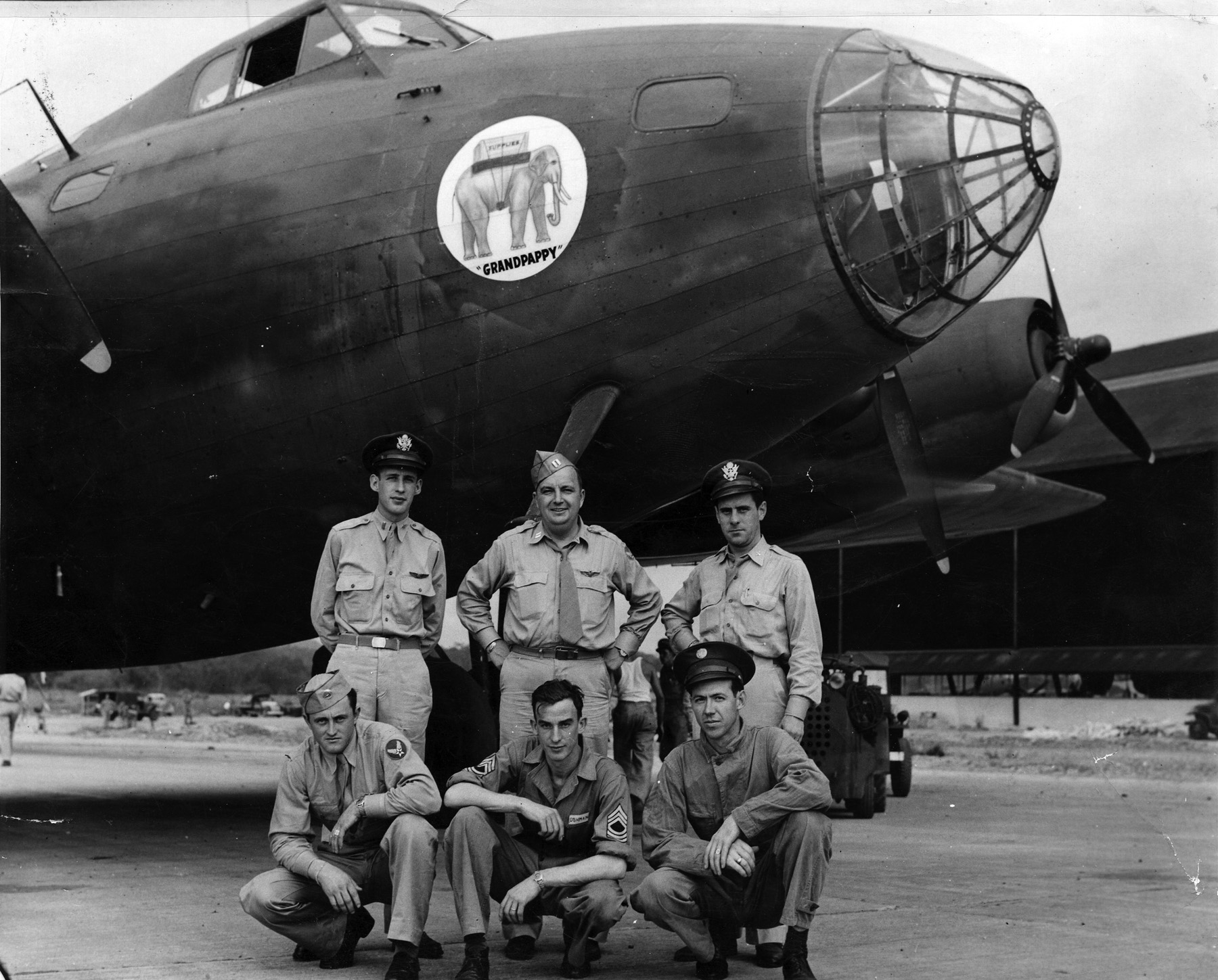
The flight crew in front of "Grandpappy" in Panama in 1943. Note the absence of the nose gun.

=== Cargo aircraft ===
On 6 May 1943, the Army Air Forces converted the only prototype into a transport, the aircraft being redesignated XC-105. A cargo hoist was mounted, and cargo doors fitted. Its maximum gross weight was increased to 92,000 lb (42,000 kg). By this time, the aircraft was nicknamed "Grandpappy" by 20th Troop Carrier Squadron airmen. It displayed nose art depicting an elephant carrying a large crate on its back labeled "supplies". During World War II, the XC-105 carried freight and personnel to and from Florida, and throughout the Caribbean, based at Albrook Field beginning in June 1943. Hundreds of young women were flown in "Grandpappy" from Miami to the Canal Zone to engage in US government work; these trips were dubbed the "Georgia Peach Run". "Grandpappy" traveled to the Galapagos, landing on Baltra Island at the same airfield built following the XB-15 aerial survey of May 1940.

"Grandpappy′s" flight crew, reduced to six men, described the aircraft as difficult to fly and service. Two fires and a complete failure of the electrical system occurred in the air. The aircraft was retired on 18 December 1944, assigned to Panama Air Depot. In June 1945, it was ordered to be scrapped at Albrook Field in Panama, its engines and internal parts removed along with its vertical stabilizer and rudder. The remaining airframe was deposited at Diablo dump, a swampy landfill southwest of the runway, where it slowly sank from sight. Squatters built shacks on stilts in the swamp, covering the remains. The former dump is now an industrial area, with "Grandpappy" underneath.

During its 18 months of transport service, the XC-105 carried more than 5,200 passengers, 440,000 lb (200,000 kg) of cargo and 94,000 lb (43,000 kg) of mail. It flew 70 cargo trips and 60 missions including anti-submarine patrol. Unusually, the aircraft was consistently referred to as "he" by its crew.

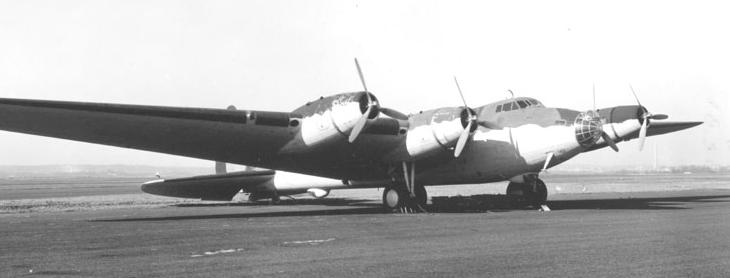
The XB-15 parked on an airstrip.

== Operators ==
United States

- United States Army Air Corps

2d Bombardment Group

- United States Army Air Forces

20th Troop Carrier Squadron

== Specifications (XB-15) ==
Data from Boeing Aircraft since 1916.

General characteristics

- Crew: 10
- Length: 87 ft 7 in (26.70 m)
- Wingspan: 149 ft 0 in (45.43 m)
- Height: 25 ft 10 in (7.87 m)
- Wing area: 2,780 sq ft (258.4 m^{2})
- Airfoil: root: NACA 0018; tip: NACA 0010
- Empty weight: 37,709 lb (17,141 kg)
- Max takeoff weight: 70,706 lb (32,139 kg)
- Powerplant: 4 × 14-cylinder Pratt & Whitney R-1830-11 radial engines, 1,000 hp (634 kW) each

Performance

- Maximum speed: 197 mph (317 km/h, 171 kn) at 5,000 ft (1,500 m)
- Cruise speed: 152 mph (245 km/h, 132 kn) at 6,000 ft (1,800 m)
- Range: 5,130 mi (8,260 km, 4,460 nmi)
- Combat range: 3,400 mi (5,474 km, 2,957 nmi)
- Service ceiling: 18,900 ft (5,760 m)

Armament

- Guns:
  - 3 × .30 in (7.62 mm) M1919 Browning machine guns
  - 3 × .50 in (12.7 mm) M2 Browning machine guns
- Bombs: 12,000 lb (5,400 kg)

== See also ==
Related development

- Boeing B-17 Flying Fortress
- Boeing Y1B-20
- Boeing 314, which used the XB-15's wing design

Aircraft of comparable role, configuration, and era

- Martin XB-16
- Petlyakov Pe-8
- Nakajima G5N

Related lists

- List of bomber aircraft
- List of military aircraft of the United States
