= Allison V-3420 =

Large experimental piston aircraft engine

V-3420
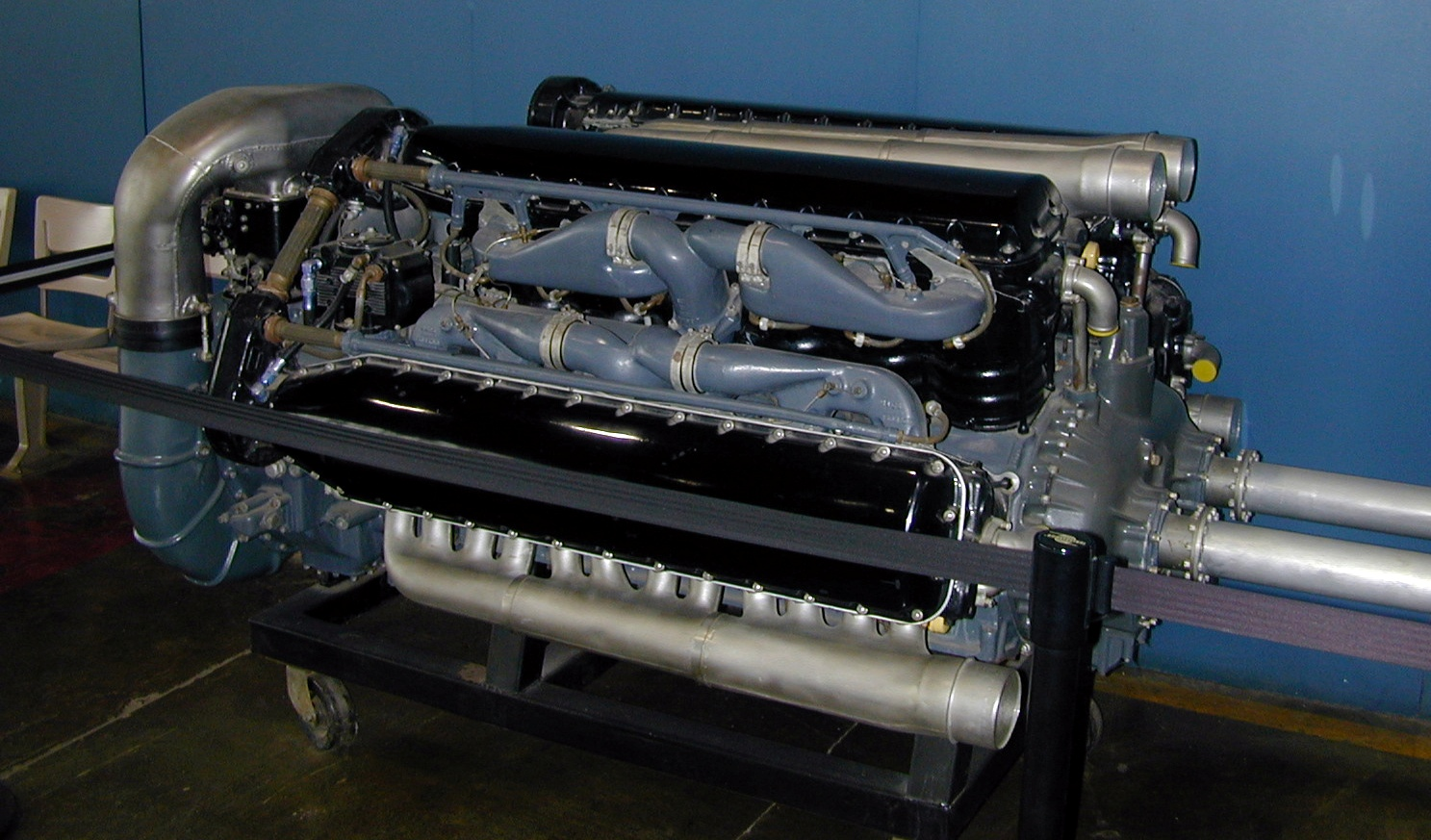
- Allison V-3420 Engine
- Type: Liquid-cooled W-24 piston engine
- National origin: United States
- Manufacturer: Allison Engine Company
- First run: 1937
- Major applications: Fisher P-75 Eagle
- Number built: 150
- Developed from: Allison V-1710

The Allison V-3420 was a large experimental piston aircraft engine, designed in 1937 by the American Allison Engine Company.

== Design and development ==
In 1937, at the behest of the United States Army Air Corps, the Allison Engine Company agreed to design and build a large-displacement high-power aircraft engine. The resulting V-3420 was essentially a pair of 12-cylinder Allison V-1710 engines mated to a common crankcase with a 30° angle between the inner cylinder banks. The crankshafts of the two V-1710 engines were geared together to drive a common propeller shaft. Most V-3420 parts were interchangeable with those for V-1710-E and -F engines.

The V-3420 had a power-to-weight ratio of 1.6 kW/kg or 1 hp/lb, excellent for its time. It was envisioned as a powerful yet compact engine for several advanced USAAF projects of the day, including the Douglas XB-19, the Boeing XB-39 Superfortress, the Lockheed XP-58 Chain Lightning, and the Fisher P-75 Eagle. As none of these designs saw more than limited production, only about 150 V-3420s were built.

== Variants ==
V-3420-A16R (-11)
V-3420-A16L (-13)
left-hand rotation of propeller, single-stage supercharger with single-stage turbocharger and intercooler
V-3420-A18R (-17)
V-3420-A24
Supercharger ratio 7.2:1
V-3420-B (-23)
Similar to the -A but with mechanically driven supercharger in two variable-speed stages

== Applications ==
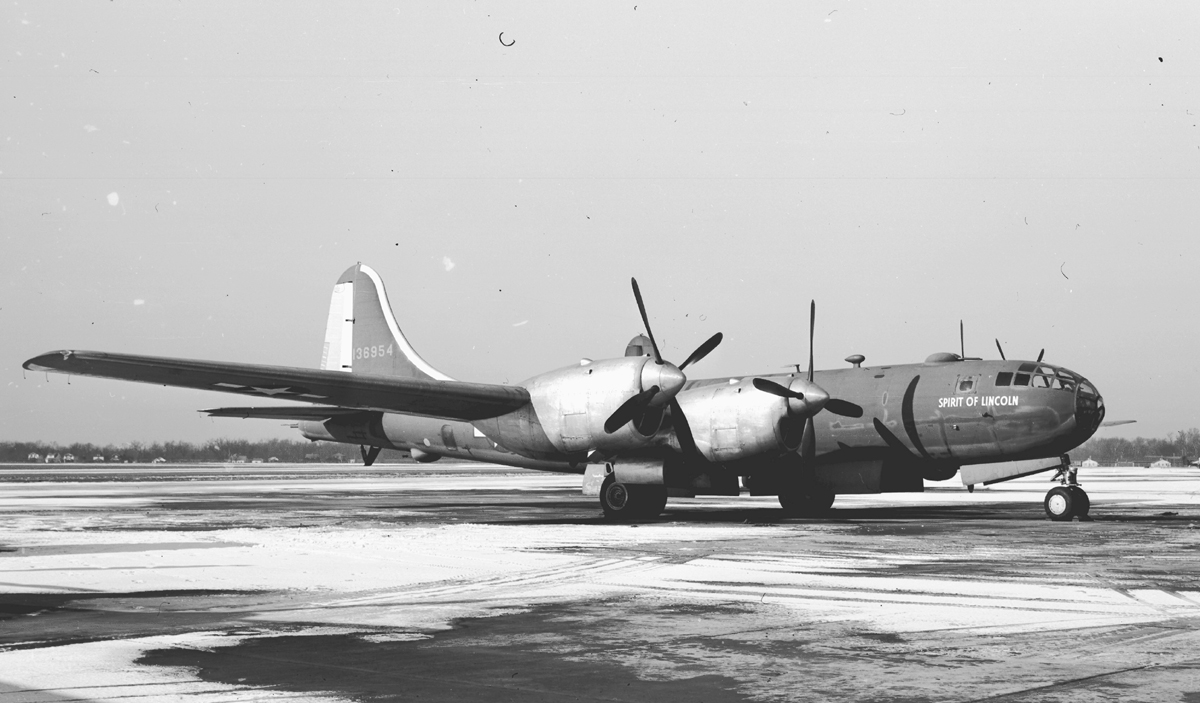
Boeing XB-39 Superfortress with V-3420 engines

- Boeing XB-39 Superfortress
- Douglas XB-19
- Fisher P-75 Eagle
- Lockheed XP-58 Chain Lightning

== Engines on display ==
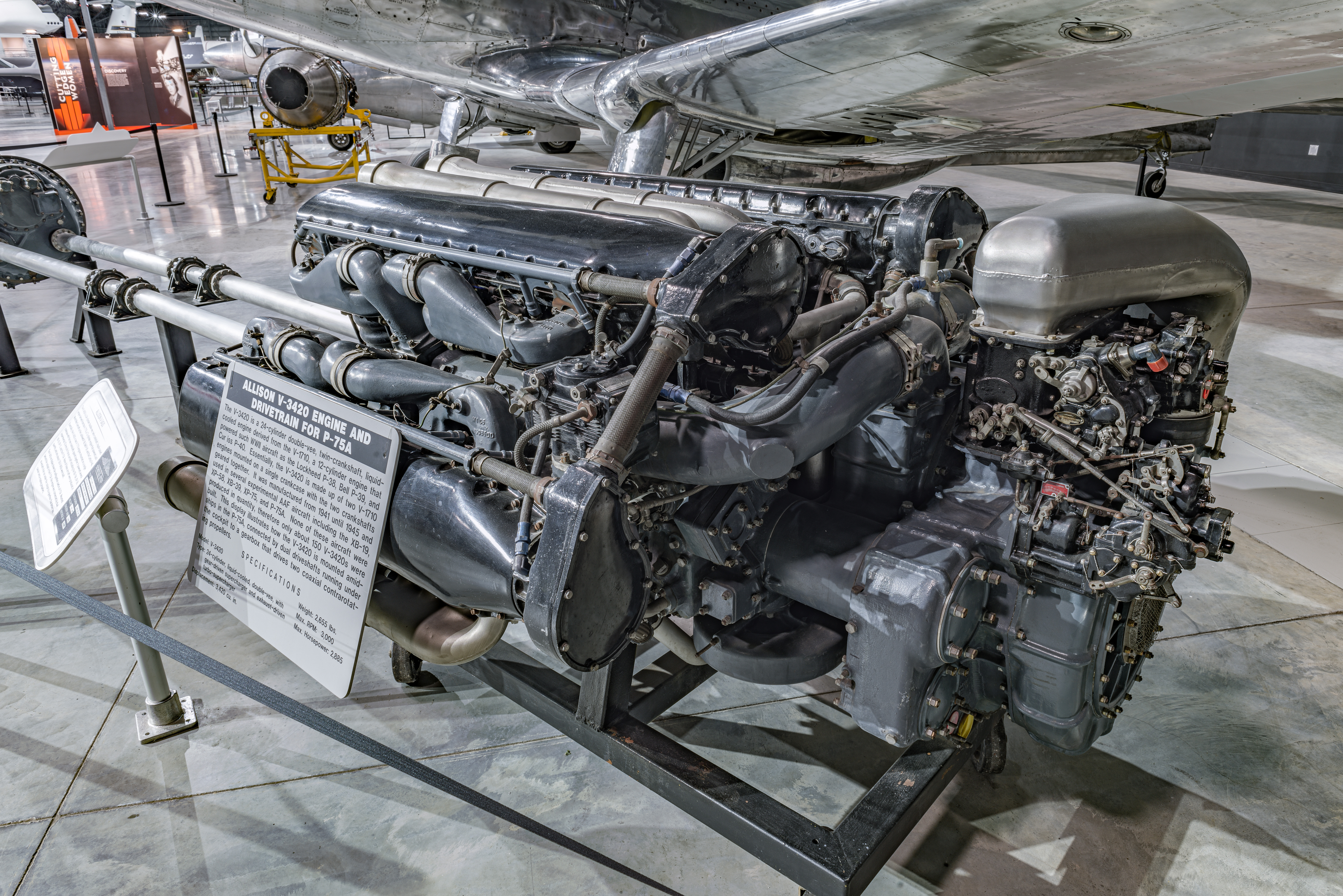
An Allison V-3420-23 engine at the National Museum of the Air Force in Dayton, Ohio

- A V-3420-23 (B10) is on public display at the Aerospace Museum of California in North Highlands, California.
- A V-3420 is on public display at the Glenn H. Curtiss Museum in Hammondsport, New York.
- A V-3420-23 engine is on public display at the National Museum of the United States Air Force in Dayton, Ohio alongside a Fisher P-75 Eagle

== Specifications (V-3420-A18R (-17)) ==
Data from Aircraft Engines of the World 1946

=== General characteristics ===
- Type: 24-cylinder twin-charged double-"Vee" liquid-cooled piston aircraft engine
- Bore: 5.5 in (139.7 mm)
- Stroke: 6 in (152.4 mm)
- Displacement: 3,420 in^{3} (56 L)
- Length: 97.7 in (2,482 mm)
- Width: 60.0 in (1,421 mm)
- Height: 38.7 in (863 mm)
- Dry weight: 2,655 lb (1,204 kg)

=== Components ===
- Valvetrain: Single overhead camshaft per 6-cylinder block, two intake and two exhaust valves per cylinder, sodium-cooled exhaust valves.
- Supercharger: Single-speed one-stage gear-driven supercharger
- Turbocharger: General Electric turbocharger with intercooler
- Fuel system: Bendix-Stromberg PR-58B3 three-barrel injection-type downdraught with automatic mixture control.
- Fuel type: 100/130 Octane
- Oil system: Pressure fed at 60–70 pounds per square inch (410–480 kPa)
- Cooling system: Liquid-cooled with a mixture of 70% water and 30% ethylene glycol, pressurized.

=== Performance ===
- Power output:

Take-off
2,600 hp (1,940 kW) at 3,000 rpm at 46.0 inHg / +8.0 Lb boost for 15 minutes
Military
2,600 hp (1,940 kW) at 3,000 rpm at 25,000 ft (7,625 m) for 15 minutes
Normal
2,100 hp (1,565 kW) at 2,600 rpm at 25,000 ft (7,625 m) maximum continuous power
Max. Cruising
1,575 hp (1,175 kW) at 2,300 rpm at 25,000 ft (7,625 m)

- Specific power: 0.76 hp/cu in (34.6 kW/L)
- Compression ratio: 6.65:1
- Specific fuel consumption: 0.41 lb/hp/hr (249.4 g/kW/hr)
- Oil consumption: 0.025 lb/hp/hr (15.2 g/kW/hr)
- Power-to-weight ratio: 1.0 hp/lb (1.64 kW/kg)

== See also ==
Related development

- Allison V-1710

Comparable engines

- Daimler-Benz DB 604
- Daimler-Benz DB 606
- Junkers Jumo 222
- Napier Sabre
- Rolls-Royce Vulture

Related lists

- List of aircraft engines
