= Fisher P-75 Eagle =

1943 fighter aircraft series by General Motors Fisher Body Division

P-75 Eagle
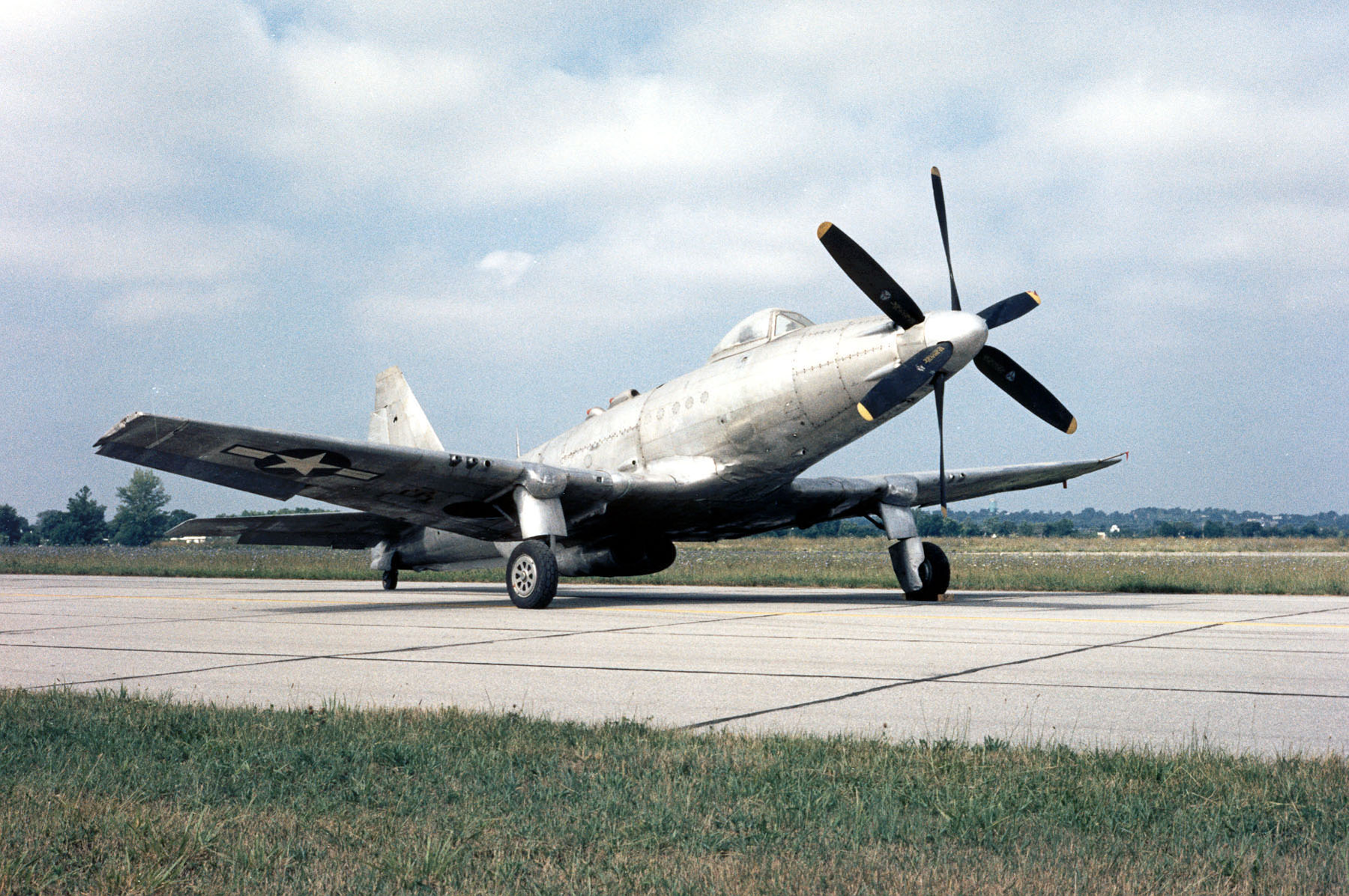
- The last production P-75A, now in the USAF Museum in Dayton, OH

General information
- Type: Fighter
- Manufacturer: Fisher Body Division of General Motors
- Status: Canceled 6 October 1944
- Primary user: United States Army Air Forces
- Number built: 14

History
- First flight: 17 November 1943

The Fisher P-75 Eagle is an American fighter aircraft designed by the Fisher Body Division of General Motors. Development started in September 1942 in response to United States Army Air Forces requirement for a fighter possessing an extremely high rate of climb, using the most powerful liquid-cooled engine then available, the Allison V-3420. The program was cancelled after only a small number of prototypes and production aircraft had been completed, as it was no longer required in its original role, could not be quickly deployed, and possessed no significant advantages over aircraft already in production.

== Design and development ==
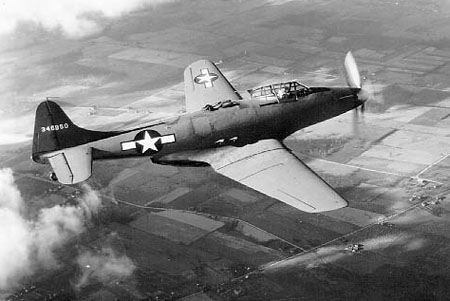
The first XP-75 in flight

In October 1942, the contract for two prototypes, designated "XP-75", was signed with the Fisher Body Division of GM. The design concept was to use the outer wing panels from the North American P-51 Mustang, the tail assembly from the Douglas A-24 (SBD), and the undercarriage from the Vought F4U Corsair in a general layout much as in the Bell P-39 Airacobra with the engine located amidships with the contra-rotating propellers driven through extension shafts. At an early design stage, however, Curtiss P-40 Warhawk outer wing panels were substituted for the P-51 panels.

In mid-1943, the need for long-range escort fighters became more urgent than fast climbing interceptors so a decision was made to order six more XP-75 airplanes modified for the long-range role. At this time, an order for 2,500 production aircraft was also let, but with the stipulation that if the first P-75A was not satisfactory the complete order might be canceled.

At the time, General Motors was busy in several projects towards the war effort, including the mass production of several different aircraft types, among them the Grumman TBF Avenger. Some sources claim that the P-75 was the result of a scheme to get General Motors out of being forced to build Boeing B-29 Superfortresses; the P-75 project being a "high-priority" project to help GM avoid the added strain of Superfortress production. The "Eagle" was given extensive media coverage prior to its first flight, being trumpeted as a "wonder plane".

== Operational history ==
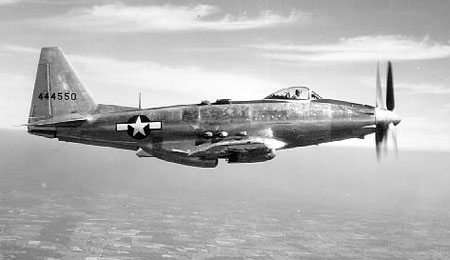
Fisher P-75A in flight

Powered by a V-3420-19 24-cylinder engine rated at 2,600 hp (1,900 kW) driving co-axial contra-rotating propellers, the XP-75 flew for the first time on 17 November 1943. The second XP-75 flew shortly thereafter, with all six long-range XP-75s entering the test program by the spring 1944. The test program brought up numerous teething problems, including miscalculation of the fighter's center of mass, failure of the engine to produce its expected power, inadequate engine cooling, high aileron forces at high speed, and poor spin characteristics. Redesigns were introduced into the long-range XP-75s including a modified tail assembly, new "bubble" canopy, and a V-3420-23 engine that corrected most of the deficiencies by the time the first P-75A Eagles entered flight testing in September 1944.

By this time, the Army Air Forces had decided to limit the number of combat aircraft types in production and not enter into large-scale production of new types that might not be available before the war ended. As the twin-engine Lockheed P-38 Lightning and North American P-51 Mustang demonstrated excellent long-range capabilities, the production run of the P-75A Eagle was subsequently terminated on 6 October 1944. It was decided to use the six completed production aircraft for experimental work and development of the V-3420 engine. As a result of those events, the P-75A did not complete formal performance trials due to termination of the production contract. Ultimately, only eight XP-75s and six P-75As were built.

== Aircraft on display ==
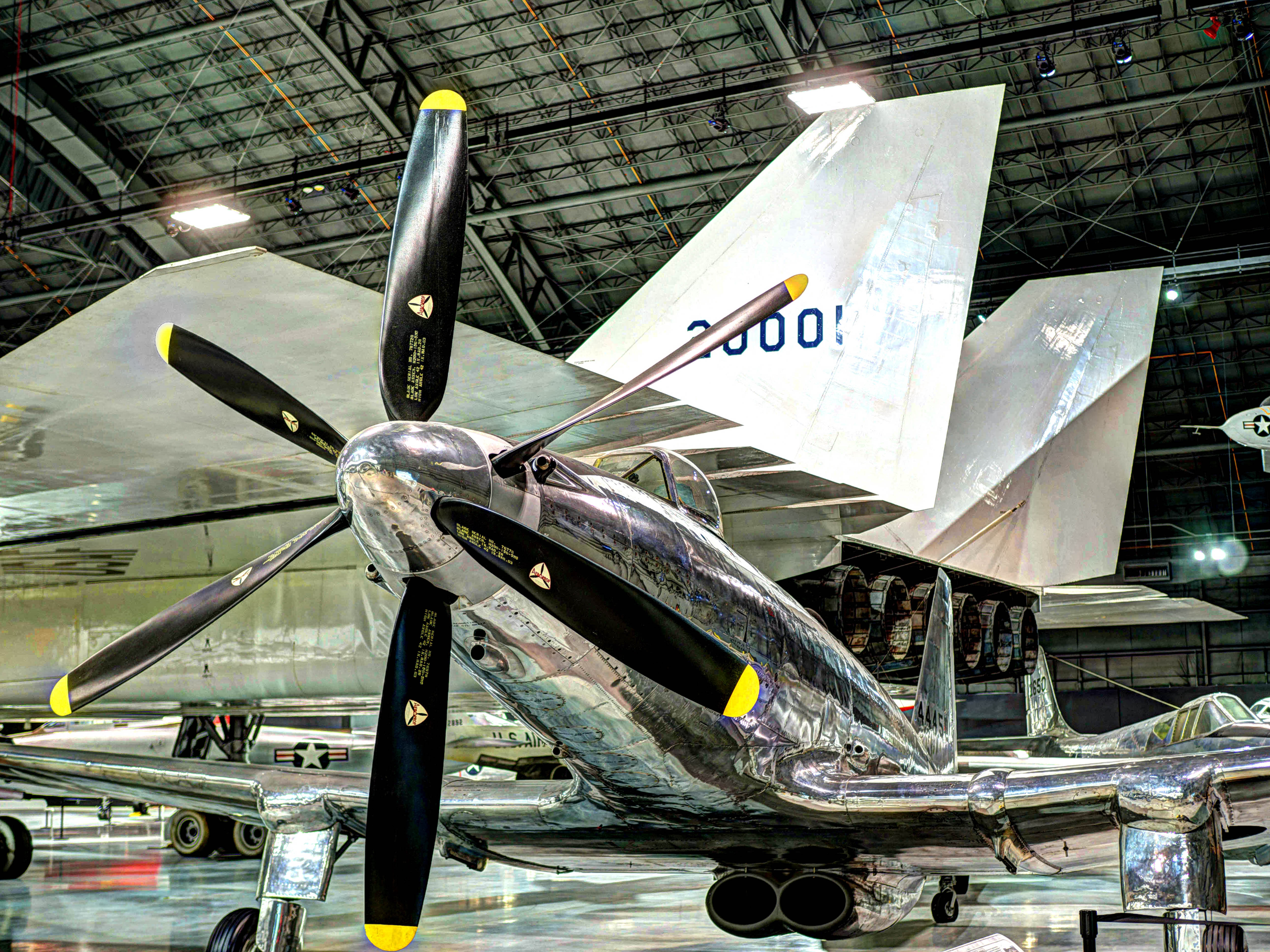
Fisher P-75 Eagle on display at the National Museum of the USAF in the fourth building which opened in 2016

- AAF Ser. No. 44-44553: National Museum of the United States Air Force at Wright-Patterson AFB in Dayton, Ohio. For many years this aircraft was on display in the museum's Experimental Aircraft Gallery. Extensive deterioration of the airframe was discovered by the staff in 1999, which forced the Museum to undertake a full restoration of the aircraft. The work has been completed and the aircraft returned to display in the museum's Experimental Aircraft Gallery.

== Specifications (XP-75) ==
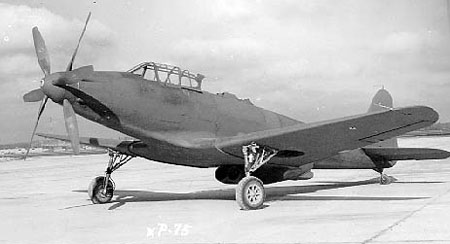
Fisher XP-75 3/4 front view (S/N 43-46950)

Data from War Planes of the Second World War, Volume Four: Fighters and WW2 Aircraft Fact Files: US Army Air Force Fighters, Part 2

General characteristics

- Crew: 1
- Length: 40 ft 5 in (12.32 m)
- Wingspan: 49 ft 4 in (15.04 m)
- Height: 15 ft 6 in (4.72 m)
- Wing area: 347 sq ft (32.2 m^{2})
- Airfoil: root: NACA 2215; tip: NACA 2209
- Empty weight: 11,495 lb (5,214 kg)
- Gross weight: 19,420 lb (8,809 kg)
- Max takeoff weight: 18,210 lb (8,260 kg)
- Powerplant: 1 × Allison V-3420-23 24 cylinder coupled V-12 liquid-cooled piston engine, 2,885 hp (2,151 kW)
- Propellers: 6-bladed contra-rotating propeller

Performance

- Maximum speed: 433 mph (697 km/h, 376 kn) at 20,000 ft (6,096 m)
- Range: 2,050 mi (3,300 km, 1,780 nmi)
- Service ceiling: 36,400 ft (11,100 m)
- Wing loading: 39.8 lb/sq ft (194 kg/m^{2})
- Power/mass: 0.21 hp/lb (0.35 kW/kg)

Armament

- Guns:

- 6× .50 caliber (12.7 mm) wing mounted machine guns
- 4× .50 caliber (12.7 mm) fuselage mounted machine guns

- Bombs:

- 2× 500 lb (227 kg) bombs

== See also ==
Aircraft of comparable role, configuration, and era

- Arsenal VB 10
- Consolidated Vultee XP-81
- Focke-Wulf Ta 152
- Mikoyan-Gurevich I-220
- Republic XP-72

Related lists

- List of aircraft of World War II
- List of military aircraft of the United States

== Bibliography ==
- Buttler, Tony (2024). American Experimental Fighters of WWII: The Pursuit of Excellence. Crécy Publishing. ISBN 978-1-80035-310-7.
- Green, William. War Planes of the Second World War, Volume Four: Fighters. London: Macdonald & Co., 1961. ISBN 0-356-01448-7.
- Green, William and Gordon Swanborough. WW2 Aircraft Fact Files: US Army Air Force Fighters, Part 2. London: Macdonald and Jane's Publishers, 1978. ISBN 0-354-01072-7.
- Norton, Bill. U.S. Experimental & Prototype Aircraft Projects: Fighters 1939–1945. North Branch, Minnesota: Specialty Press, 2008, pp. 128–131. ISBN 978-1-58007-109-3.
- O'Leary, Michael, ed. "XP-75: Spare Parts Fighter." America's Forgotten Wings, Volume 1, 1994.
- Winchester, Jim. The World's Worst Aircraft. London: Amber Books, 2005. ISBN 1-904687-34-2.
