= Lockheed XP-58 Chain Lightning =

1944 fighter aircraft prototype

XP-58 Chain Lightning
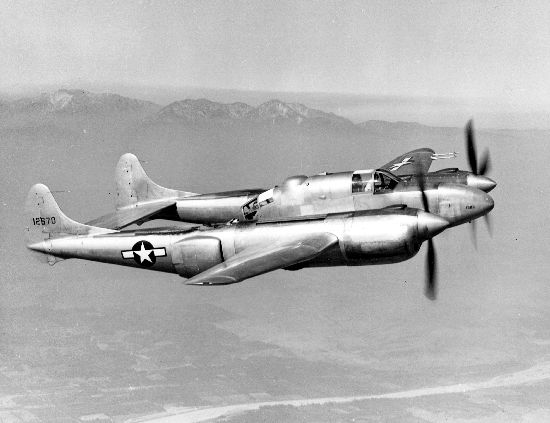
- The sole completed XP-58

General information
- Type: Heavy fighter
- Manufacturer: Lockheed
- Status: Canceled
- Number built: 1

History
- First flight: 6 June 1944
- Developed from: Lockheed P-38 Lightning

The Lockheed XP-58 Chain Lightning was an American long-range fighter developed during World War II. Although derived from the successful P-38 Lightning, the XP-58 was plagued by technical problems with its engines that eventually led to the project's cancellation.

== Design and development ==
The XP-58 was a Lockheed Aircraft Company funded initiative to develop an improved Lightning as a long-range fighter following the release by the U.S. Army Air Corps of the Lightning for sale to Britain on 20 April 1940. Initially, two designs were formulated, both using the Continental IV-1430 engines. One would be a single-seat aircraft with one 20 mm (.79 in) cannon and four .50 caliber (12.7 mm) machine guns. The second would be a two-seat aircraft with the addition of a flexible .50 caliber (12.7 mm) gun at the end of each tail boom.

In July 1940, Lockheed decided to switch to Pratt & Whitney XH-2600 engines as the aircraft would be underpowered with the Continental engines, with the aircraft having two seats and designated "XP-58". However, soon Lockheed was advised the development of the XH-2600 engine was terminated. After consideration of the engine alternatives, the design was changed to use two Wright R-2160 Tornado engines, as well as a change of the rear-facing armament to two turrets, one upper and the other lower on the fuselage, each turret containing two .50 caliber (12.7 mm) machine guns. As support equipment for the two crewmen was added, the estimated weight of the XP-58 grew to 34,232 lb (15,527 kg) by August 1941.

In March 1942, the USAAF placed an order for a second XP-58 that would incorporate increased fuel tanks to obtain a range of 3,000 mi (4,800 km). The Air Force was uncertain about the role and armament of the aircraft, and in September 1942, a decision was made to convert the aircraft for a role as a low-altitude attack aircraft, armed with a 75 mm (2.95 in) M5 autocannon. Adequate aircraft were already available for this mission, with the Douglas A-26 Invader and Beechcraft XA-38 Grizzly under development. As a result, the second XP-58 was canceled and the role of the design reverted to that of a high-altitude fighter, using large-bore cannon firing high-explosive shells to break up bomber formations.

The 37 mm (1.46 in) M4 autocannon was originally selected for a quadruple mount in the nose, but the trajectory of the 37mm shells dropped lower than other weaponry, limiting its effective range. A hydraulically articulated nose that could be bent up to correct this problem was tried, but was dismissed as too complex. Then, a 75 mm (2.95 in) M5 autocannon paired with twin .50 caliber (12.7 mm) machine guns was tried and proved much more successful.

In January 1943, the USAAF initiated a separate program to build a dedicated photographic reconnaissance aircraft with superior range, altitude and speed characteristics, as the loss of air bases in China had placed strategic targets in Japan beyond the range of almost all existing Allied aircraft, and some USAAF leaders objected to diverting bombers such as the B-29 to serve in a pure reconnaissance role. Lockheed proposed a modified version of the XP-58. However, in August 1943, General Henry H. Arnold chose the Hughes XF-11 over the Lockheed against the recommendations of Air Materiel Command, which said that Hughes Aircraft lacked the expertise and industrial capacity for mass production. The XF-11 would be plagued by technical and managerial delays and never entered service; Arnold later publicly expressed regret for his decision. The Northrop F-15 Reporter, a development of the P-61 Black Widow, would enter service in this role.

== Testing ==
In February 1943, use of another engine, the Allison V-3420, was necessary due to poor progress with the Tornado engine development. With this change, the second XP-58 was resurrected. The XP-58 had its first flight on 6 June 1944, but flight test work on the XP-58 took second place to other higher priority developments. Eventually, 25 test flights were completed. The XP-58 was then flown to Wright Field for USAAF acceptance tests, even though the turbo-superchargers were experiencing torching and a number of systems were not installed including provision for cockpit pressurization and armament with its fire-control equipment. Although the prototype arrived at Wright Field on 22 October 1944, the aircraft was a maintenance headache and no further trials were conducted. The construction of the second prototype was abandoned.

== Specifications (XP-58) ==
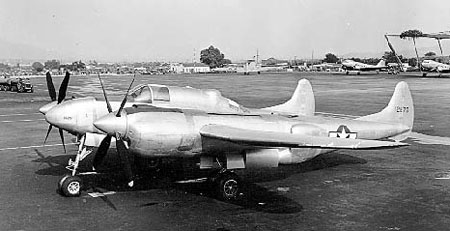
Lockheed XP-58 Chain Lightning side view.

Data from Lockheed Aircraft since 1913

General characteristics

- Crew: two, pilot and gunner
- Length: 49 ft 5.5 in (15.07 m)
- Wingspan: 70 ft 0 in (21.34 m)
- Height: 16 ft 0 in (4.88 m)
- Wing area: 600 sq ft (55.7 m^{2})
- Empty weight: 31,624 lb (14,344 kg)
- Max takeoff weight: 39,192 lb (17,777 kg)
- Powerplant: 2 × Allison V-3420 24 cylinder liquid-cooled engine, 3,000 hp (2,238 kW) each

Performance

- Maximum speed: 436 mph (702 km/h, 379 kn) at 25,000 ft (7,620 m)
- Cruise speed: 283 mph (455 km/h, 246 kn)
- Range: 2,650 mi (4,265 km, 2,304 nmi)
- Service ceiling: 38,200 ft (11,645 m)
- Rate of climb: 2,582 ft/min (13.1 m/s)

Armament

- Guns:
  - (proposed) 4 × 37 mm (1.5 in) M4 cannons or 1 × 75 mm (2.95 in) M5 cannon and 2 × .50 in (12.7 mm) Browning heavy machine guns in interchangeable nose
  - (proposed) 4 × .50 in (12.7 mm) Browning heavy machine guns in two remotely controlled flexible turrets in the rear.

== See also ==
Aircraft of comparable role, configuration, and era

- Bristol Beaufighter
- Northrop P-61 Black Widow
- North American F-82 Twin Mustang

Related lists

- List of aircraft of World War II
