= List of aircraft (E) =

This is a list of aircraft in alphabetical order beginning with 'E'.

== E ==
=== E & P ===
(Elson & Pruitt, Flint, MI)

- E & P Special
- E-C-13 1916 Triplane Tractor

=== e-Go ===
{e-Go Aeroplanes Limited, United Kingdom}

- e-Go

=== E-volo ===
- E-volo VC1
- E-volo VC2
- E-volo VC007
- E-volo VC200
- E-Volo VC Evolution 1P
- E-volo VC Evolution 2P

=== EAA ===
(Eagle Aircraft Pty Ltd) see: Eagle

=== EAA ===
(Experimental Aircraft Assn, Hales Corners, WI)

- EAA Baby Ace C
- EAA Acro Sport
- EAA Biplane
- EAA Nesmith Cougar
- EAA Pober Pixie

=== EAC ===
(Engineers Aircraft Corp, Stamford, CT)

- Engineers Aircraft Corporation EAC-1

=== EAC ===
(Société d'Etudes Aéronautiques et Commerciales - EAC)

- EAC D.127
- EAC D.128

=== EADS ===
- EADS Mako/High Energy Advanced Trainer
- EADS Phoenix
- EADS KC-45

==== EADS CASA ====
- EADS CASA HC-144 Ocean Sentry

==== EADS PZL ====
- EADS PZL Warszawa-Okecie PZL-112 Junior

=== EADS 3 Sigma ===
- 3 Sigma Nearchos

=== EAF ===
( EAF (Greek:Εργοστάσιο Αεροπλάνων Φαλήρου - Phaliron Aircraft Factory))

see KEA

=== Eagle ===
(Eagle Aircraft Company, Boise, ID)

- Eagle DW.1
- Eagle 220
- Eagle 300

=== Eagle ===
(Eagle Aircraft Pty Ltd / EAA - Eagle Aircraft Australia)

- Eagle X-TS
- Eagle 150A
- Eagle 150B
- Eagle ARV System

=== Eagle Aviation LLC ===
(Eagle Aviation LLC, Oshkosh, WI)

- Eagle EA-100

=== Eagle Helicopter ===
- Eagle Helicopter Eagle II
- Eagle Helicopter Eagle III

=== Eagle R&D ===
(Designer:B.J. Schramm)

- Eagle Helicycle

=== Eagle's Perch Inc ===
(Eagle's Perch Inc, Carrollton, VA)

- Eagle's Perch
- Nolan 51-HJ

=== Eagles Wing Corporation ===
(Normandy, TN)

- Eagles Wing Scout

=== Earl ===
((Harry W) Earl Aviation Corp, Portland, OR)

- Earl Populaire

=== Early Bird Aircraft Company ===
(Erie, CO)

- Early Bird Spad 13
- Early Bird Jenny

=== Earthstar ===
- Earthstar Gull 2000
- Earthstar Laughing Gull
- Earthstar Odyssey
- Earthstar Soaring Gull
- Earthstar Thunder Gull
- Earthstar Thunder Gull J
- Earthstar Thunder Gull JT2
- Earthstar Thunder Gull Odyssey

=== East-Olsen ===
(Clifford East & William Olsen, Muni Airport, Denver, CO)

- East-Olsen 1933 Monoplane

=== Eastern ===
(United Eastern Aeroplane Corp, Hempstead, NY)

- Eastern Tractor Biplane
- Eastern Sportplane

=== Eastern Ultralights ===
- Eastern Ultralights Snoop I
- Eastern Ultralights Snoop +
- Eastern Ultralights Snoop II

=== Eastman ===
(Eastman Aircraft Corp (Beasley, Eastman, Edward S Evans, Carl B Squier), Detroit, MI)

- Eastman E-2 Sea Rover
- Eastman E-2A Sea Pirate
- Eastman E-2D Sea Pirate

=== Eastwood ===
- Eastwood Tyro
- Eastwood Tyro Mk.II

=== EasyUp ===
(Medford, OR)

- EasyUp Parapropter

=== Eaves ===
(Leonard Eaves, Leroy Huff, Lloyd Pearson, Oklahoma City, OK)

- Eaves Cougar 1
- Eaves Skeeter (N1111V)
- Huff Huffaire (N1111W)
- Pearson Sugar Babe (N1111J)
- Eaves Catfish
- Eaves Sting Ray

=== EAY ===
(Empresa Aeronáutica Ypiranga)

- EAY-101
- EAY-201 Ypiranga

=== Eberhardt ===
(Eberhart Aeroplane & Motor Co.)

- Eberhardt SE.5E
- Eberhardt FG
- Eberhardt F2G Commanche
- Eberhardt Iroquois

=== Eberman ===
(Gus Eberman, Geneva, IL)

- Eberman 1930 Monoplane

=== ECA-Fernas ===
( Entreprise de construction aéronautique)

- ECA-Fernas 142

=== Eck ===
(Ing. Robert Eck)

- Eck E.120 Dolomitenvogel
- Eck E.140 Dolomitenvogel

=== Ecker ===
(Herman A Ecker, Syracuse, NY)

- Ecker 1911 Biplane
- Ecker 1912 Biplane
- Ecker 1914 Biplane
- Ecker Flying Boat

=== Eckley ===
(William R Eckley, Mabel, MI)

- Eckley WJ-3

=== Eclipse ===
(Eclipse Aviation and Eclipse Aerospace (Fdr: Vern Raburn), Albuquerque, NM)

- Eclipse ECJ
- Eclipse 400
- Eclipse 500
- Eclipse 550

=== Ector ===
(Ector Aircraft Co, Odessa, TX)

- Ector Mountaineer (Cessna L-19 conv.)
- Ector Super Mountaineer (Cessna L-19 conv.)

=== Eddy ===
(Paul Eddy, Findlay, OH)

- Eddy 1950 Biplane (Ryan PT-22 biplane conv.)

=== Eddyo ===
(Ed Young, Erie, CO)

- Eddyo F-2

=== Edel Paragliders ===
(Gwangju, South Korea)

- Edel Ace
- Edel Be All
- Edel Excel
- Edel Live
- Edel Millennium
- Edel Mountain
- Edel New
- Edel Prime Bi
- Edel Quantum

=== Edison ===
(Thomas Alva Edison, Menlo Park, NJ)

- Edison 1910 Helicopter

=== Edgar Percival Aircraft ===
- Edgar Percival E.P.9

=== Edley ===
(John G Edley, Miami, FL)

- Edley C-90

=== Edgley ===
(Edgley Aircraft Ltd.)

- Edgley EA7 Optica

=== Edmunds ===
(Phil Edmunds, Troy, OH)

- Edmunds AOK
- Edmunds G-1 Flying Scooter

=== Edo ===
(EDO Aircraft Corp (Fdr: Earl D Osborne), College Point, NY)

- Edo B (a.k.a. Aeromarine EO)
- Edo 1925 Monoplane (a.k.a. Aeromarine EO)
- Edo Malolo 1
- Edo Malolo 2
- Edo Malolo 3
- Edo OSE
- Edo S2E
- Edo TE
- Edo Model 142

=== EDRA ===
(EDRA Pecas e Manutencao Ltda / EDRA Aeronautica)

- EDRA Aeronautica Paturi
- EDRA Aeronautica Super Pétrel
- EDRA Aeronautica Super Pétrel LS

=== Edwards ===
(Edwards Common Sense Aeroplane Co, Tell City, IN)

- Edwards 1909 Aeroplane
- Edwards 1914 Hydroaeroplane

=== Edwards ===
(James Edwards, Los Angeles, CA)

- Edwards Scout

=== Edwards ===
((George) Sterling Edwards Aircraft Co, 1055 California St, S San Francisco, CA)

- Edwards XMBM-1

=== EEL ===
(Entwicklung und Erprobung von Leichtflugzeugen, Putzbrunn, Germany)

- EEL ULF 1 – glider designed by Dieter Reich
- EEL ULF 2 – motor glider designed by Dieter Reich

=== EFF ===
(Entwicklungsgemeinschaft für Flugzeugbau)

- EFF Prometheus 1
- EFF Prometheus 19
- EFF Prometheus 12
- EFF Prometheus PV

=== Effenheim ===
(Edward & Ray Effenheim, Milwaukee, WI)

- Effenheim E-1 Special a.k.a. Hawk
- Effenheim E-2

=== Efremov ===
(N. Efremov)

- Efremov C-1

=== EFW ===
(Eigenössische Flugzeug Werke) see:EKW

=== Egge ===
(Norman C Egge, Boston, MA)

- Egge Hornet

=== EGHS ===
(Eau Gallie High School, FL)

- EGHS Gull

=== Eglin ===
(R T Eglin and Roy Moss, Los Angeles, CA)

- Eglin E-1

=== Egvoyager ===
(Egvoyager srl, Martellago, Italy)

- Egvoyager Voyager 203

=== Egyptian General Aero Organisation (EGAO) ===
- Helwan HA-300

=== EH Industries ===
(Joint venture company formed by Agusta and Westland to manage and market EH-101)

- EH Industries EH 101
- EHI CH-148 Petrel
- EHI CH-149 Chimo

=== Ehmann ===
(Rolf Ehmann)

- Ehmann RE 2 Doppelraab

=== Ehroflug ===
(Ehroflug GmbH, Altneu, Switzerland)

- Ehroflug Coach II S

=== Eich ===
(James P Eich, Alhambra, CA)

- Eich JE-2 Gyroplane

=== Eichenfeldt ===
(E I Eichenfeldt, Minneapolis, MN)

- Eichenfeldt 1909 Biplane

=== Eichmann ===
(Ellis Eichmann, Brownsville, TX)

- Eichmann A
- Eichmann B
- Eichmann Aerobat I
- Eichmann Aerobat II
- Eichmann Aerobat III

=== Ekin ===
( W. H. Ekin (Engineering) Company)

- Ekin Airbuggy

=== Eklund ===
(Torolf Eklund)

- Eklund TE-1

=== Ekolot ===
(PPHU Ekolot, Krosno, Poland)

- Ekolot JK 01A Elf
- Ekolot JK-05L Junior
- Ekolot KR-030 Topaz

=== Ekonomov ===
- Zhiroplan

=== Ekström ===
(Staffan W. Ekström)

- Ekström Humlan 2

=== EKW ===
(Eidgenoessische Konstruktionswerkstaette English: "Swiss Federal Constructions Works",
also known as Eigenössische Flugzeug Werke - EFW, or as Flug + Werk)

- EKW MA-7 (Militär-Apparat - MA-7)
- EKW C-35 two-seat reconnaissance biplane
- EKW C-3600
- EKW C-3602 - two prototypes
- EKW C-3603 - pre-production series (10 built)
  - C-3603-1 - main production version (148 built, at least 60 later converted to target tugs)
    - C-3603-1 TR - trainer version (2 built)
- EKW C-3604 - Post-war development using Saurer YS-2 engine (13 built)
- F+W C-3605 - Turboprop version with Lycoming T53 engine (24 converted from C-3603-1)
- EKW D-3800 - licence built M.S.406H fighter
- EKW D-3801 - development of D-3800
- EKW D-3802 - licence built M.S.450/540 fighter
- EKW D-3803 - development of D-3800 with bubble canopy

=== El Gavilán ===
(see List of aircraft (G)#Gavilán)

=== El-Jo ===
(Donald & Galen Elser-Carlyle Jobes, Lima, OH)

- El-Jo Sportplane A-2

=== ELA ===
(ELA Aviacion S.L., Cordoba, Spain)

- ELA 07 Cougar
- ELA 07 Agro
- ELA 07S
- ELA 08
- ELA 09 Junior
- ELA 10 Eclipse

=== Elbit ===
(Elbit Systems, Israel)

- Elbit Hermes 90
- Elbit Hermes 450
- Elbit Hermes 900
- Elbit Skylark
- Silver Arrow Micro-V
- Silver Arrow Sniper

=== Eldred ===
(Dewey Eldred, Willoughby, OH)

- Eldred ED-2 Flyer's Dream

=== Eleaume ===
(René Eleaume)

- Eleaume RE.1

=== Electravia ===
(Electravia Hélices E-Props, France)

- Electravia BL1E Electra
- Electravia MC15E Cri-Cri
- Electravia Electro Trike
- Electravia Monotrace-E

=== Electric Aircraft Corporation ===
(Cliffside Park, NJ)

- Electric Aircraft Corporation ElectraFlyer Trike
- Electric Aircraft Corporation ElectraFlyer-C
- Electric Aircraft Corporation ElectraFlyer-X
- Electric Aircraft Corporation ElectraFlyer-ULS

=== Electric Ride ===
(Baierbrunn, Germany)

- Electric Ride E-Bird

=== Electricsports ===
(Electricsports GmbH, Ostrach, Germany)

- Electricsports ES-Trike
- Electricsports GS-Trike
- Electricsports Scott-e

=== Electroflight ===
- Electroflight P1e
- Electroflight/Rolls-Royce ACCEL NXT

=== Elektro Mechanische Werke ===
(Elektromechanische Werke GmbH. Zwischenzeugnis, Karlshagen/Peenemünde)

- EMW A4b
- EMW A6
- EMW A9/6P Kolkrabe
- EMW A10
- EMW C2 Wasserfall

=== Elias ===
(G Elias & Brother, Buffalo, NY)

- Elias AJE Air Express
- Elias Airmobile
- Elias AJE
- Elias EC-1 Aircoupe
- Elias Airsport
- Elias EC-3 Airmobile
- Elias EM-1
- Elias EM-2
- Elias ES-1 (a.k.a. Elias-Stupar Twin)
- Elias EO
- Elias M-1 Mailplane
- Elias NBS-3
- Elias Sport#1
- Elias Sport#2
- Elias Sport#3
- Elias TA-1

=== Elitar ===
(Elitar (Samara VVV-Avia))

- Elitar Sigma
- Elitar IE-101 Elitar
- Elitar IE-201 Senator
- Elitar IE-202
- Elitar IE-203
- Elitar-202
- Elitar-401

=== Elixir Aircraft ===
(Elixir Aircraft, France)

- Elixir Aircraft Elixir

=== Ellehammer ===
- Ellehammer monoplane
- Ellehammer semi-biplane
- Ellehammer triplane
- Ellehammer helicopter
- Ellehammer No1
- Ellehammer No3
- Ellehammer IV 1908

=== Elliot ===
(H E Elliot, Los Angeles, CA)

- Elliot Sport

=== Elliotts of Newbury ===
- Elliotts Newbury Eon
- Elliotts Baby Eon
- Elliotts Olympia Eon
- Elliotts Primary Eon

=== Ellipse ===
(La société Ellipse, Etuz-Marnay, France)

- Ellipse Alizé
- Ellipse Fuji 16 Alizé
- Ellipse Titan CX Alizé
- Ellipse DTA
- Ellipse Fuji
- Ellipse Sol'R
- Ellipse Titan
- Ellipse Twist
- Ellipse Windee
- Ellipse Zenith

=== Ellison-Mahon ===
- Ellison-Mahon Gweduck

=== Elmendorf ===
(Leonard C Elmendorf, Garden City, MI)

- Elmendorf Special

=== Elmwood Aviation ===
- Elmwood CA-05 Christavia Mk.I
- Elmwood Christavia Mk.II
- Elmwood CH-8 Christavia Mk.IV

=== Elroy Air ===
- Elroy Air Cargo

=== Ely ===
(David Ely)

- Ely Twin

=== Elytroplan ===
See:de Rouge

=== Emair ===
(Emair, div of Murrayair Ltd, Harlingen, TX) (a.k.a. Agronemair)

- Emair MA-1 Paymaster
- Emair MA-1B Diablo 1200
- Emair MA-2 Paymaster

=== Emblem ===
(Arizona Airmobile Co, Phoenix, AZ)

- Emblem Biplane 1911

=== Embraer ===
(Empresa Brasileira de Aeronáutica S. A. English: Brazilian Aeronautics Company, Inc.)

- Embraer E-99
- Embraer E-190
- Embraer EMB 110 Bandeirante
- Embraer EMB 111
- Embraer EMB 120 Brasilia
- Embraer EMB 121 Xingu
- Embraer EMB 123 Tapajós
- Embraer EMB 145 Erieye
- Embraer EMB 200 Ipanema
- Embraer EMB 201 Ipanema
- Embraer EMB 202 Ipanema
- Embraer EMB 326 Xavante
- Embraer EMB 312 Tucano
- Embraer EMB 314 Super Tucano
- Embraer EMB 710 Carioca (PA-28-235)
- Embraer EMB 711 Corisco (PA-28-200R)
- Embraer EMB 712 Tupi
- Embraer EMB 720 Minuano (PA-32-300)
- Embraer EMB 721 Sertanejo
- Embraer EMB 810 Sêneca (PA-34-200T)
- Embraer EMB 820 Navajo (PA-31-350)
- Embraer EMB 821 Carajá
- Embraer/FMA CBA 123 Vector
- Embraer Lineage 1000
- Embraer Legacy 450
- Embraer Legacy 500
- Embraer Legacy 600
- Embraer Legacy 700
- Embraer Phenom 100
- Embraer Phenom 300
- Embraer Praetor 500
- Embraer Praetor 600
- Embraer E-Jet family
- Embraer E-Jet E2 family
- Embraer ERJ 135
- Embraer ERJ 140
- Embraer ERJ 145
- Embraer ERJ family
- Embraer R-99
- Embraer R-99A
- Embraer 170
- Embraer 175
- Embraer 190
- Embraer 195
- Embraer C-390
- Embraer MFT-LF

=== Emerald Coast Aircraft ===
(Panama City, FL)

- Emerald Coast XL2 Sport

=== Emigh ===
((Harold) Emigh Aircraft Co, Denver, CO)

- Emigh Airsport
- Emigh Commuter Jr.
- Emigh Rocket
- Emigh A-2 Trojan

=== Emmert ===
(Don Pittman, Sapulpa, OK)

- Emmert Special

=== Empire State ===
(Empire State Aircraft Corp, Hempstead Plains, NY)

- Empire State 1916 Military Tractor Biplane

=== Emsco ===
((E M Smith & Associates) EMSCO Aircraft Corp, Long Beach, CA)

- Emsco B-2 Challenger
- Emsco B-3
- Emsco B-3A
- Emsco B-4
- Emsco B-5
- Emsco B-7 Sport
- Emsco B-8 Flying Wing
- Emsco B-10
- Emsco Arctic Tern

=== ENAER ===
(Empresa Nacional de Aeronáutica de Chile English:National Aeronautic Enterprise of Chile).

- ENAER Pantera
- ENAER T-35 Pillán
- ENAER T-35T Aucán
- ENAER A-36 Halcón
- ENAER T-36 Halcón
- ENAER ECH-02 Ñamcú - original design
- ENAER Eaglet - as modified for production
- ENAER E.26 Tamiz
- ENAER Avion Livano

=== Endicott ===
(J L Endicott Airplane Co, Medford, NY)

- Endicott 1910 Biplane

=== Engels ===
(Yevgenii Robertovich Engels)

- Engels 1915 monoplane
- Engels MI (Morskoi Istrebitel - marine fighter)
- Engels I
- Engels II
- Engels III

=== Enghusen-Anderson ===
(Victor Enghusen & Morris Anderson, Frontenac, MN)

- Enghusen-Anderson 1931 Monoplane

=== Engineering Division ===
(Engr Division, McCook Field, Dayton, OH; Hampton Roads, VA)

- Engineering Division XB-1A
- Engineering Division-Pomilio BVL-12
- Engineering Division XCO-5
- Engineering Division XCO-6
- Engineering Division DH-4
- Engineering Division-Pomilio FVL-8
- Engineering Division GAX
- Engineering Division GA-1
- Engineering Division H-1
- Engineering Division M-1
- Engineering Division NBL-1
- Engineering Division TP-1
- Engineering Division TW-1
- Engineering Division USAC-1
- Engineering Division USB
- Engineering Division USD-9A
- Engineering Division VCP
- Engineering Division P-28 (McCook Field)
- Engineering Division P-68 (McCook Field)
- Engineering Division P-69 (McCook Field)
- Engineering Division P-176 (McCook Field)
- Engineering Division P-200 (McCook Field)
- Engineering Division P-263 (McCook Field)
- Engineering Division P-303 (McCook Field)
- Verville-Packard R-1

=== Engle ===
((Richard B "Dick") Engle Aircraft Corp (a.k.a. Palmer Inventions Inc, Engel Air Products Inc, Palmer Cam Engine Mfg Co), Framingham, Natick, Boston, and Cambridge, Massachusetts)

- Engle 10 (a.k.a. Engel 1-C)
- Engle T-1 little Chief

=== Engle-Myers ===
(Bruce Engle and Garland Myers, Burlington, IA)

- Engle-Myers Red Wing

=== English ===
(Peter & W P English, Oakland and San Francisco, CA)

- English 1908 Helicopter

=== English Electric ===
- English Electric Ayr
- English Electric Canberra
- English Electric Kingston
- English Electric P.1B Lightning
- English Electric P.1
- English Electric P.10
- English Electric P.42
- English Electric Wren

=== Engstrom ===
(Erik Engstrom)

- Engstrom EES-1 Sky Swallow V1

=== Ensley ===
(A Y Ensley, Livingston, CA)

- Ensley A-1

=== Enstrom ===
- Enstrom F-28
- Enstrom T-28
- Enstrom TH-28
- Enstrom TH180
- Enstrom 280
- Enstrom 480

=== Entecho ===
- Entecho Demipod
- Entecho Mupod

=== Entler ===
(Victor Entler / Entler-Werke, Wilhelmshaven)

- Entler E.II

=== Entwicklungsring-Nord ===
(Joint Venture between Weserflug, Focke-Wulf, and Hamburger Flugzeugbau; Weserflug and Focke-Wulf were later absorbed into VFW)

- Erno-61-4

=== Entwicklungsring-Süd ===
(see #EWR)

=== Epic ===
(Epic Air LLC / Epic Aviation )

- Epic Dynasty
- Epic LT
- Epic Elite
- Epic Escape
- Epic Victory
- Epic E1000

=== Epps ===
(Ben T Epps, Athens, GA)

- Epps 1907 Monoplane
- Epps 1909 Monoplane
- Epps 1910 Monoplane
- Epps 1911 Monoplane
- Epps 1912 Monoplane
- Epps 1916 Biplane
- Epps 1924 Monoplane
- Epps 1930 Biplane
- Epps M-1

=== Equator ===
(Equator Aircraft Gesellschaft fur Flugzeugbau mbH Ulm)

- Equator P-300 Equator
- Equator P-350 Equator
- Equator P-400 Equator
- Equator P-420 Turbo Equator
- Equator P-420 Twin Equator
- Equator P-450 Equator
- Equator P-550 Turbo Equator
- Equator P2 Excursion

=== Erasmus ===
- Erasmus SA 40

=== Erasmus ===
(C.J. Erasmus, Chicago, IL)

- Erasmus Super Parasol

=== ERCO ===
(Engineering and Research Corporation (Pres: Henry A Berliner), Washington, DC and Riverdale, MD)

- ERCO 191-A
- ERCO 310
- Ercoupe
- Ercoupe XPQ-13
- Ercoupe O-55
- Twin Ercoupe

=== Erickson (aircraft constructor) ===
(Erickson, Springfield, MA)

- Erickson Taft-Kingsbury

=== Erickson ===
(T E Erickson, Minneapolis, MN)

- Erickson 1938 Monoplane

=== Erickson Air Crane ===
(Erickson Air-Crane Inc, Central Point, Orlando, FL)

- Erickson Air Crane

=== Erika ===
(Louis Erickson, Springfield, MA)

- Erika 1910 Biplane

=== Erla ===
(Erla Maschinenwerk, designer Franz Xaver Mehr)

- Erla 3
- Erla Me 4 (glider)
- Erla Me 5
- Erla Me 6

=== Ernoul ===
(France)

- Ernoul-Dewoitine F.A.T.M.A.2 Commercial Monoplane

=== Ernst ===
(Ernst Flying Machine Co, no location.)

- Ernst 1907 Aeroplane

=== ERPALS ===
(Études et Réalisations de Protottypes pour l'Aviation Légère et Sportiv)

- ERPALS JH.03 le Courlis

=== ESA ===
- ESA Spacelab

=== Escapade ===
(Escapade Aircraft Limited, United Kingdom)

- Escapade Kid

=== Esch ===
(Joseph W Esch, Akron, OH)

- Esch Special

=== Eshelman ===
(Cheston L Eshelman Corp, Dundalk, MD)

- Eshelman EF-100 Winglet
- Eshelman Flying Flounder
- Eshelman FW-5

=== Eskildsen ===
(Kenneth Eskildsen, Lexington, NE)

- Eskildsen Indian Chief

=== Esnault-Pelterie ===
- Esnault-Pelterie REP.1
- Esnault-Pelterie REP.2
- Esnault-Pelterie REP.A
- Esnault-Pelterie REP.B
- Esnault-Pelterie REP.C
- Esnault-Pelterie REP.D
- Esnault-Pelterie REP.K

=== Espenlaub ===
(Gottlob Espenlaub / Espenlaub Flugzeugbau)

- Espenlaub E-01
- Espenlaub E-02 – designer:Alexander Lippisch
- Espenlaub E-03
- Espenlaub E-04
- Espenlaub E-05
- Espenlaub E-09
- Espenlaub E-11a
- Espenlaub E-12
- Espenlaub E-14
- Espenlaub E-15
- Espenlaub E-15 Rak
- Espenlaub E-32
- Espenlaub E-33
- Espenlaub Motorsegler
- Espenlaub Rakete
- Espenlaub S
- Espenlaub Schleppflugzeug
- Espenlaub Schulflugzeug

=== Essig ===
(Essig Aero Advertising Service, Los Angeles, CA)

- Essig Ace

=== ESTA ===
(Ecole Spéciale des Travaux Aéronautiques / Antoine Odier & Gustave Bessière)

- ESTA Clinogyro

=== Estivals & Domecq ===
(René Estivals & Jean Domecq)

- Estivals & Domecq ED.3

=== Etheredge ===
(W C Etheredge, Spartanburg, SC)

- Etheredge Trainer

=== Ethiopian Airlines ===
(Addis Ababa, Ethiopia)

- Ethiopian Airlines Eshet

=== Etrich ===
(Igo Etrich / Etrich FlugzeugWerke (EFW), Austria)

- Etrich-Wels 1904 kite/glider
- Etrich-Wels 1906 Glider – Etrich's Leaf, 1906
- Etrich No1 1908
- Etrich Taube
- EFW Etrich Taube:Produced by the inventor Igo Etrich and EFW Etrich Flugzeugwerke.
- EFW Etrich II Taube 2-seater tractor monoplane
- EFW Etrich II modified Taube tractor monoplane
- EFW Etrich III Möve (Seagull) tractor monoplane
- EFW Etrich IV Manövertaube Type B military 2-seater monoplane
- EFW Etrich IV Taube tractor monoplane
- EFW Etrich V Taube tractor monoplane
- EFW Etrich VI Taube tractor monoplane
- EFW Etrich VII Renntaube 3-seater racing monoplane (1911)
- EFW Etrich VIII Luft-Limousine 4-seater high-wing monoplane (1911–12)
- EFW Etrich IX Schwalbe monoplane
- EFW Etrich XII Rennapparat 2-seater bomber monoplane
- EFW Etrich Taube Type 1913 2-seater bomber monoplane
- EFW Etrich Manövertaube Type F 2-seater military monoplane
- EFW Etrich Etrichapparat monoplane
  - Etrich-Rumpler Taube:Initial name of the
  - Rumpler Taube
    - Rumpler Delfin-Taube (Rumpler Kabinentaube Delfin) Version with a closed cabin
  - Gotha Taube:Produced by the Gothaer Waggonfabrik (Land Eindecker - "Land Monoplane") and designated Gotha A.I by the Idflieg
    - Gotha LE.1
    - Gotha LE.2
    - Gotha LE.3
  - Harlan Pfeil Taube
  - Halberstadt Taube III:Produced by the Halberstadt.
  - Jeannin Stahltaube:Version with a steel tubing fuselage structure.
  - Kondor Taube:Produced by the Kondor.
  - RFG Taube:Produced by the Reise- und Industrieflug GmbH (RFG).
  - Roland Taube
  - Albatros Taube:Produced by the Albatros Flugzeugwerke
    - Albatros Doppeltaube:Biplane version produced by the Albatros Flugzeugwerke.
  - Aviatik Taube:Produced by the Automobil und Aviatik AG firm.
  - DFW Stahltaube:Version with a steel frame
- Etrich A.I
- Etrich A.II
- Etrich Luft-Limousine (1912–13)
- Etrich Sport-Taube (1929)

=== Etudes Andre Morin ===
(Colombes, France)

- Etudes Andre Morin M 85

=== Euler ===
(Euler-Werke / Euler Flugmaschinen-Werke)

- Euler Hydro-triplane
- Euler B.I
- Euler B.II
- Euler B.III
- Euler C
- Euler D.I
- Euler D.II
- Euler Doppeldecker 1
- Euler Doppeldecker 2
- Euler Dreidecker 1
- Euler Dreidecker 2
- Euler Dreidecker 3
- Euler Dreidecker 4
- Euler Dreidecker 5
- Euler Pusher Einsitzer (Gelber Hund - yellow hound)
- Euler Vierdecker
- Euler Military triplane
- Euler 1911 eindecker (not a Taube)
- Euler 1912 eindecker (not a Taube)

=== Euro-ALA ===
(Euro-ALA, Italy)

- Euro-ALA Jet Fox

=== Eurocopter ===
- Eurocopter AS 332 Super Puma
- Eurocopter AS 365 Dauphin
- Eurocopter AS 532 Cougar
- Eurocopter AS 550/555 Fennec
- Eurocopter AS 565 Panther
- Eurocopter BO 105
- Eurocopter EC 120 Colibri
- Eurocopter EC 130
- Eurocopter EC 135
- Eurocopter EC 145
- Eurocopter EC 155
- Eurocopter EC 175
- Eurocopter EC 225 Super Puma Mk.III
- Eurocopter EC 635
- Eurocopter EC 665 Tiger
- Eurocopter EC 725 Caracel
- Eurocopter MH-65 Dolphin
- Eurocopter/Kawasaki BK 117

=== Eurodisplay ===
(Kozomín, Czech Republic)

- Eurodisplay SR-01 Magic

=== EuroFAR ===
(European Future Advanced Rotorcraft)

- EuroFAR

=== Eurofighter ===
- Eurofighter Typhoon

=== EuroFLAG ===
(European Future Large Aircraft Group) See: Airbus A400M Atlas

=== Eurofly ===
(Eurofly srl, Galliera Veneta, Italy)

- Eurofly FB5 Star Light
- Eurofly Flash Light
- Eurofly Viper
- Eurofly Fire Cat
- Eurofly Fox
- Eurofly Basic Fox
- Eurofly Fire Fox
- Eurofly Fire Fox 2000

=== Europa ===
- Europa Classic
- Europa XS
- Europa Motorglider
- Europa LSA
- Europa Elite

=== Europe Sails ===
(Neukirchen, Austria)

- Europe Sails Excel
- Europe Sails Hyper
- Europe Sails Independent
- Europe Sails Special Dimensione

=== EuroSport ===
(EuroSport Aircraft Lda)

- EuroSport Crossover

=== Evangel ===
- Evangel 4500

=== Evans ===
((W Samuel) Evans Aircraft, La Jolla, CA)

- Evans VP-1 Volksplane
- Evans VP-2

=== Evektor ===
- Evektor EPOS
- Evektor EV-55 Outback
- Evektor EV-97
- Evektor SportStar
- Evektor SportStar SL
- Evektor EuroStar
- Evektor VUT100 Cobra
- Evektor Harmony LSA

=== Everage ===
(Ira Everage, Houston TX.)

- Everage Texas Turbo

=== Everett ===
(Marvin Everett Sr, Somerville, NJ)

- Everett Sportsman

=== Evers ===
(W. Heinrich Evers of Lamstedt)

- Evers E.1
- Evers E.2
- NFW E.5

=== Everson ===
(Arthur and Ernest Everson)

- Everson Evo I
- Everson Evo II
- Everson Evo III

=== Eviation ===
(Eviation Aircraft)

- Eviation Alice

=== Evolution Aircraft ===
(Redmond, OR)

- Lancair Evolution

=== Evolution Trikes ===
(Zephyrhills, FL)

- Evolution Revo

=== EWR ===
- EWR VJ 101

=== Excalibur ===
(Excalibur Aircraft)

- Excalibur Aircraft Excalibur

=== Excalibur ===
( Excalibur Aviation Company)

- Excalibur 800

=== Exkluziv ===
(Exkluziv sro, Topolcany, Slovakia)

- Exkluziv Joker

=== Exel ===
(George Exel, Clifton, NJ)

- Exel Model 100

=== Exosonic ===
- Exosonic 1.8

=== Explorair ===
(Ebringen, Breisgau-Hochschwarzwald, Baden-Württemberg, Germany)

- Explorair Relax MV

=== Explorer Aircraft ===
(Explorer Aircraft - now AEA)

- Explorer Aircraft Explorer 350R
- Explorer Aircraft Explorer 500T
- Explorer Aircraft Explorer 750T

=== Explorer ===
(Explorer Aviation, Grangeville, ID)

- Explorer Ellipse

=== Express ===
(Express Aircraft Co (Paul Fagerstrom & Lawrence Olson), Olympia, WA)

- Express Series 90
- Express Wheeler

=== Express Design Inc ===
- EDI Express
- EDI Loadmaster 3200

=== Extra ===
(Extra Flugzeugbau / Extra Aerobatic Aircraft / WalterExtra)

- Extra EA-200
- Extra EA-230
- Extra EA-260
- Extra EA-300
- Extra EA-330
- Extra EA-400
- Extra EA-500
- Extra NG (Extra Aerobatic Aircraft)

=== Eyerly ===
((Lee U) Eyerly Aircraft Corp, Eyerly School of Aeronautics, Salem, OR)

- Eyerly Sport
- Eyerly Monoplane
- Eyerly Whiffle Hen
- Eyerly-Lee Comet
