= Richard Engle =

Richard Engle may refer to:

- Rick Engle (born 1957), Major League Baseball pitcher
- Richard B. Engle, founder of Engle Aircraft Corp.; see List of aircraft (E)

== See also ==
- Richard Engel (disambiguation)
