= Richard Engel (disambiguation) =

Richard Engel (born 1973) is an American journalist.

Richard Engel, Rich Engel, Rick Engel, or Dick Engel may refer to:

- Dick Engel, manager of Bibletone Records
- Richard Engel, Canadian teacher who helper popularize Sepak takraw in Canada
- Rich Engel, 2012 parade marshal at Picnic Day (UC Davis)
- Rich Engel, interviewee about singer Angela Bofill; see List of Unsung episodes

== See also ==
- Richard Engle (disambiguation)
- Richard Engels (disambiguation)
- Richard Stengel (born c. 1955), American editor, journalist and author
