= Richard Engels (disambiguation) =

- Horus Engels (1914–1991), German painter
- Richard Engels, American politician, state representative in South Dakota
- Rick Engles (born 1954), professional American football player

== See also ==
- Richard Engel (disambiguation)
