= Pöschel Equator =

Amphibian aircraft

Equator
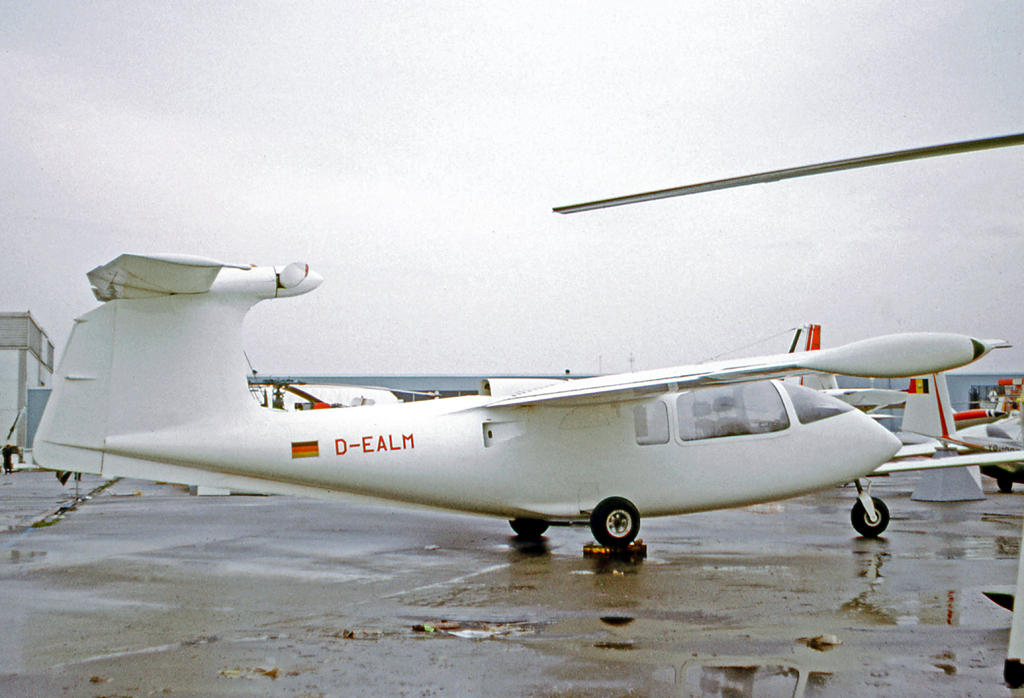
- The P-300 Equator prototype on display at the 1973 Paris Air Show

General information
- Type: Amphibious executive aircraft
- National origin: Germany
- Manufacturer: Pöschel Aircraft, later Equator Aircraft (Germany)
- Designer: Günther Pöschel
- Number built: 3

History
- First flight: 8 November 1970

The Pöschel Equator was a single engine, 6/8 seat amphibious aircraft built in the 1970s featuring glass-fibre covered fuselage. Three aircraft were built, each with different engine or wing positions, but no production followed.

== Design and development ==
Günther Pöschel designed the Equator as a small executive transport which could operate from land or water. It used the then quite novel glass-fibre composite material for the skin of its flying surfaces and fuselage in order to achieve a smooth and watertight finish. The first version to fly, the P-300 Equator, was completed as a landplane with a fixed undercarriage and was intended to provide proof of principle. It had a high, cantilever wing of straight tapered plan and no dihedral, carrying a full span combination of ailerons and slotted flaps. These surfaces replaced the original full span flaps plus lateral control spoilers, which were found ineffective. Despite its landplane configuration, this first aircraft had the small outboard floats intended for production amphibians; these rotated to the wingtips in flight and remained rotated for land operation.

The P-300 Equator's fuselage was a composite skinned, metal semi-monocoque structure. The cabin extended from near the nose to just aft of the wing leading edge. Three rows of seats were enclosed by a long, smooth windscreen and two long side transparencies which hinged upwards for access, with two smaller windows behind. The most unusual feature of the P-300 was its engine and propeller layout: the six cylinder, 310 hp (230 hp) Lycoming TIO-541 was placed within the fuselage behind the cabin, with a long drive shaft extending aft to the tail. The P-300 had a T-tail and the drive shaft first turned through 90°upwards into it, then turned again to emerge from a slender fairing at the fin/tailplane intersection, where it drove a two blade, tractor configuration propeller. The tail was unswept, carrying horn balanced elevators and rudder. The fixed, tricycle undercarriage had short, almost horizontal, cantilever main legs; all wheels had fairings. The prototype P-300 was exhibited at the June 1973 Paris Air Show at Le Bourget Airport.

The P-300 was followed by the P-400 Turbo-Equator, powered by a 313 kW (420 hp) Allison 250-25-B17B turboprop engine. Lighter and small in diameter than the Lycoming, this engine was mounted on a revised, cruciform, tail at the fin/ tailplane intersection, driving a three blade propeller. A new, all-moving tabbed tailplane was fitted and the rudder had gained a trim tab. The displacement of the engine from the fuselage enabled another row of seats to be added, making eight places in all. The cabin had a glazed door in place of the P-300's hinged transparencies. The wings had the same plan and dimensions as before but were fitted with the earlier, full span spoilerons. The wingtip floats were removed and the aircraft stabilized on water with short fuselage mounted sponsons. A retractable tricycle undercarriage was fitted, the wheels housed within the fuselage.

The P-400 first flew on 24 August 1977 but was destroyed during its eighth land take-off when the propeller went into reverse pitch.

The final Equator, numbered P-300 like the first, reverted to Lycoming piston power but with the engine mounted in pusher configuration on a pylon above the fuselage and wing, partly to allow later models to use different engines or even to have two engines in push-pull configuration. The sponsons were removed and wing roots were lowered to below mid-fuselage line and dihedral added, stabilizing the aircraft on the water with a "water-wing", the centre section undersides in contact with the water, an idea developed by the US Navy and used in the Taylor Coot homebuilt amphibian. The earlier upright fin was replaced by a wide chord, swept but still cruciform tail. The new wing position resulted in a revision of the cabin side transparencies, with three well-spaced square windows on each side. Cabin access was via a portside door.

Some water trials had been made by March 1981 and one P-300 is known to have flown from land. Many variants were proposed but not proceeded with.

== Variants ==
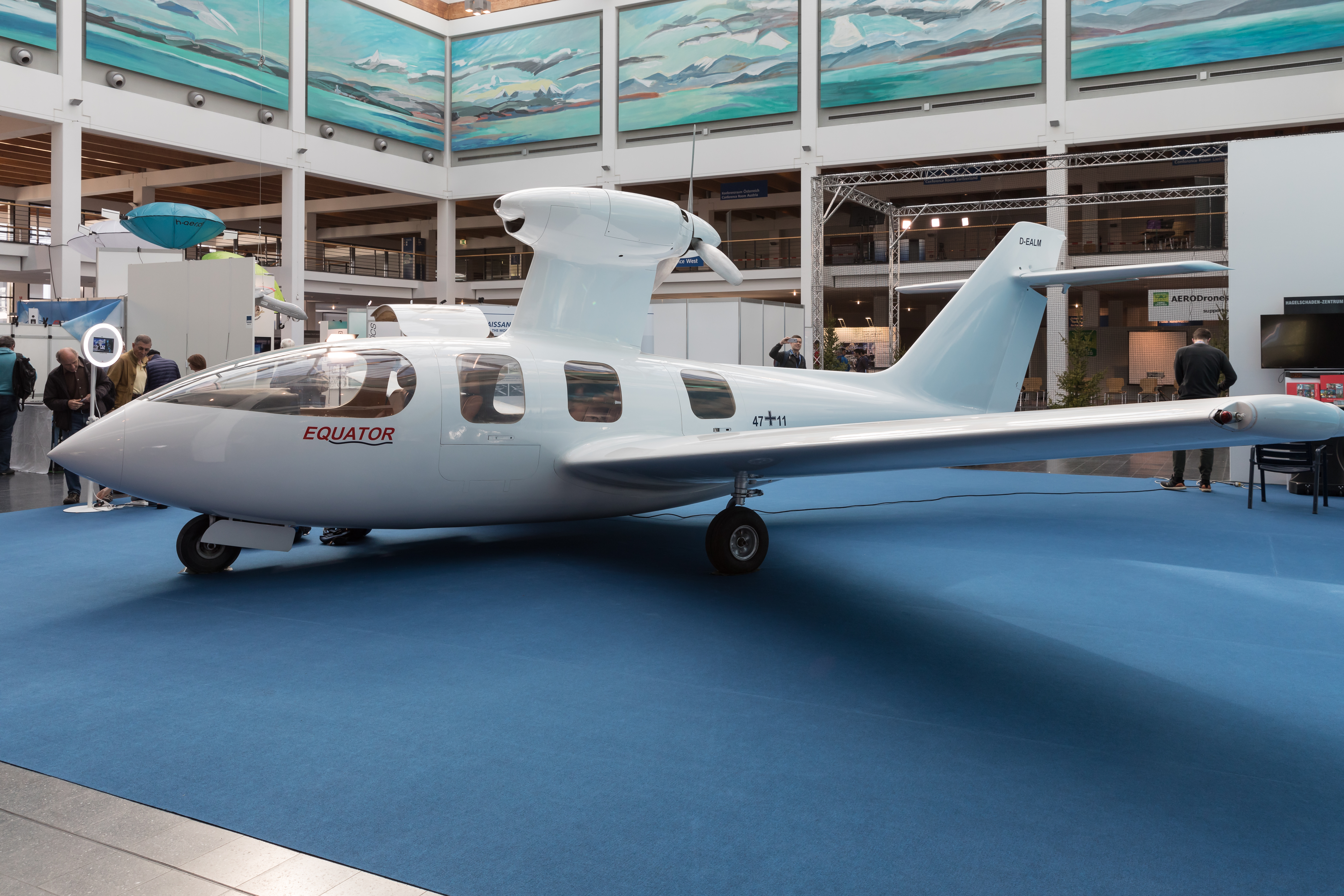
Mid wing versionof the P-300 Equator

- Equator P-300 Equator
- Equator P-350 Equator
- Equator P-400 Equator
- Equator P-420 Turbo Equator
- Equator P-420 Twin Equator
- Equator P-450 Equator
- Equator P-550 Turbo Equator
- Equator P2 Excursion
- Equator P1300 Equator

Version offered in 2015 as a modular aircraft with 2 to 20 seats.

== Specifications (first P-300) ==
Data from Jane's All the World's Aircraft 1972/3

General characteristics

- Crew: 1
- Capacity: up to 5 passengers
- Length: 8.53 m (28 ft 0 in)
- Wingspan: 12.40 m (40 ft 8 in)
- Height: 3.10 m (10 ft 2 in)
- Wing area: 18.0 m^{2} (194 sq ft) gross
- Airfoil: Wortmann laminar flow
- Empty weight: 800 kg (1,764 lb)
- Max takeoff weight: 1,800 kg (3,968 lb)
- Fuel capacity: 800 L (211 US gal; 176 Imp gal)
- Powerplant: 1 × Lycoming TIO-541 6-cylinder horizontally opposed, turbocharged, 230 kW (310 hp)
- Propellers: 2-bladed Hartzell Propeller, 2.40 m (7 ft 10 in) diameter constant speed, reversible pitch, mounted on T-tail in tractor configuration and driven via long drive shaft.

Performance

- Maximum speed: 387 km/h (240 mph, 209 kn) at sea level
- Cruise speed: 450 km/h (280 mph, 240 kn) at 75% power at 7,300 m (23,950 ft)
- Stall speed: 90 km/h (56 mph, 49 kn)
- Range: 5,400 km (3,400 mi, 2,900 nmi) at 75% power at 7,300 m (23,950 ft)
- Service ceiling: 9,000 m (30,000 ft)
- Rate of climb: 8.65 m/s (1,703 ft/min)

== Bibliography ==
- Taylor, John W R (1972). Jane's All the World's Aircraft 1972-73. London: Sampson Low, Marston & Co. Ltd. pp. 94–5. ISBN 0-354-00109-4.
- Taylor, John W R (1973). Jane's All the World's Aircraft 1976-77. London: Jane's Yearbooks. ISBN 0-354-00538-3.
- Taylor, John W R (1983). Jane's All the World's Aircraft 1982-83. London: Jane's Yearbooks.
- "Composite Amphibian". Flight. Vol. 119, no. 3751. 28 March 1981. p. 908.
