= EasyUp =

American aircraft manufacturer

- Type: Privately held company
- Industry: Aerospace
- Founded: 1990s
- Founder: Tom Tate
- Fate: Out of business
- Headquarters: Medford, Oregon, United States
- Products: Aircraft plans
- Website: easyup.cc

EasyUp was an American aircraft manufacturer founded by professional engineer Tom Tate in the 1990s and based in Medford, Oregon. The company specialized in the design and manufacture of paramotors in the form of plans and kits for amateur construction under the US FAR 103 Ultralight Vehicles rules and the European microlight category.

The company's sole product was plans, and later kits, for the EasyUp Parapropter, a paramotor design using a wide variety of small gasoline engines. The plans consisted of full-sized 24 in (61 cm) by 36 in (91 cm) inch professional blueprints.

The business was eventually wound up, with Tate writing, "I have moved on to much bigger and better things."

== Aircraft ==
Summary of aircraft built by EasyUp
Model name	First flight	Number built	Type
EasyUp Parapropter	mid-2000s		Paramotor
