= Europe Sails =

Austrian aircraft manufacturer

- Industry: Aerospace
- Headquarters: Neukirchen am Großvenediger, Austria
- Products: hang gliders
- Website: www.europe-sails.de

Europe Sails is an Austrian aircraft manufacturer, based in Neukirchen am Großvenediger. The company specializes in hang gliders.

In 2003 the company offered a complete line of four types of hang gliders, but by 2012 the Independent competition hang glider was their sole product.

== Aircraft ==
Summary of aircraft built by Europe Sails
Model name	First flight	Number built	Type
Europe Sails Excel			hang glider
Europe Sails Hyper			hang glider
Europe Sails Independent	2003		hang glider
Europe Sails Special Dimensione			hang glider
