= Eagle EA-100 =

American light aircraft

EA-100 S-LSA
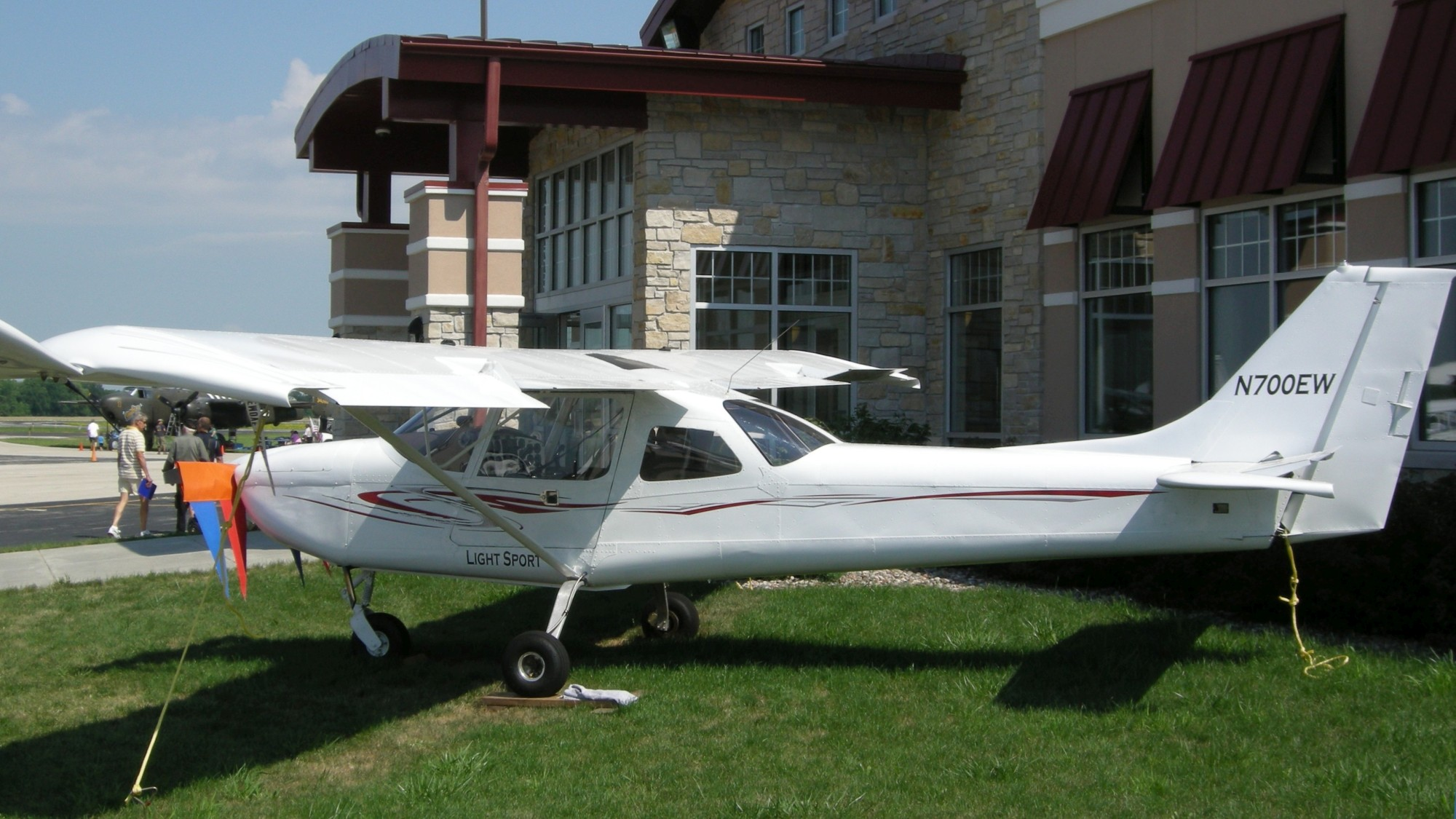

General information
- Type: Light-sport aircraft
- National origin: United States
- Manufacturer: Eagle Aviation LLC
- Status: Production completed
- Number built: 2

History
- Manufactured: 2008-2013
- Introduction date: 2008

The Eagle EA-100 is an American light-sport aircraft that was designed and produced by Eagle Aviation LLC of Oshkosh, Wisconsin and introduced in 2008. When available, it was supplied as a complete ready-to-fly-aircraft.

The company website expired in March 2013 and was not renewed. It is likely that the company is out of business and production has ended.

== Design and development ==
The EA-100 was designed to comply with the U.S. light-sport aircraft regulations and features a strut-braced high-wing, a two-seats-in-side-by-side enclosed cockpit accessed through two vertical hinged doors, fixed tricycle landing gear, and a single engine in tractor configuration.

The aircraft is made from aluminum sheet. Its 28.5 ft (8.7 m) span wing has an area of 135 sq ft (12.5 m^{2}) and features electrically operated flaps. The standard engine is the 100 hp (75 kW) Rotax 912ULS four-stroke powerplant while the standard propeller is a Sensenich composite ground adjustable type.

== Operational history ==
By August 2019 two examples had been registered with the US Federal Aviation Administration.

== Specifications (version) ==
Data from Bayerl and Eagle Aviation LLC

General characteristics

- Crew: one
- Capacity: one passenger
- Length: 20 ft 9 in (6.32 m)
- Wingspan: 28 ft 6 in (8.69 m)
- Height: 7 ft 3 in (2.21 m)
- Wing area: 135 sq ft (12.5 m^{2})
- Empty weight: 825 lb (374 kg)
- Gross weight: 1,320 lb (599 kg)
- Fuel capacity: 75 litres (16 imp gal; 20 US gal)
- Powerplant: 1 × Rotax 912ULS four cylinder, liquid and air-cooled, four stroke aircraft engine, 101 hp (75 kW)
- Propellers: 2-bladed Sensenich composite, ground adjustable

Performance

- Cruise speed: 105 kn (121 mph, 194 km/h)
- Stall speed: 35 kn (40 mph, 65 km/h) flaps down
- Never exceed speed: 120 kn (140 mph, 220 km/h)
- Range: 335 nmi (386 mi, 620 km)
- Service ceiling: 10,000 ft (3,000 m)
- g limits: +5/-3g
- Rate of climb: 1,200 ft/min (6.1 m/s)
