= Eurofly Fire Fox =

Italian ultralight aircraft

Fire Fox
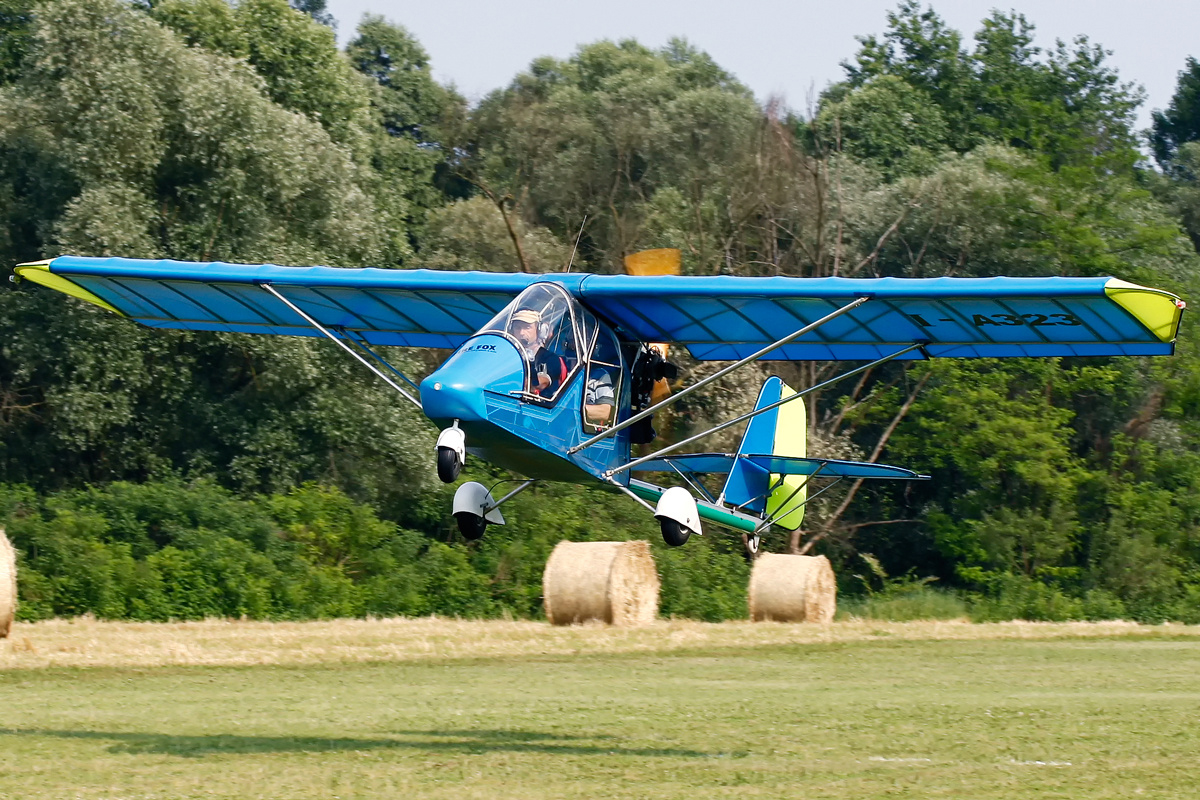
- Eurofly Fire Fox taking off from an airfield in Italy.

General information
- Type: Ultralight aircraft
- National origin: Italy
- Manufacturer: Eurofly srl
- Status: In production (2013)

The Eurofly Fire Fox (sometimes Firefox) is an Italian ultralight aircraft designed and produced by Eurofly srl of Galliera Veneta. The aircraft is supplied as a complete ready-to-fly-aircraft or as a kit for amateur construction.

== Design and development ==
The aircraft was designed to comply with the Fédération Aéronautique Internationale microlight category, including the category's maximum gross weight of 450 kg (992 lb). The Fire Fox features a strut-braced high-wing, a two-seats-in-tandem enclosed cockpit, fixed tricycle landing gear with wheel pants and a single engine in pusher configuration.

The aircraft is made from a combination of ALS 500 steel tubing and 6082 aluminium alloy tubing, with its flying surfaces covered in Dacron sailcloth. Its 9.60 m (31.5 ft) span wing lacks flaps and has a wing area of 16.09 m^{2} (173.2 sq ft). Each wing is supported by two parallel struts with jury struts. The standard engine used is the 50 hp (37 kW) Rotax 503 two-stroke powerplant.

The Fire Fox has a typical empty weight of 220 kg (490 lb) and a gross weight of 450 kg (990 lb), giving a useful load of 230 kg (510 lb). With full fuel of 49 litres (11 imp gal; 13 US gal) the payload for pilot, passengers and baggage is 194 kg (428 lb).

== Variants ==
Fire Fox
Base model
Fire Fox 2000
Fully equipped variant including electric flaps.

== Specifications (Fire Fox) ==
Data from AeroCrafter and Eurofly srl

General characteristics

- Crew: one
- Capacity: one passenger
- Length: 6.20 m (20.33 ft)
- Wingspan: 9.60 m (31.48 ft)
- Height: 1.85 m (6 ft 1 in)
- Wing area: 16.09 m^{2} (173.2 sq ft)
- Empty weight: 220 kg (484 lb)
- Gross weight: 450 kg (992 lb)
- Fuel capacity: 50 litres (11 imp gal; 13 US gal)
- Powerplant: 1 × Rotax 503 twin cylinder, air-cooled, two stroke aircraft engine, 37 kW (50 hp)
- Propellers: 2-bladed composite

Performance

- Maximum speed: 130 km/h (81 mph, 70 kn)
- Cruise speed: 90 km/h (56 mph, 49 kn)
- Stall speed: 45 km/h (28 mph, 24 kn)
- g limits: +6/-4
- Maximum glide ratio: 8:1 at 100 km/h (62 mph)
- Rate of climb: 5.00 m/s (984 ft/min)
- Rate of sink: 2.0 m/s (390 ft/min) at 90 km/h (55 mph)
- Wing loading: 28 kg/m^{2} (5.7 lb/sq ft)
