= Engineers Aircraft Corporation EAC-1 =

EAC-1
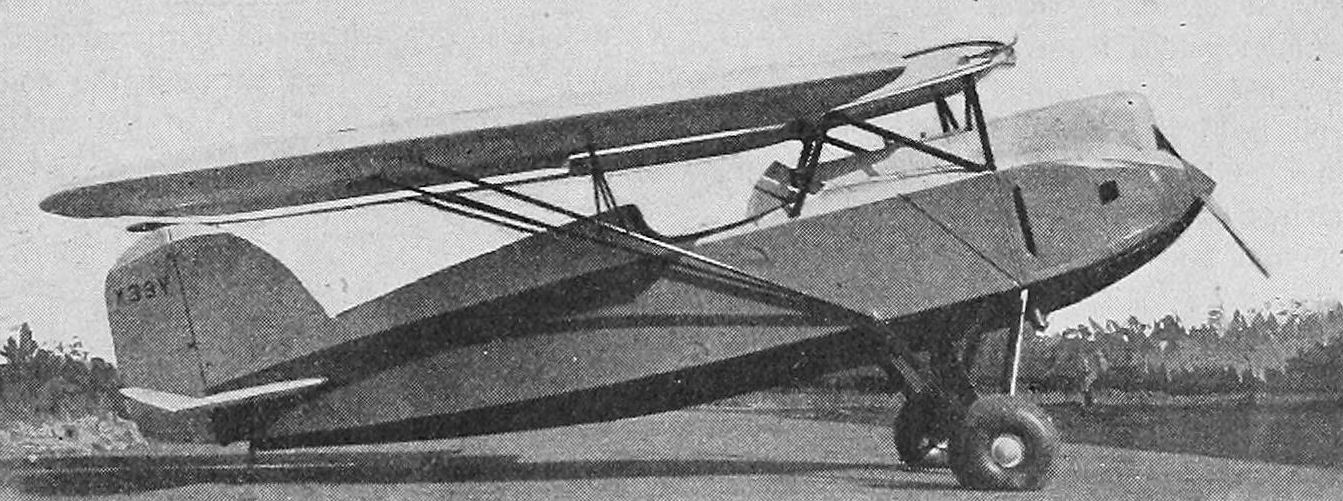

General information
- Type: Sport parasol
- National origin: United States of America
- Manufacturer: Engineers Aircraft Corporation

History
- Introduction date: 1930

The EAC-1 is a folding-parasol wing aircraft developed by the Engineers Aircraft Corporation of Stamford, Connecticut.

== Design and development ==
The EAC-1 was designed to be a low-cost sport aircraft for casual use, that could be stored in a space as small as 11 X 20 feet.

The aircraft has conventional landing gear, an open cockpit, strut braces and a parasol wing with swept sections. The fuselage is constructed of welded steel tubing with doped aircraft fabric covering.

== Specifications (EAC-1) ==
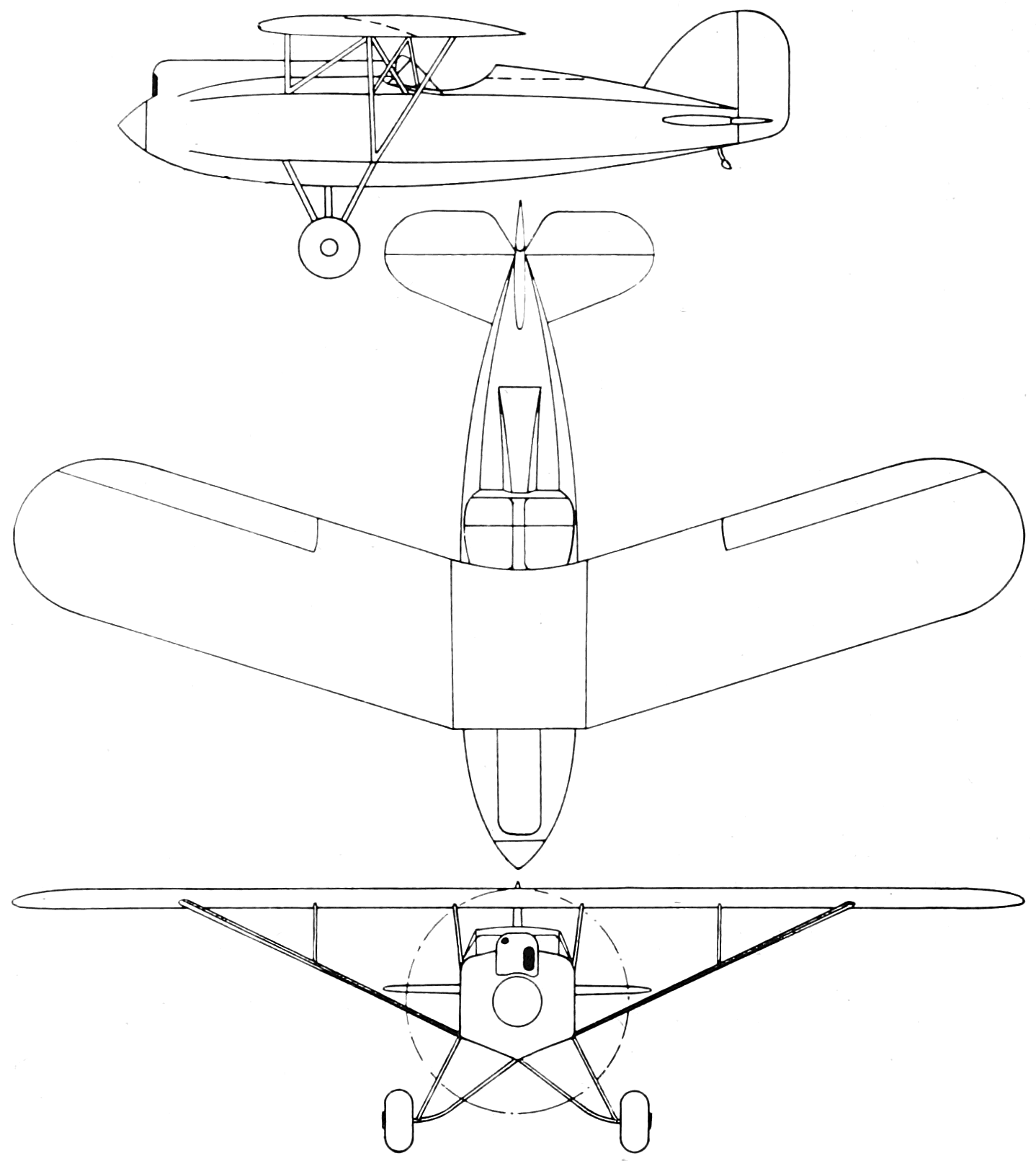
3 view drawing

Data from Popular Aviation

General characteristics

- Crew: one
- Capacity: one
- Wingspan: 30 ft (9.1 m)
- Powerplant: 1 × Wright Gipsy , 90 hp (67 kW)

Performance

- Maximum speed: 100 kn (120 mph, 190 km/h)
- Cruise speed: 87 kn (100 mph, 160 km/h)
- Stall speed: 39 kn (45 mph, 72 km/h)

== See also ==
Aircraft of comparable role, configuration, and era

- Heath Parasol
