= EuroFAR =

European Future Advanced Rotorcraft (EuroFAR) was a proposed tiltrotor aircraft that was pursued during the 1980s and 1990s. It was a collaborative programme undertaken by the EuroFAR consortium, which comprised Aerospatiale, Agusta, Aeritalia, Messerschmitt-Bölkow-Blohm, Westland, and Construcciones Aeronáuticas SA (CASA).

Work on EuroFAR started during the mid-1980s in response to the innovative Bell-Boeing V-22 Osprey, a military-orientated tiltrotor. A distinct difference of EuroFAR was the primary pursuit of the civilian market, although some considerations were made towards its potential military operation as well. The programme was officially launched in late 1987, sponsored by the European technological research programme Eureka. Work progressed to the second phase in early 1994. By this point, the consortium was aware of the competing Bell BA609 as well as the V-22; interest in other platforms, such as compound helicopters, drew attention away from EuroFAR. During the late 1990s, work was abandoned in favour of other initiatives.

== Development ==
During the 1980s, various aerospace manufacturers became interested in the Bell-Boeing V-22 Osprey, an in-development tiltrotor designed for the use of the United States military. Several European manufacturers opted to collaboratively pursue development of their own tiltrotor for civil purposes; this ambition led to the creation of the EuroFAR consortium in August 1986, which was named after their proposed aircraft, the European Future Advanced Rotorcraft. Members of the consortium included France's Aerospatiale, Italy's Agusta and Aeritalia, Germany's Messerschmitt-Bölkow-Blohm (MBB), the United Kingdom's Westland, and Spain's Construcciones Aeronáuticas SA (CASA). Of these, Aerospatiale and Agusta emerged as the leaders, both companies having considerable experience in the design and production of various helicopters. British Aerospace was initially involved as well, but had pulled out by 1987 to participate in the V-22 programme instead.

The EuroFAR was envisioned to be a civil-orientated tiltrotor, capable of carrying up to 19 passengers across a distance of 1,000 km while traversing at a cruising speed of 580kmph and a maximum altitude of 7,500 meters. For vertical take off performance, it would have had a maximum weight limit of ten tons, four of which would have been the payload; a less restrictive 13 ton maximum weight would be permitted for short take off operations only. The estimated fuel consumption rate was 1.2 kg per km flown. The forecast cost of the tiltrotor, according to the consortium, was 1.15 times that of conventional helicopters of comparable capacity.

Various potential uses for the tiltrotor had been envisioned, including its potential to serve city centres directly via airports that most conventional airliners could not use, such as London City Airport. One forecast had anticipated that 93% of all sales would be to the offshore oil and gas industry while as much as 40% of the EuroFAR's projected international sales were to come from the North American market. While it was primarily intended for civilian operators, Westland in particular was keen to promote the EuroFAR for military purposes as well. Multiple discussions with potential military operators were held, with one area of focus having reportedly been anti-submarine warfare. In addition to the tiltrotor itself, another official aim of the programme was the development of various technologies and innovations that could be transferred across to other aircraft and future projects, particularly the improvement of conventional rotorcraft.

Upon the consortium's creation, the group stated its intention to produce a technology demonstrator, for which the vast majority of funding would be provided initially via the framework of the European technological research programme Eureka. The member firms also financially contributed, as well as building upon their prior projects. In January 1987, a model of the proposed EuroFAR was publicly presented. It had been hoped that, with sufficient backing, that the demonstrator could by flying as early as 1991. However, government officials were largely non-committal to the project.

In late 1987, the programme was officially launched. Phase one involved a detailed preliminary study, experimental work to augment this study, and market research for the potential civil uses for the tiltrotor. Phase 2, which was launched in early 1994 after the technical feasibility had been demonstrated, was an evaluation of the industrial and financial risks, as well as the civil and military implications of EuroFAR. As the V-22 drew closer towards quantity production in the 1990s, the EuroFAR consortium reportedly felt increasing pressure to intensify their efforts on the programme.

During the late 1990s, the program reportedly was subject to a renewal of activity; Eurocopter projects manager Jean Renaurd stated that consortium had been concerned over the potential loss of sales to the rival Bell BA609 tiltrotor project. Over the following two years, various potential configurations underwent windtunnel testing in Toulouse using one-sixth scale models, which were intended to aid in determining the rotorcraft's definitive configuration. As late as 1999, funding requests were still being issued for the project. However, by July 1999, work on the EuroFAR had reportedly been deprioritised in favour of other projects; specifically, GKN Westland and Agusta put together a financing request to the European Commission for the development of a compound helicopter technology demonstrator. This division of attention eventually led to all work on EuroFAR being discontinued.

== Specifications ==
Data from Future Aeronautical and Space Systems (1997), pp. 62, 65

General characteristics

- Crew: Two pilots, one flight attendant
- Capacity: 30 passengers
- Length: 22.4 m (73 ft 6 in)
- Wingspan: 14.6 m (47 ft 11 in)
- Max takeoff weight: 15,000 kg (33,069 lb) VTOL: 13,650 kg (30,090 lb)
- Powerplant: 2 × Pratt & Whitney PW300 turboshaft, 3,185 kW (4,271 hp) each
- Main rotor diameter: × 11.2 m (36 ft 9 in)

Performance

- Cruise speed: 620 km/h (386 mph, 335 kn)
- Range: 1,230 km (764 mi, 664 nmi) with maximum standard fuel
- Rate of climb: 11 m/s (2,200 ft/min)

== See also ==
- AgustaWestland AW609
- Bell Boeing V-22 Osprey

== Bibliography ==
- "Europeans plan civil tiltrotor technology demonstrator". Helicopter News. Vol. 22, no. 5. 1 March 1996. p. 1. ISSN 0363-8227 – via Factiva.
- Martini, A.; Renaud, J. (24–27 May 1993). Le convertible type EuroFAR: Vue d'ensemble des avancements techniques et missions futures (PDF). Recent advances in long range and long endurance operation of aircraft. Flight Mechanics Panel Symposium. AGARD conference proceedings (in French). Vol. 547. Kijkduin (The Hague), Netherlands: North Atlantic Treaty Organization (NATO) (published November 1993). pp. 10–1 to 10–6. ISBN 92-835-0726-6. ISSN 0549-7191. OCLC 197117575. Archived (PDF) from the original on 19 April 2021.
- Tardif, Christel (18–24 January 1993). "EUROFAR enters demonstrator phase". West Europe: Aerospace. Science & Technology: Europe/International. JPRS Report. Vol. JPRS-EST-93-006-L. Translated by Foreign Broadcast Information Service (FBIS) (published 22 February 1993). Air & Cosmos. pp. 3–4. hdl:2027/nyp.33433017047170.
- Renaud, J.; Huber, H.; Venn, G. (24–27 September 1991). The EuroFAR program: An European overview on advanced VTOL civil transportation system (PDF). European rotorcraft forum (17th ed.). Berlin, Germany. hdl:20.500.11881/3387. OCLC 256210503.
- Andres, J.; Renaud, J. (February 1989). "EUROFAR — An advanced rotorcraft programme is under way" (DjVu). ICAO bulletin: Official magazine of international civil aviation. Vol. 44, no. 2. pp. 15–18. ISSN 0018-8778.
  - "ICAO Journal". International Civil Aviation Organization.
