= Emair MA-1 =

American agricultural aircraft

Paymaster / Diablo 1200
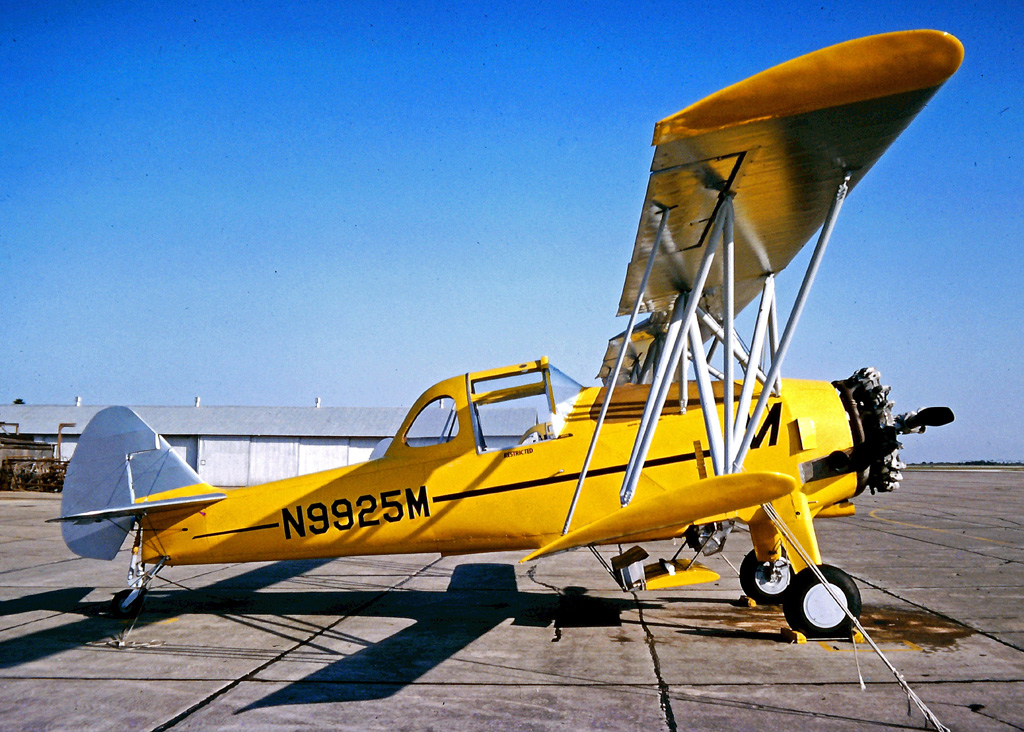
- Emair MA-1B at Harlingen Texas in 1975

General information
- Type: Agricultural biplane
- Manufacturer: Emair
- Number built: 73

History
- First flight: 1969

The Emair MA-1 Paymaster was a 1960s American agricultural biplane aircraft built by Emair, which was part of the Hawaiian Murray company. The prototype was constructed and flown in New Zealand, with production aircraft built in the United States at Harlingen, Texas.

== Development ==
The prototype Murrayair MA-1 was built by Air New Zealand on behalf of Murrayair Limited of Hawaii, United States. Based on the Stearman 75 Kaydet, it had an increased wing area and modification to the forward fuselage to accommodate a pilot (in a raised cockpit for better visibility), a jump seat (used to carry an assistant or mechanic between stations), and a chemical hopper. The fixed tailwheel landing gear was strengthened and a more powerful Pratt & Whitney Wasp radial engine fitted. It first flew in New Zealand on 27 July 1969, then it was dismantled and shipped to Hawaii to obtain United States type certification; certification was awarded on 14 April 1970.

== Production and development ==
Emair began production of the aircraft at Harlingen in Texas. The production aircraft were named Agronemair MA-1 Paymaster at first, then designated the Emair MA-1 Paymaster. Production ended in 1976 after 25 had been built.

In 1975 Emair developed an improved version, the Emair MA-1B Diablo 1200, which was essentially an MA-1 with a more powerful Wright R-1820 radial engine. The more powerful engine did not increase the maximum takeoff weight but allowed operations at higher altitudes, and its lower output speed helped reduce propeller noise.

Forty-eight MA-1s had been built by early 1980, with production being suspended by the end of the year due to poor market conditions. At the end of the 1980s the company halted production after a further 23 Diablos had been built.

== Variants ==
Murrayair MA-1
New Zealand-built prototype with a 600hp (447kW) Pratt & Whitney R-1340-AN1 Wasp radial engine.
Emair MA-1 Paymaster
Production aircraft, 25 built.
Emair MA-1B Diablo 1200
Improved version with a 900hp (671 kW) de-rated Wright R-1820 radial engine, 48 built.

== Specifications (Diablo 1200) ==
Data from Jane's All The World's Aircraft 1980–81

General characteristics

- Crew: One
- Capacity: 475 US gal (396 imp gal; 1,800 L) hopper, 3,000 lb (1,400 kg) load
- Length: 30 ft 0 in (9.14 m) (tail up)
- Upper wingspan: 41 ft 8 in (12.70 m)
- Lower wingspan: 35 ft 0 in (10.67 m)
- Height: 11 ft 9 in (3.58 m) (tail down)
- Wing area: 400 sq ft (37 m^{2})
- Airfoil: NACA 4412 (modified)
- Empty weight: 4,250 lb (1,928 kg)
- Max takeoff weight: 8,400 lb (3,810 kg)
- Powerplant: 1 × Wright R-1820 radial piston engine , 900 hp (670 kW) (derated from 1,200 hp (890 kW)
- Propellers: 3-bladed Hamilton Standard Hydromatic constant-speed propeller, 10 ft 0 in (3.05 m) diameter

Performance

- Maximum speed: 117 mph (188 km/h, 102 kn) CAS
- Stall speed: 53 mph (85 km/h, 46 kn) (power on)
- Never exceed speed: 148 mph (238 km/h, 129 kn) CAS
- Rate of climb: 1,700 ft/min (8.6 m/s)

== See also ==
Aircraft of comparable role, configuration, and era

- Grumman Ag Cat
- Snow S-2
