= Electricsports ES-Trike =

German electric ultralight trike

ES-Trike

General information
- Type: Ultralight trike
- National origin: Germany
- Manufacturer: Electricsports GmbH
- Status: In production (2018)

The Electricsports ES-Trike is a German electric-powered ultralight trike produced by Electricsports GmbH of Ostrach. The aircraft is supplied complete and ready-to-fly.

The design is a collaboration between Wolfgang Zanki, who specializes in carbon fibre composites, Toni Roth, who builds electric-powered harnesses and Meinrad Reisch, who builds electric paramotors.

== Design and development ==
In its single seat model, the ES-Trike was designed to comply with the Fédération Aéronautique Internationale microlight category, the German 120 kg class and the US FAR 103 Ultralight Vehicles rules.

The aircraft design features a cable-braced hang glider-style high-wing, weight-shift controls, a single-seat open cockpit with a cockpit fairing, tricycle landing gear and a single piston engine or electric motor in pusher configuration.

The airframe is made from carbon fibre and titanium, with its single or double surface wing covered in Dacron sailcloth. The wing is supported by a single tube-type kingpost and uses an "A" frame weight-shift control bar. The powerplants offered are the Polini Thor 100 or 200 piston engine or the Flytec HPD 10 electric motor of 13.5 kW (18 hp). The automatically folding carbon fibre propeller is mounted on a 70 cm (28 in) shaft to allow it to operate in less-disturbed air.

The airframe has a basic weight of 6 kg (13 lb), to which can be added the carbon fibre complete fuselage fairing, which weighs 1.5 kg (3 lb). With the motor and battery the weight is 25 to 28 kg (55 to 62 lb).

A number of different wings can be fitted to the basic carriage, including single and double surface wings. The aircraft's performance depends greatly on the wing that is selected.

== Variants ==
ES-Trike Mono
Base model with one seat.
ES-Trike Duo
Model with two seats.

== Specifications (ES-Trike Mono) ==
Data from Tacke

General characteristics

- Crew: one
- Powerplant: 1 × Flytec HPD 10 electric motor, 13.5 kW (18.1 hp)
- Propellers: 2-bladed carbon fibre, folding
