= Eastern Ultralights Snoop =

Snoop

General information
- Type: Ultralight aircraft
- National origin: United States
- Manufacturer: Eastern Ultralights
- Designer: Bob Able
- Status: Production completed

History
- Introduction date: 1981
- Developed from: Eipper Quicksilver

The Eastern Ultralights Snoop is a family of American ultralight aircraft that was designed by Bob Able and produced by Eastern Ultralights, starting in 1981. The aircraft was supplied as a kit for amateur construction.

== Design and development ==
The Snoop is characterized as a "Ripsilver" or unauthorized Eipper Quicksilver derivative. The aircraft was designed to comply with the US FAR 103 Ultralight Vehicles rules, including the category's maximum empty weight of 254 lb (115 kg). The aircraft has a standard empty weight of 238 lb (108 kg). It features a cable-braced high wing, a single-seat open cockpit, tricycle landing gear and a single engine in pusher configuration.

The aircraft is made from bolted-together aluminum tubing, with the flying surfaces covered in Dacron sailcloth. Its wing is cable-braced from an inverted "V" kingpost. The pilot is accommodated on an open seat and is provided with conventional three-axis flight controls. The landing gear includes suspension on all three wheels, but no nosewheel steering. The Cuyuna UL II engine is mounted on the wing leading edge and drives the pusher propeller which is located aft of the wing's trailing edge though an extension shaft. This arrangement allows the aircraft to remain sitting on its nosewheel while unoccupied, unlike most ultralight pusher aircraft.

== Variants ==
Snoop I
Single-seat model with spoilers used for roll control, a 33 ft (10.1 m) span wing and no flaps.
Snoop +
Single-seat model with ailerons used for roll control, a shorter wing and flaps.
Snoop II
Two-seat trainer model.

== Specifications (Snoop I) ==
Data from Cliche and the Virtual Ultralight Museum

General characteristics

- Crew: one
- Wingspan: 33 ft (10 m)
- Wing area: 165 sq ft (15.3 m^{2})
- Empty weight: 238 lb (108 kg)
- Gross weight: 518 lb (235 kg)
- Fuel capacity: 5 U.S. gallons (19 L; 4.2 imp gal)
- Powerplant: 1 × Cuyuna UL II twin cylinder, Two-stroke aircraft engine, 35 hp (26 kW)

Performance

- Maximum speed: 55 mph (89 km/h, 48 kn)
- Cruise speed: 45 mph (72 km/h, 39 kn)
- Stall speed: 18 mph (29 km/h, 16 kn)
- Never exceed speed: 55 mph (89 km/h, 48 kn)
- Range: 125 mi (201 km, 109 nmi)
- Service ceiling: 10,000 ft (3,000 m)
- g limits: +6/-4
- Rate of climb: 600 ft/min (3.0 m/s)
- Wing loading: 3.14 lb/sq ft (15.3 kg/m^{2})
