= Egvoyager Voyager 203 =

Italian ultralight aircraft

Voyager 203

General information
- Type: Ultralight aircraft
- National origin: Italy
- Manufacturer: Egvoyager
- Status: In production

History
- Introduction date: May 2010

The Egvoyager Voyager 203 is an Italian ultralight aircraft, designed and produced by Egvoyager and introduced in May 2011. The aircraft is supplied as a kit for amateur construction or as a complete ready-to-fly aircraft.

== Design and development ==
The aircraft was designed to comply with the Fédération Aéronautique Internationale microlight rules. It features a cantilever low wing, a two-seats-in-side-by-side configuration enclosed cockpit under a bubble canopy with gull-winged doors, fixed, or optionally retractable, tricycle landing gear and a single engine in tractor configuration.

The aircraft is made from composites. Its 8.0 m (26.2 ft) span wing employs flaps. The standard engine available is a 100 hp (75 kW) Rotax 912ULS four-stroke powerplant. The basic model is the Voyager Fly, with the Voyager Club and the Voyager Style being models with options included as standard equipment.

A light-sport aircraft category version is planned for the United States market.

== Variants ==
Voyager 203 CF
Fixed landing gear model
Voyager 203 CR
Retractable landing gear model, at an additional cost of €7000.

== Specifications (Voyager 203) ==
Data from Bayerl

General characteristics

- Crew: one
- Capacity: one passenger
- Wingspan: 8.0 m (26 ft 3 in)
- Empty weight: 278 kg (613 lb)
- Gross weight: 472.5 kg (1,042 lb)
- Fuel capacity: 88 litres (19 imp gal; 23 US gal)
- Powerplant: 1 × Rotax 912ULS four cylinder, liquid and air-cooled, four stroke aircraft engine, 75 kW (101 hp)

Performance

- Cruise speed: 240 km/h (150 mph, 130 kn)
- Stall speed: 63 km/h (39 mph, 34 kn)
- Never exceed speed: 300 km/h (190 mph, 160 kn)
- Rate of climb: 7 m/s (1,400 ft/min)
