= EasyUp Parapropter =

American paramotor

General information
- Type: Powered parachute
- National origin: United States
- Manufacturer: EasyUp
- Designer: Tom Tate
- Status: Plans no longer available (2015)

The EasyUp Parapropter is an American paramotor that was designed by Tom Tate and produced by EasyUp of Medford, Oregon. Now out of production, when it was available the aircraft was supplied in the form of blueprint-style plans and an instruction manual for amateur construction. A kit was also available at one time.

== Design and development ==
The Parapropter was designed as an inexpensive way for beginners to start flying and complies with the US FAR 103 Ultralight Vehicles rules. It features a paraglider-style wing, single-place accommodation and a single engine in pusher configuration. As is the case with all paramotors, takeoff and landing is accomplished by foot.

The aircraft plans allow the builder to create the backpack portion of the aircraft, including the propeller cage, built from bolted and welded aluminium plate and tubing. The plans recommend purchasing a used paraglider canopy to save money and a variety of engines can be fitted. The recommended propeller is a wooden fixed-pitch unit. Inflight steering is accomplished via handles that actuate the canopy brakes, creating roll and yaw.

The standard day, sea level, no wind takeoff with a typical engine and canopy is 30 ft (9.1 m) and the landing distance is 1 ft (0.3 m).

The designer estimated the construction time from the supplied plans to be 40 hours.

== Operational history ==
By 1998 the company reported that 750 sets of plans had been sold.

== Specifications (Parapropter, typical engine and canopy) ==
Data from Purdy

General characteristics

- Crew: one
- Length: 4 ft (1.2 m)
- Empty weight: 55 lb (25 kg)
- Fuel capacity: 5 U.S. gallons (19 L; 4.2 imp gal)
- Powerplant: 1 × single cylinder, two-stroke, air-cooled aircraft engine
- Propellers: 2-bladed wooden, fixed pitch

Performance

- Maximum speed: 25 mph (40 km/h, 22 kn)
- Cruise speed: 25 mph (40 km/h, 22 kn)
- Range: 100 mi (160 km, 87 nmi)
- Service ceiling: 10,000 ft (3,000 m)
- Rate of climb: 500 ft/min (2.5 m/s)
