= Eurofly FB5 Star Light =

Star Light

General information
- Type: Two seat ultralight
- National origin: Italy
- Manufacturer: Euro Fly srl

The Eurofly FB5 Star Light is a single engine kit built Italian ultralight, seating two side by side. It first flew in the late 2000s.

== Design and development ==
The latest in Eurofly's range of light aircraft, the Star Light is a conventionally laid out, single engine, low wing monoplane seating two side by side. It is a kit built ultralight with a fabric covered metal frame, steel in the cockpit area and with alloy fuselage longerons. The wings have constant chord and square tips; inboard flaps are fitted. The fuselage is flat sided, though with a deep rounded decking which merges into the rear of the large, one piece cockpit canopy. This decking tapers towards the tail where the tailplane, with swept leading edges and straight tips and carrying elevators with straight trailing edges, is mounted on the top of the fuselage. The fin has a similar shape to the tailplane, though the rudder hinge and trailing edge are also slightly swept. The rudder extends to the bottom of the fuselage, moving in a cut-out between the elevators.

The Star Light can be powered by one of two variants of the Rotax 912 flat four piston engines: either the 60 kW (80 hp) UL or the 73.5 kW (99 hp) ULS. It has a fixed tricycle undercarriage, with mainwheels spring mounted from the fuselage and a castoring nosewheel. The landing gear is fabricated from Zicral alloy bars to provide adequate suspension. Wheel fairings may be fitted.

== Operational history ==
At least 12 Star Lights were operational in Italy by mid-2010. Another has been on the Spanish register since early 2009.

== Specifications (FB5 Star Light) ==
Data from Jane's All the World's Aircraft 2011/12

General characteristics

- Capacity: 2
- Length: 6.60 m (21 ft 8 in)
- Wingspan: 8.35 m (27 ft 5 in)
- Height: 2.05 m (6 ft 9 in)
- Wing area: 11.48 m^{2} (123.6 sq ft)
- Empty weight: 282 kg (622 lb)
- Gross weight: 450 kg (992 lb)
- Fuel capacity: 60 L (13.2 Imp gal, 15.9 US gal) usable
- Powerplant: 1 × Rotax 912 UL flat four piston engine, air and liquid cooled, 59.6 kW (79.9 hp)
- Propellers: 3-bladed composite

Performance

- Maximum speed: 225 km/h (140 mph, 121 kn)
- Cruise speed: 190 km/h (120 mph, 100 kn)
- Stall speed: 58 km/h (36 mph, 31 kn) flaps down
- g limits: +6/-4
- Rate of climb: 5.7 m/s (1,120 ft/min) maximum at sea level
