= Explorair =

German aircraft manufacturer

- Company type: Privately held company
- Industry: Aerospace
- Founded: 2002
- Founder: Mathias Mauch
- Defunct: 2004
- Fate: Out of business
- Headquarters: Ebringen, Breisgau-Hochschwarzwald, Baden-Württemberg, Germany
- Products: Powered parachutes Ultralight trikes

Explorair was a German aircraft manufacturer based in Ebringen, Breisgau-Hochschwarzwald in Baden-Württemberg and later in Lörrach in Baden-Württemberg and founded by Mathias Mauch. The company specialized in the design and manufacture of powered parachutes and ultralight trikes in the form of ready-to-fly aircraft for the US FAR 103 Ultralight Vehicles and the European Fédération Aéronautique Internationale microlight categories.

Explorair seems to have been founded about 2002 and gone out of business in 2004.

The company produced the Explorair Relax MV, a single-seat powered parachute that could be converted to an ultralight trike by substituting a hang glider wing for the parachute wing.

== Aircraft ==
Summary of aircraft built by Explorair
Model name	First flight	Number built	Type
Explorair Relax MV	2002		Single-seat powered parachute and ultralight trike
