= Eagle Helicopter Eagle II =

Eagle II and Eagle III

General information
- Type: Recreational helicopter
- Manufacturer: Eagle Helicopter
- Number built: 2

The Eagle Helicopter Eagle II and Eagle III were light helicopters developed in the United States in the early 1980s. With side-by-side seating for two, they had an unusual boxy fuselage shaped like a stubby wedge. No anti-torque system was required, since the rotors of both aircraft were powered by tip jets. In the case of the Eagle II, the tip jets were "cold", fed with compressed air generated by an Evinrude piston engine, while the Eagle III's rotor was driven by more conventional propane-burning jets. Development did not progress beyond the construction of a prototype in each configuration.

== Specifications (Eagle II) ==
General characteristics

- Crew: one pilot
- Capacity: one passenger
- Length: 12 ft 1 in (3.69 m)
- Height: 7 ft 0 in (2.13 m)
- Wing area: 1,017 sq ft (94.5 m^{2})
- Empty weight: 750 lb (340 kg)
- Gross weight: 1,550 lb (703 kg)
- Powerplant: 1 × Evinrude 200749 outboard motor supplying compressed air , 235 hp (175 kW)
- Main rotor diameter: 36 ft 0 in (10.97 m)

Performance

- Cruise speed: 90 mph (145 km/h, 78 kn)
- Range: 200 mi (322 km, 170 nmi)
- Service ceiling: 15,000 ft (4,575 m)
- Rate of climb: 1,030 ft/min (5.2 m/s)
