= Grumman Ag Cat =

Single-engine agricultural biplane

Ag Cat
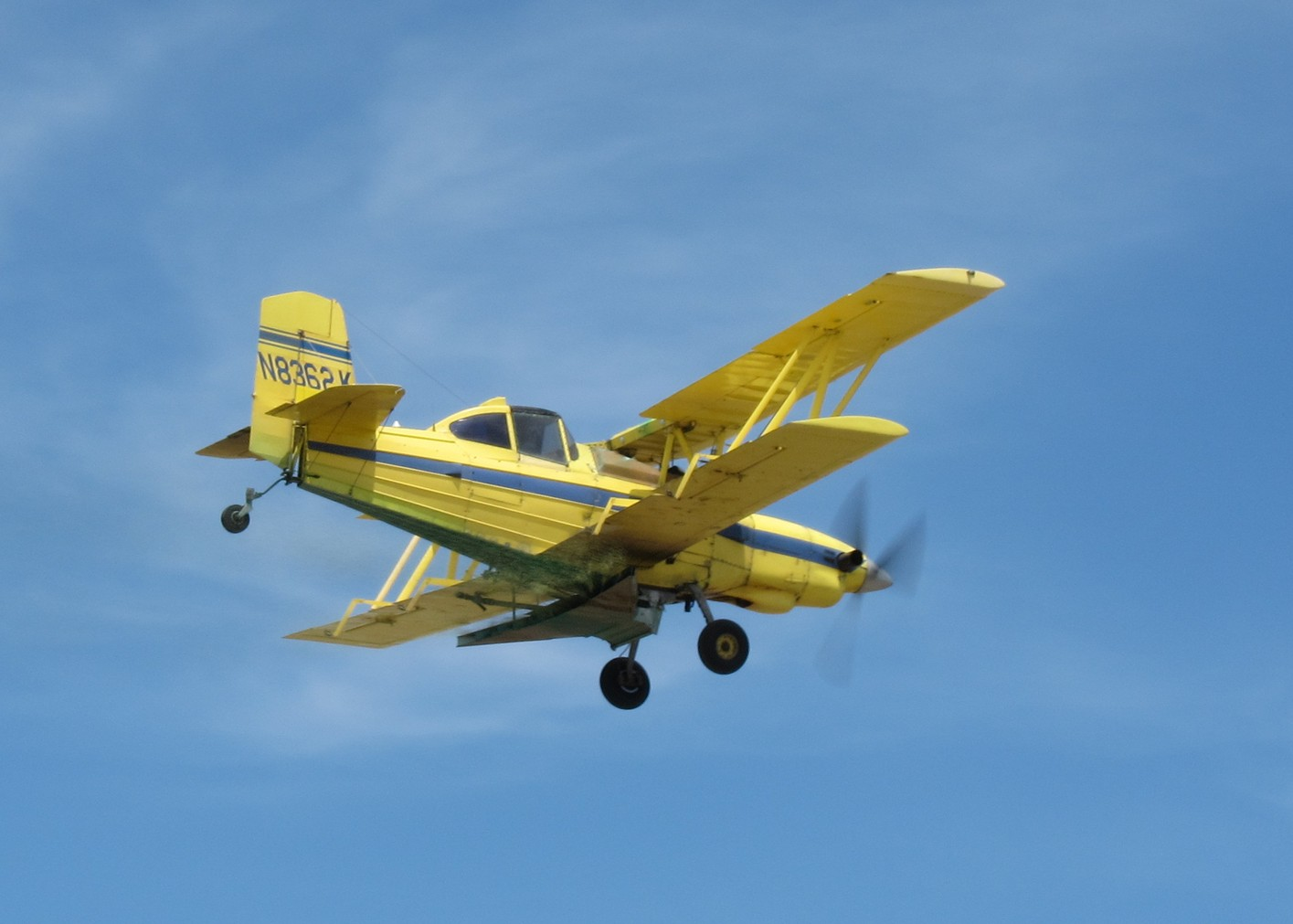
- Ag Cat G-164B

General information
- Type: Agricultural aircraft
- Manufacturer: Grumman

History
- Introduction date: 1957
- First flight: 27 May 1957

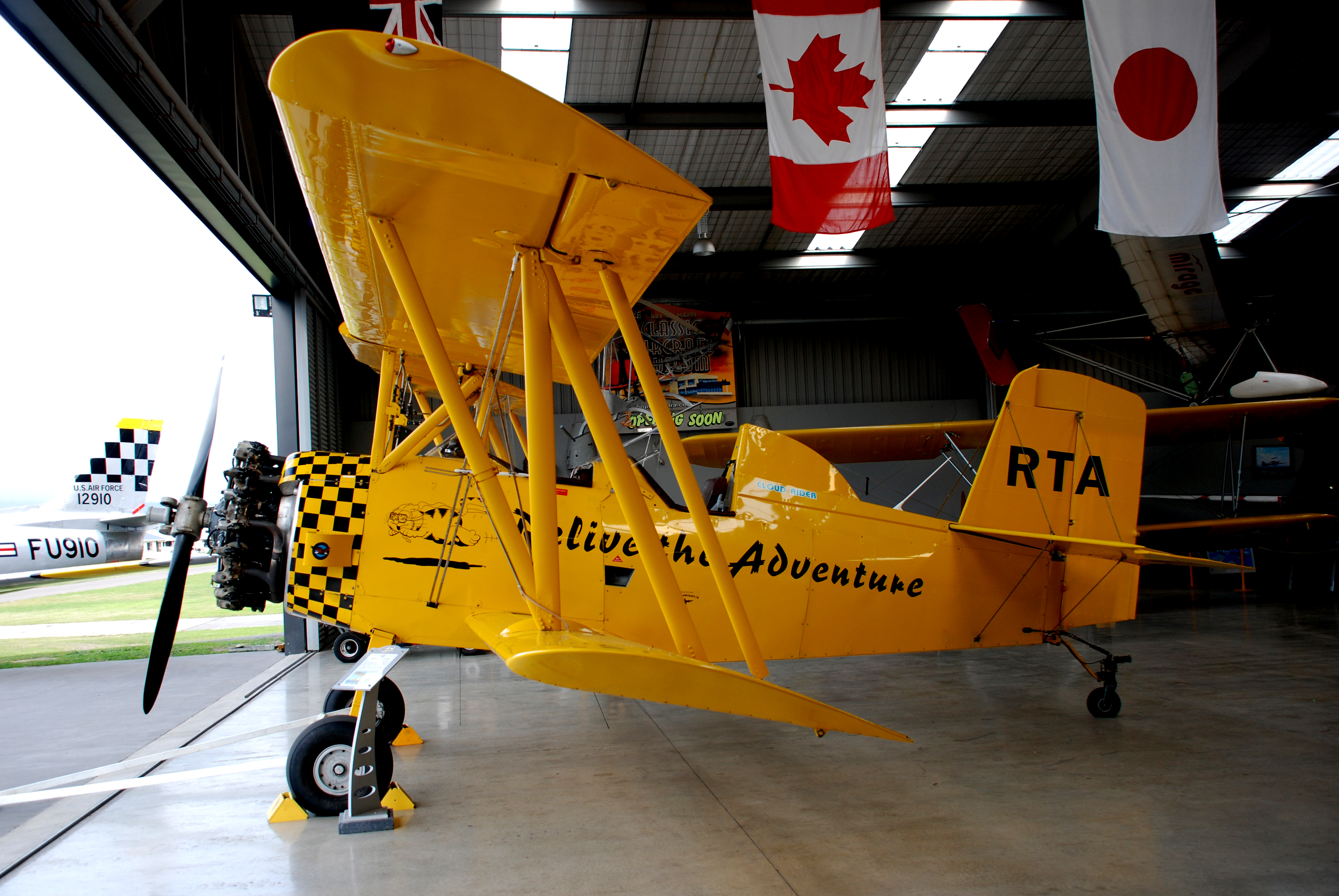
Schweizer Ag Cat A

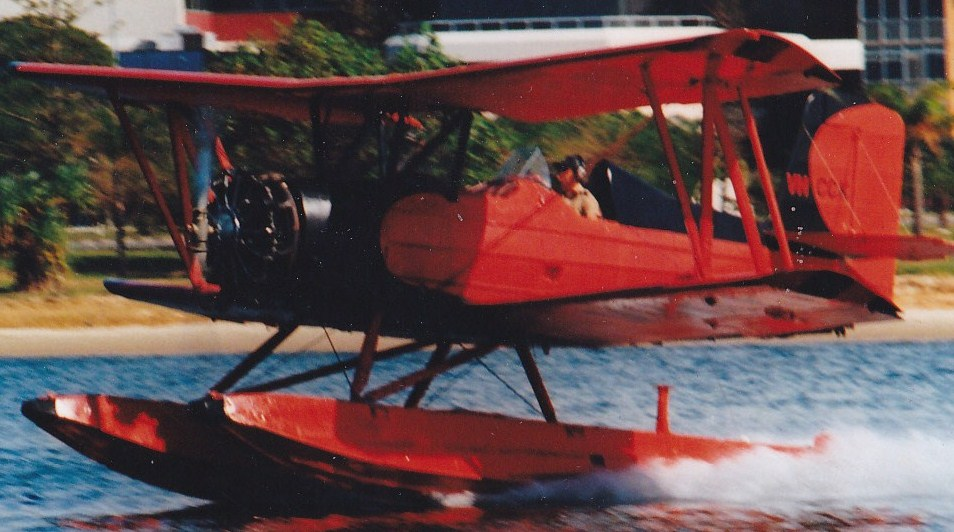
G164A on floats

The Grumman G-164 Ag Cat is a single-engined biplane agricultural aircraft, developed by Grumman in the 1950s.

== Development ==
In 1955, Grumman preliminary design engineers Joe Lippert and Arthur Koch proposed the design for a "purpose-built" crop-dusting airplane as a means of fulfilling a pressing need in the agricultural community, as well as the perceived need for Grumman to diversify its product lines. The initial market survey indicated that 100 to 200 of this type could be sold each year. Lippert's initial proposal was made under the project name "Farmair 1000".

The first G-164, which was built by Grumman (N74054), was equipped with a Continental W670 Series 6A-16 powerplant. The aircraft had its maiden flight on May 27, 1957, with Grumman test pilot Hank Kurt at the controls. This initial flight test consisted of three short familiarization hops with the take-off weight set at 3122 lb and the center of gravity at 31.2%. Flight tests 2 and 3, with test pilot Victor Eble, were accomplished on May 28, 1958, to evaluate its general flight characteristics. In total, 46 test flights were completed by the end of August 1958 with a general finding that this was a well-behaved aircraft with only minor refinements needed before production.

When the decision was made to authorize production, Leroy Grumman suggested marketing the aircraft under the name "The Grasshopper"; however, Dick Reade suggested "Ag Cat" following Grumman's naming tradition using the suffix "cat" in aircraft names (e.g., F4F Wildcat and F6F Hellcat). Mr. Grumman agreed and the Grumman G-164 became the "Ag Cat".

Large military orders prevented the production of the Ag Cat at Grumman's Bethpage facility. Grumman's board of directors chose to subcontract the entire program to the Schweizer Aircraft Corporation of Elmira, New York. Initial production was through a contract between Schweizer and Grumman. The first Schweizer-built Ag Cat, bearing registration number N10200, flew on October 17, 1958, under the control of Schweizer test pilot Clyde Cook. Full production began in January 1959, with Schweizer delivering 12 FAA-certified airplanes to Grumman by March 1959. The FAA granted type certification on January 20, 1959.

The ownership of the Ag Cat design has changed hands several times. Grumman transferred ownership to its commercial aircraft subsidiary, Grumman American, in 1973. A market feasibility study for a new agricultural aircraft (Ag Cat X) was completed by Grumman American in 1976. This study indicated that potential market demand existed for more than 100 aircraft each year. The study also showed that most of the concerns expressed by agricultural aircraft operators were addressed by the Ag Cat C model. The Grumman American subsidiary, which also owned the Grumman Gulfstream design series, was sold to American Jet Industries in 1978.

From initial production through 1981, Schweizer built 2,455 aircraft under contract. In 1981 Schweizer bought the rights to the design and continued production under the name Schweizer Ag Cat. Schweizer sold the design to Ag Cat Corp. of Malden, Missouri in 1995.

Five model G-164B aircraft were produced and registered before Ag Cat Corp. entered bankruptcy. One additional aircraft, a G-164BT500, is listed in the FAA registry as having been produced by Ag-Cat Corp., but no tail number was issued. This may have been an upgrade to an existing airframe.

In February 2001, the design was sold to Allied Ag Cat Productions Inc. of Walnut Ridge, Arkansas. Allied Ag Cat is not producing new aircraft, although a related company operates a large fleet of Ag-Cats.

Ethiopian Airlines has built 11 G-164B Ag-Cat Super B Turbines under licence as the Eshet in 1986, powered by Pratt & Whitney PT6A-34AG turbines.

The basic airframe incorporates many safety innovations, including a pressurized cockpit to keep pesticides out, air conditioning, and a fuselage structure that is designed to progressively collapse in the event of a collision. Lippert and Koch were recognized for their innovation in agricultural aircraft, being awarded the Puffer Award by Delta Air Lines in 1974.

Floats were approved for the aircraft in the early 1990s in Australia.

== Variants ==
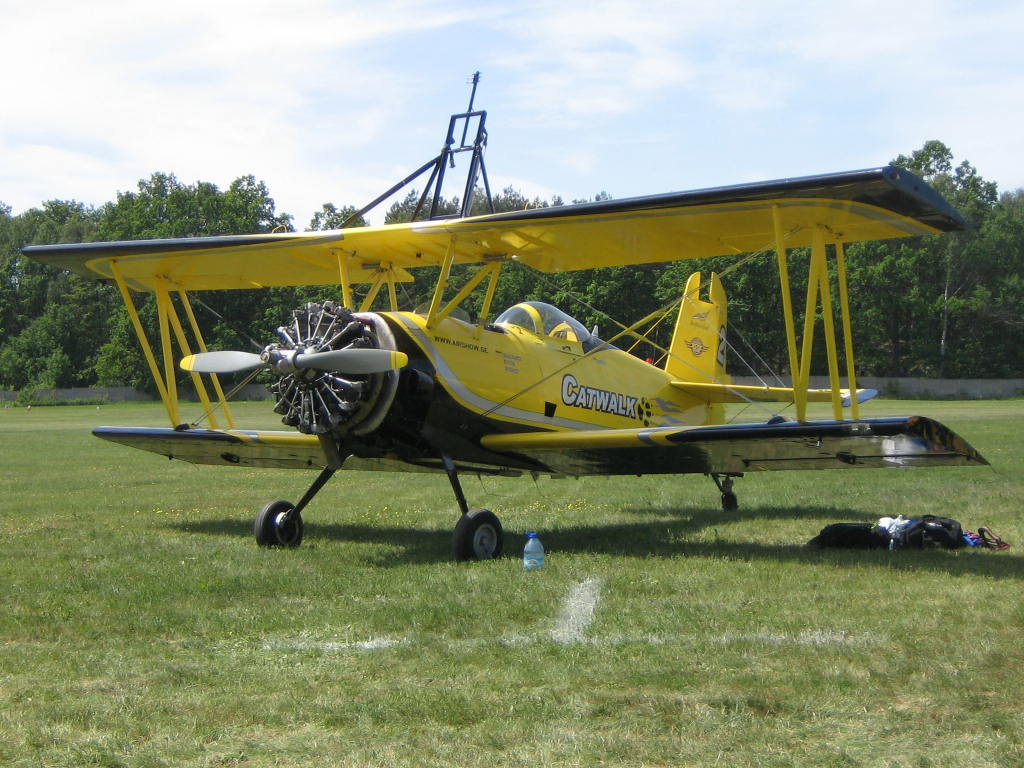
An Ag Cat set up for wingwalking

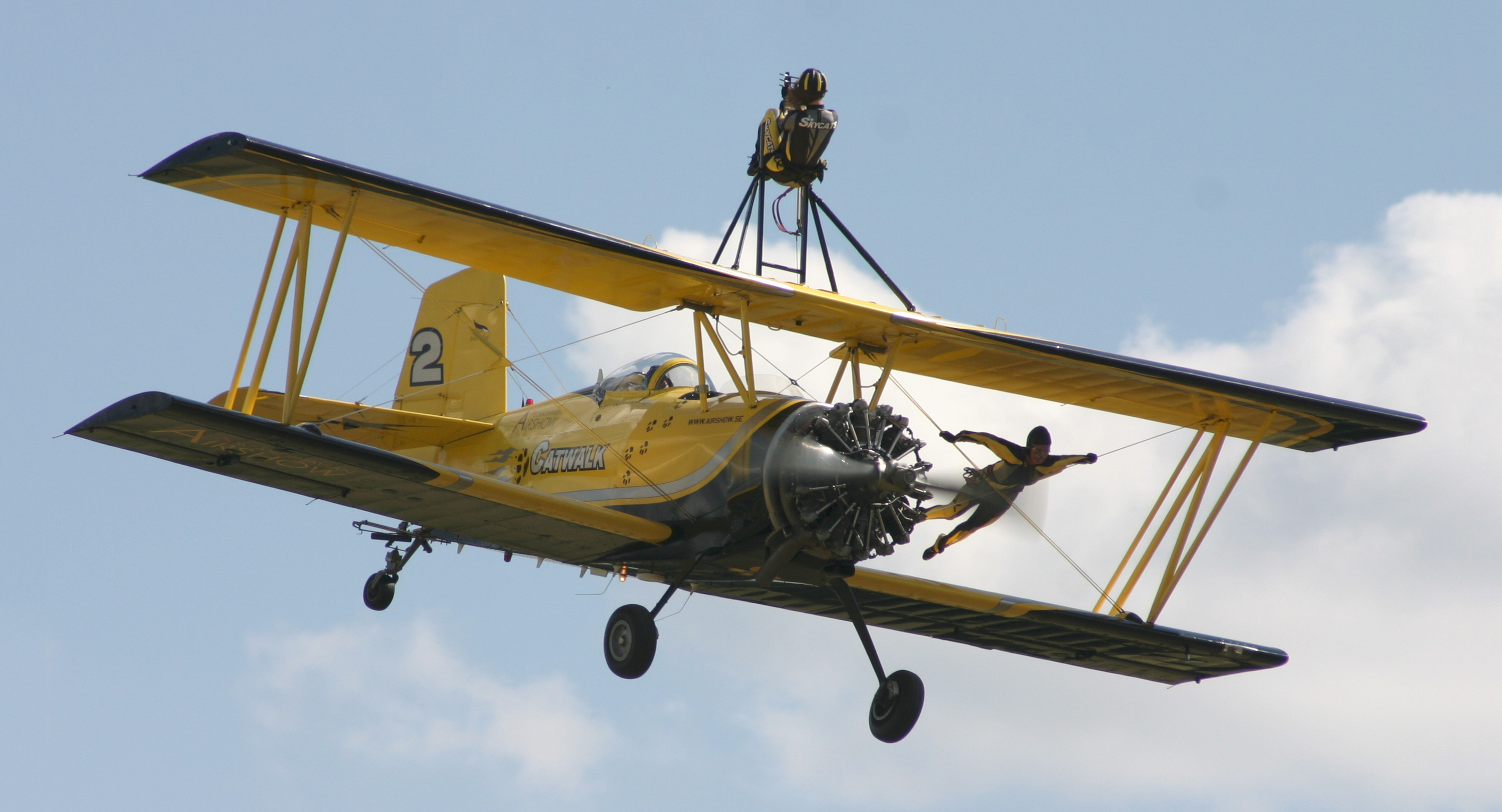
Grumman G-164A Ag Cat

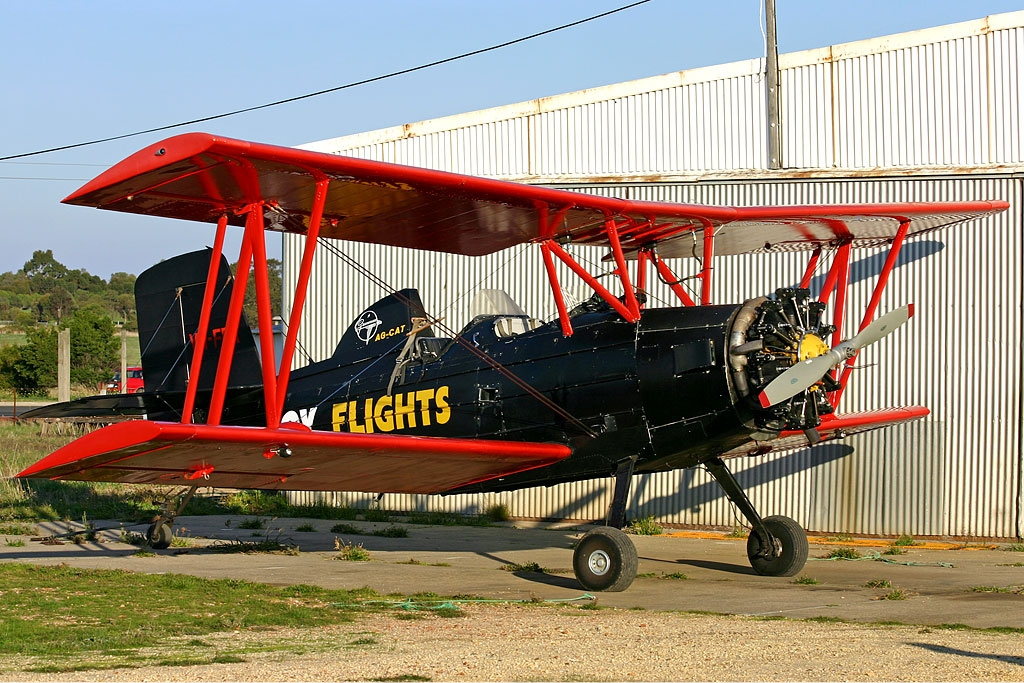
Australian-registered G-164 Ag-Cat configured for scenic flights

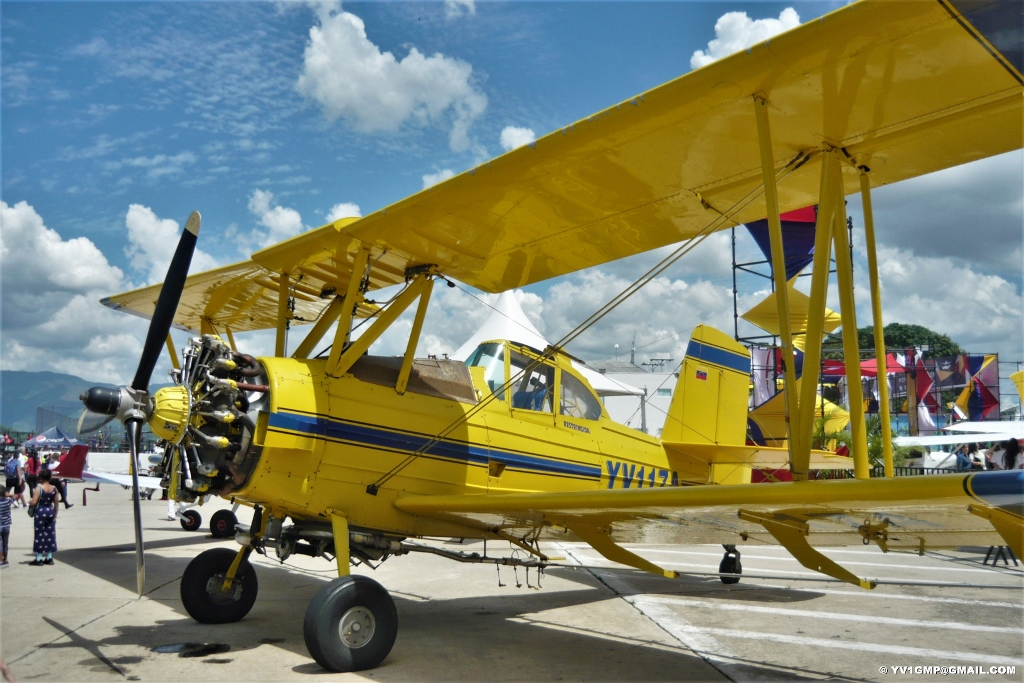
A Grumman G-164 Ag-Cat for agricultural use in Venezuela

Ag Cat
The basic model Ag Cat was certified with four different engines - the 220-225 hp (164-168 kW) Continental Motors radial engine, the 240 hp (179 kW) Gulf Coast W-670-240 radial engine, the 245 hp (183 kW) Jacobs L-4M or L-4MB radial engine, and the 275-300 hp (205-224 kW) Jacobs R-755 radial engine. A total of 400 of this model was produced.

Super Ag Cat A/450
The G-164A became the main model starting with serial number 401. This model featured a 450 hp (335 kW) Pratt & Whitney R-985 radial engine along with a higher gross weight, increased fuel capacity, larger diameter wheels, and improved brakes.

Super Ag Cat A/600
The A/600 incorporated the same improvements embodied in the A/400, but was powered by a Pratt & Whitney R-1340 radial engine of 600 hp (450 kW).

Super Ag Cat B/450
The B/450 improved on the "A" model by increasing the wingspan from 35 ft 11 in (10.95 m) to 42 ft 3 in (12.88 m). The fin and rudder were enlarged and the fuselage was also lengthened. The upper wing was raised on the "B" model by 8 in (20 cm) to reduce aerodynamic interference between the wings and improve cockpit visibility.

Super Ag Cat B/525
The B/525 incorporated the design improvements of the B/450, but was powered by a Continental /Page R-975 engine.

Super Ag Cat C/600
The C/600 first flew in 1976. It is similar to the model B/450, but has its fuselage further stretched to incorporate a 500 U.S. gallons (1,900 L; 420 imp gal) agricultural hopper. The model is powered by a 600 hp (450 kW) Pratt & Whitney R-1340 radial engine.

Turbo Ag Cat D/T
The "D" model is similar to the C/600, but replaced the radial piston engine with a Pratt & Whitney PT6A turboprop powerplant of 680 shp (507 kW).

Turbo Ag Cat D/ST
The D/ST model is identical to the Turbo Ag Cat D/T, but the engine was a Pratt & Whitney PT6A turboprop powerplant of 750 shp (559 kW).

Turbo Ag Cat D/SST
The D/SST model is identical to the Turbo Ag Cat D/T, but is powered by a Pratt & Whitney PT6A turboprop powerplant of 850 shp (634 kW).

Ag Cat B-Plus/600
Introduced in 1982 the B-Plus/600 is powered by a Pratt & Whitney R-1340 of 600 hp (450 kW). It has the larger hopper of the "C" model.

Ag Cat B-Plus/450
Also made available for the first time in 1982, the lower-powered B-Plus/450 is powered by a Pratt & Whitney R-985 of 450 hp (335 kW). This model was available only as a custom order.

Marsh G-164 C-T Turbo Cat
This aftermarket conversion was created by replacing the engine of the Super Ag Cat C/600 with a Garrett TPE331-1-101 turboprop, derated to 600 hp (450 kW).

Mid-Continent King Cat
This aftermarket conversion of the Super Ag Cat C/600 replaced the 600 hp (450 kW) Pratt & Whitney R-1340 engine with a Wright R-1820-202A radial engine that produces 1,200 hp (895 kW).

Twin Cat
An aftermarket conversion by Twin Cat Corporation, it relaces the R-1340 with two 360 hp (270 kW) Avco Lycoming TIO-540-J flat-six engines, close mounted to the sides of the forward fuselage. The prototype conversion flew in 1979, with conversion kits on sale from 1980.

Ethiopian Airlines Eshet
License-built Ag Cat Super B Turbine with local content from 1986.

== Aircraft on display ==
- National Air and Space Museum, Steven F. Udvar-Hazy Center - G-164A Super Ag Cat A/600

Mississippi Ag Museum, Jackson, MS - G-164 Ag Cat, serial X-1

== Specifications (G-164B Super B Turbine) ==
Data from Jane's Civil and Military Aircraft Upgrades 1994–95

General characteristics

- Crew: 1
- Capacity: 400 US gal (333 imp gal; 1,514 L) in forward hopper
- Length: 27 ft 7.25 in (8.41 m)
- Wingspan: 42 ft 4.5 in (12.9 m)
- Height: 12 ft 1 in (3.68 m)
- Wing area: 392.7 sq ft (36.48 m^{2})
- Empty weight: 3,150 lb (1,429 kg)
- Max takeoff weight: 7,020 lb (3,184 kg)
- Powerplant: 1 × Pratt & Whitney Canada PT6A-34AG turboprop, 750 shp (560 kW)
- Propellers: 3-bladed constant-speed propeller

Performance

- Maximum speed: 113 kn (130 mph, 209 km/h)
- Stall speed: 56 kn (64 mph, 104 km/h)
- Never exceed speed: 136 kn (157 mph, 252 km/h)
- Range: 172 nmi (198 mi, 319 km)

== See also ==
Aircraft of comparable role, configuration, and era

- Aero Boero 260AG
- Air Tractor AT-802
- Auster Agricola
- Ayres Thrush
- Cessna 188
- Emair MA-1
- Embraer EMB 202 Ipanema
- PAC Cresco
- PAC Fletcher
- Piper PA-25 Pawnee
- PZL-106 Kruk
- Zlin Z-37 Cmelak

Related lists

- List of civil aircraft
