= Emigh A-2 Trojan =

A-2 Trojan
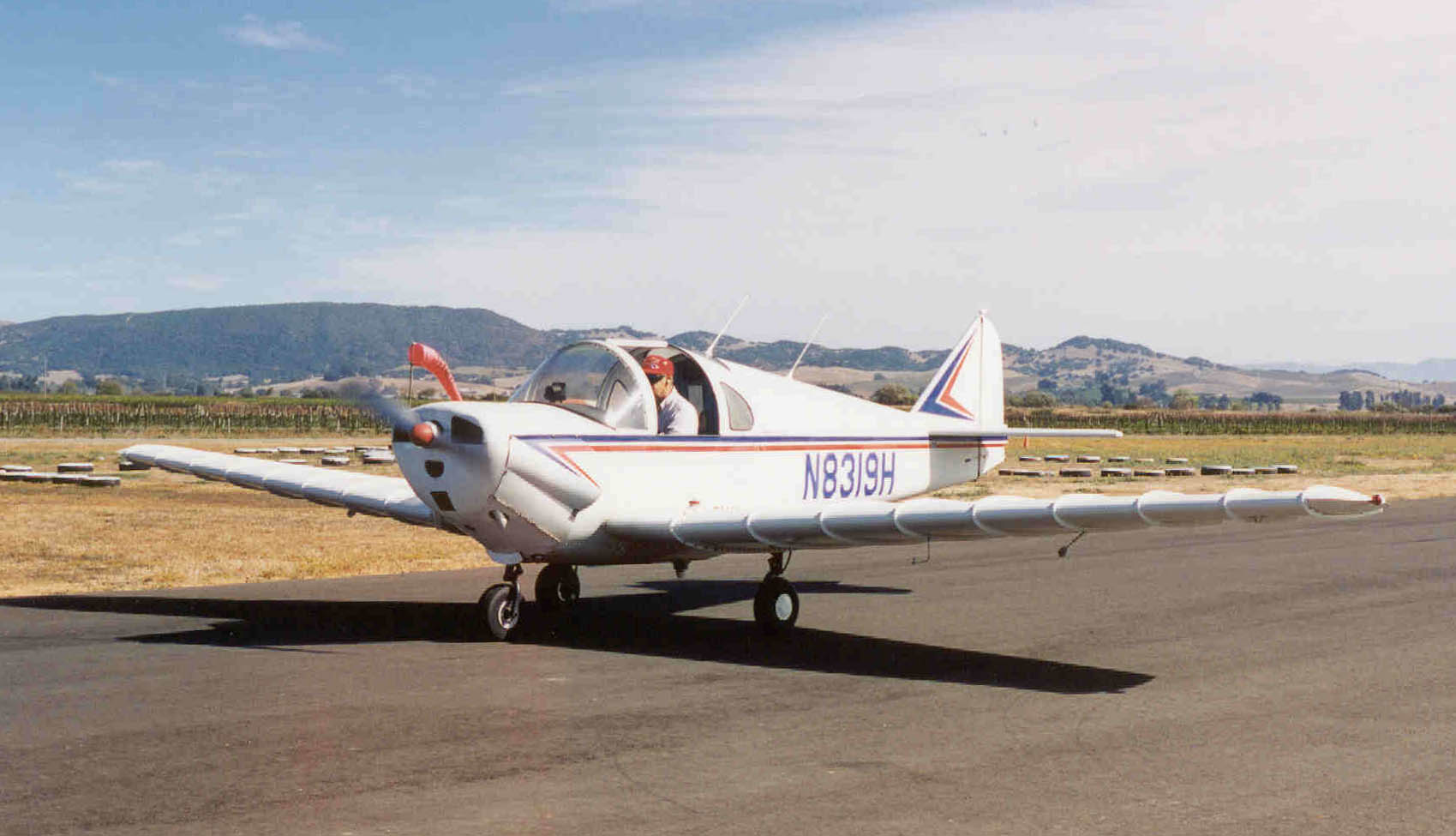

General information
- Type: Single-engined cabin monoplane
- National origin: United States
- Manufacturer: Emigh Trojan Aircraft Company
- Designer: Harold Emigh
- Status: examples still in service
- Primary user: private pilots
- Number built: 58

History
- Introduction date: 1947
- First flight: 20 December 1946

The Emigh A-2 Trojan was an American single-engined cabin cantilever monoplane designed and built by the Emigh Trojan Aircraft Company of Douglas, Arizona.

== Design and development ==
The A-2 had side-by-side seating in an enclosed cabin for a pilot and passenger. Of all metal construction it had a fixed tricycle landing gear and was powered by a Continental A90 flat-four piston engine. Many major components of the aircraft were designed to be interchangeable to simplify and lower manufacturing costs. The vertical and horizontal stabilizers were interchangeable as well as the rudder and elevators. A symmetrical section of the wing was interchangeable and the upper and lower fuselage skins were also identical. A total of 58 Trojans had been completed when production ceased in 1950.

== Specifications ==
Data from Orbis

General characteristics

- Crew: 2
- Length: 20 ft 5 in (6.22 m)
- Wingspan: 31 ft 7 in (9.63 m)
- Height: 6 ft 5 in (1.96 m)
- Wing area: 156.8 sq ft (14.57 m^{2})
- Powerplant: 1 × Continental C90 flat-four piston engine, 90 hp (67 kW)
- Propellers: 2-bladed

Performance

- Maximum speed: 130 mph (210 km/h, 110 kn)
- Cruise speed: 115 mph (185 km/h, 100 kn)
- Range: 500 mi (800 km, 430 nmi)
- Service ceiling: 13,000 ft (4,000 m)
