= Eberman 1930 Monoplane =

General information
- Type: Homebuilt aircraft
- National origin: United States of America
- Designer: Gus Eberman
- Number built: 1

History
- First flight: 1930

The Eberman Monoplane was an original Anzani-powered aircraft design by Gus Eberman built in 1930.

== Design and development ==
The Eberman Monoplane was built in Geneva, Illinois.

The Eberman Monoplane was a high-wing conventional landing gear-equipped aircraft with an open cockpit. The wings used fir spars with steel lift struts. The fuselage was all wood. The ailerons were controlled with a push-pull tube. The tail surfaces were welded steel tubing with aircraft fabric covering.

== Operational history ==
The aircraft flew for 105 minutes total before its first engine failure. A 1928 Anzani engine was installed as a replacement which subsequently failed after 12 hours.

== Specifications (Eberman 1930 Monoplane) ==
Data from Sport Aviation

General characteristics

- Capacity: one
- Length: 21 ft 5 in (6.53 m)
- Wingspan: 31 ft 4 in (9.55 m)
- Airfoil: Modified USA 27
- Empty weight: 850 lb (386 kg)
- Gross weight: 1,200 lb (544 kg)
- Fuel capacity: 35 US gallons (130 L; 29 imp gal)
- Powerplant: 1 × Anzani 6 cylinder, two row radial, 80 hp (60 kW)
- Propellers: 2-bladed Hartzell, 7 ft 4 in (2.24 m) diameter

Performance

- Maximum speed: 87 kn (100 mph, 160 km/h)
- Cruise speed: 74 kn (85 mph, 137 km/h)
- Stall speed: 43 kn (50 mph, 80 km/h)
- Rate of climb: 1,000 ft/min (5.1 m/s)
