= Morin M85 =

French homebuilt aircraft

M85
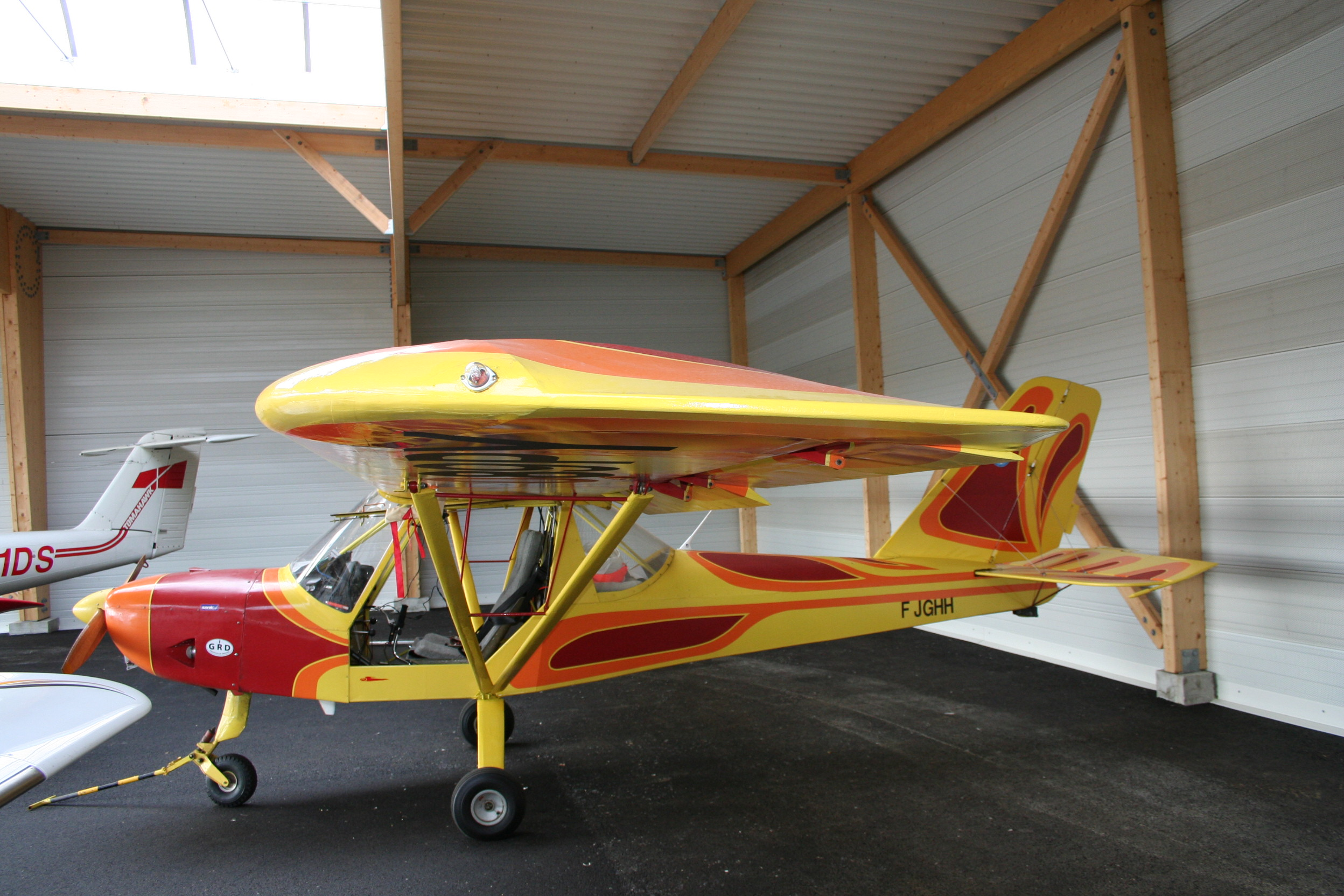

General information
- Type: Amateur-built aircraft
- National origin: France
- Manufacturer: Campavia
- Designer: Andre Morin
- Status: Plans available (2012)

The Etudes Andre Morin M85, or variously M 85 and M-85, is a French amateur-built aircraft that was designed by André Morin of Colombes. The aircraft is supplied in the form of plans for amateur construction.

== Design and development ==
The M85 features a strut-braced high-wing, a two-seats-in-side-by-side configuration enclosed cockpit accessed by doors, fixed tricycle landing gear and a single engine in tractor configuration.

The aircraft is made with a welded steel tubing fuselage. The wings can be constructed with either an aluminum sheet or wooden structure, with its flying surfaces covered in doped aircraft fabric in both cases. The wooden wings include leading edge slots. Its 9.86 m (32.3 ft) span wing has an area of 13.4 m^{2} (144 sq ft) and is supported by "V" struts and jury struts. The standard engine recommended is the 80 hp (60 kW) Rotax 912UL four-stroke powerplant. The World Directory of Leisure Aviation 2011-12 states that landing gear uses sprung aluminium suspension for all three wheels and that the nose wheel is freely castering and steering is accomplished with differential braking. Later models have sprung aluminium suspension for the main wheels and a rudder pedal-controlled steerable nose wheel.

== Specifications (M85) ==
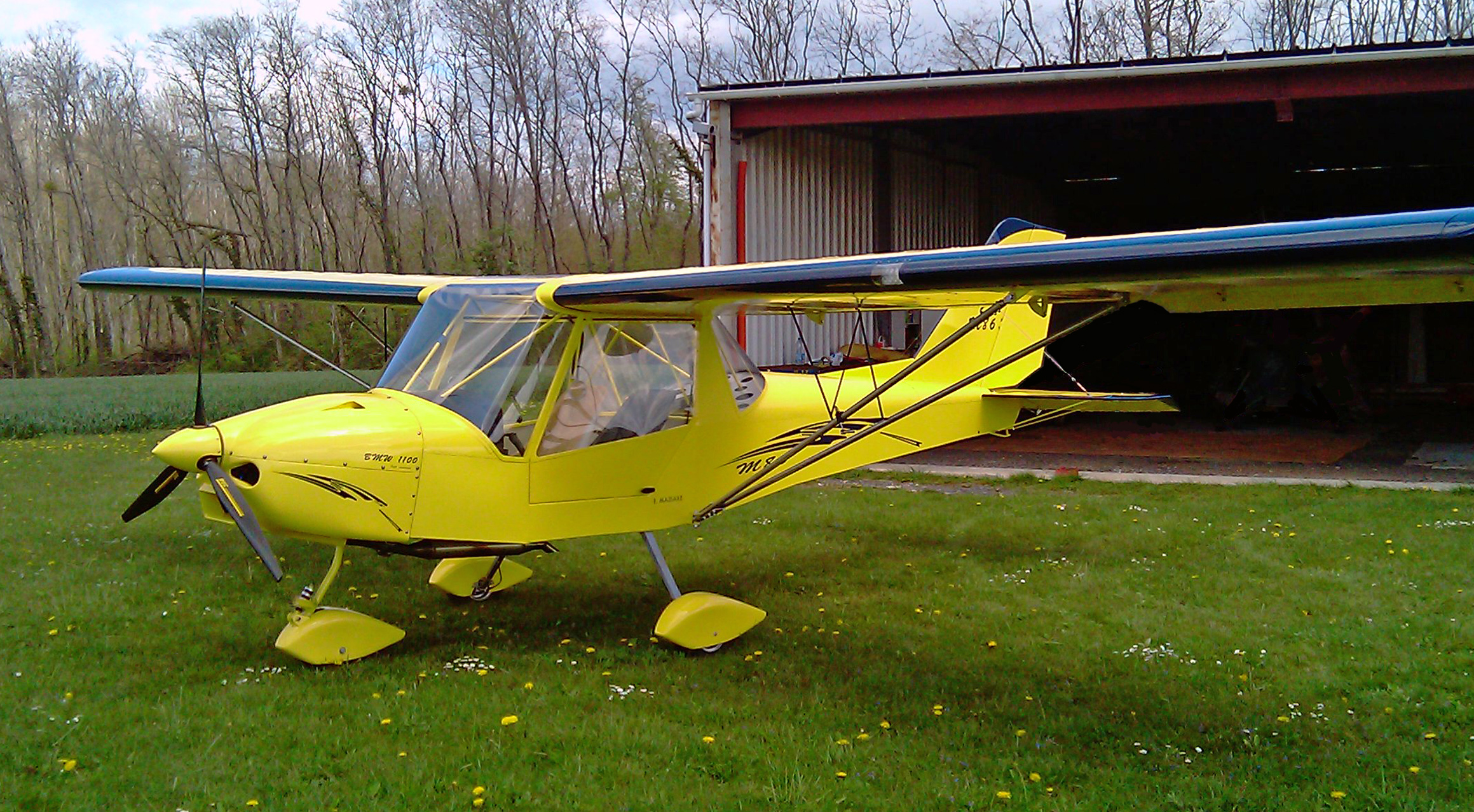
Morin M85

Data from Bayerl

General characteristics

- Crew: one
- Capacity: one passenger
- Wingspan: 9.86 m (32 ft 4 in)
- Wing area: 13.4 m^{2} (144 sq ft)
- Empty weight: 290 kg (639 lb)
- Gross weight: 450 kg (992 lb)
- Fuel capacity: 54 litres (12 imp gal; 14 US gal) in two 27 litres (5.9 imp gal; 7.1 US gal) wing tanks
- Powerplant: 1 × Rotax 912UL four cylinder, liquid and air-cooled, four stroke aircraft engine, 60 kW (80 hp)
- Propellers: 2-bladed wooden

Performance

- Maximum speed: 190 km/h (120 mph, 100 kn)
- Cruise speed: 155 km/h (96 mph, 84 kn)
- Stall speed: 60 km/h (37 mph, 32 kn)
- Rate of climb: 5 m/s (980 ft/min)
- Wing loading: 33.6 kg/m^{2} (6.9 lb/sq ft)
