= Everson aircraft and automobiles =

Everson aircraft were constructed by the brothers Arthur and Ernest Everson. They built three aircraft from the late 1920s. Their third, the Everson Evo III, was a long-range racing aircraft from New Zealand. It was the first and to date only twin-engined aircraft designed and built in New Zealand.

The Eversons also built a number of cars and a gyrocopter.

== Evo ==
The Evo was built in the late 1920s by Ernest and Arthur Everson of 9 Sentinel Road, Herne Bay. Evo was powered by a Henderson motor cycle engine. News of their construction was reported in 1928, with interest being shown in national newspapers. Ernest was described as the aircraft's designer. He was a draughtsman and had a keen interest in aircraft, having built a number of successful models. Neither he nor his brother had any flying experience.

Despite an attempt at flying the machine at the Mangere speedway on 10 July 1929 it never actually flew, but crashed attempting to take off. The Auckland Sun had reported a flight by the aircraft but this had turned out to be a hoax, possibly perpetrated by the brothers and their friends. The competing New Zealand Truth made much of its rival's error. The paper went on to say that the local Auckland Aero Club had refused the boys permission to use their field at Mangere because they considered the plane a hazard. The boys were aged 20 and 18 respectively at the time.

== Evo II ==
Undeterred by their first failure, Ernest and Arthur began construction of Evo II. After trying out a 23-horsepower motor-cycle engine (probably the Henderson from Evo I), they installed an 80 hp Hall-Scott engine. On 3 December 1930 they took the plane to Muriwai beach for its first and last flight. The flight was on 4 December 1930 but ended when, after lifting off to about 20 feet in the air, the wing broke and the plane crashed. The brothers survived the crash with only a few scratches and bruises. The plane, however, was a writeoff.

== Evo III ==
Against this background the brothers' decision to enter the 1934 MacRobertson Air Race between England and Australia seemed ambitious, but they came surprisingly close to achieving their goal with the Evo III.

The Evo III was a braced high-wing monoplane with a spatted tailwheel undercarriage, of conventional fabric-covered construction, powered by two Bristol Cherub Mk III engines, mounted beneath each wing. Built by the brothers and I Waugh in the Waikato, it first flew in May 1934 at Te Kauwhata and subsequently completed a successful test flight programme (albeit performance was hardly in the league of the De Havilland DH.88 Comet).

The wingspan was given as about the same as a de Havilland Puss Moth. Takeoff required a 250-yard runway. The aircraft's landing speed was given as about 28 mph. With auxiliary fuel tanks, the range was estimated as being 1,500 miles at a cruising speed of 100 mph. The plane was expected to reach a 10,000 foot altitude with relative ease.

The Evo III was then flown to Hobsonville to be assessed by the NZPAF, where it failed to obtain a certificate of airworthiness, due to the proximity of the propellers to the (open) cockpit and the poor view on approach for landing. Although both problems could be rectified by a rebuild, the brothers now had no hope of making the 20 October start of the race, and development of the Evo III ceased.

Two other New Zealand aircraft competed in the race, without placing. The Evo III was placed in storage at Te Kauwhata and was believed to have remained there until the 1960s. Its fate is unknown.

== Everson Cherub ==
Between 1935 and 1937 the Everson brothers designed and built a small two-seater motor car, named the Everson Cherub. It had a streamlined design, tubular steel chassis, independent suspension, rear mounted 2.5 horsepowered two-stroke single-cylinder engine, three-speed gearbox, and twin exhausts. The car was just over four feet high and weighted about 800 lbs. Its top speed was over 50 mph, with a cruising speed of 30-35 mph and fuel consumption of about 70 mpg. A least two more one-off models were made by the brothers.

== Fire ==
In 1938 Ernest was working for Anderton's Welding Works. An apprentice, John Holsted, was working with an acetylene torch under a car when it caught fire. Ernest went to his rescue, suffering severe burns as a result.

== Cliff Everson ==
In the 1960s Cliff Everson, Ernest's son, made several cars under the Everson name. There were four Everson 7s built between 1961 and 1964, which were based on the Lotus 7; eight Everson Cherubs were built between 1964 and 1969, which were based on the BMC Mini and looked similar to the Mini Moke; and between 1981 and 1984 the Everson Eagle, a car based on the Excalibur. The final car Cliff produced was the Everson EMW 6 between 1983 and 1989. It was based on the BMW M1 of the time. Only four were completed, with the 5th car being scrapped.

== Gyrocopter ==
In 1962 Ron and Ernest Everson built a gyrocopter. Its first flight was achieved when towed behind a car at Muriwai Beach and later when it had a motor fitted. The gyrocopter was never certified because of design issues and is now on display at MOTAT in Auckland.
