= Euler Hydro-triplane =

Hydro-triplane

General information
- Type: Amphibious triplane flying boat
- National origin: Germany
- Manufacturer: Euler-Werke
- Designer: August Euler
- Number built: 1

The Euler Hydro-triplane was an unusual pusher configuration amphibious triplane flying boat, built in Germany in 1913.

== Design and development ==
The April 1913 issue of the French magazine L'Aérophile contains a brief, unillustrated reference to an Euler triplane seaplane, powered by a 70 hp (52 kW) Gnome engine, a possible relative of the Hydro-triplane reported in detail by Flight early in the following year. Flight described it as "to the best of our knowledge, the first successful hydro-triplane constructed."

The Euler Hydro-triplane was a large aircraft, powered by a 100 hp (75 kW), nine cylinder Gnome Delta rotary engine, with an upper wingspan of 14 m (45 ft 11 in). All its wings were of essentially rectangular plan though with trailing edge cut-outs. The lower two wings were successively 2 m (6 ft 7 in) shorter. The upper pair formed a three bay structure with pairs of parallel interplane struts and upper wing overhangs supported by outward leaning parallel pairs. The central and lower wings formed a similar but two bay structure. There was strong stagger, with the interplane struts at about 30° to the wing normal. The Gnome engine was mounted, uncowled and in pusher configuration, just above the central wing. Because of the stagger the engine was shielded from spray by the lower wing. There were ailerons on both upper and lower wings.

The lower wings were mounted on the top of a flat bottomed, single-stepped hull with flat sides which tapered in profile toward the rear. The wings were further braced to the hull by a pair of struts reaching back from the nose to the centre wing leading edge. The nose also had raised decking protecting of the pilot, who sat in the front of the open cockpit with a passenger seat behind him.

The empennage of the Hydro-triplane was supported on a pair of lattice girders, parallel in plan and each constructed from a horizontal member fixed to the upper wing at the top of the innermost interplane struts and a member below it which sloped upward from the lower wing to meet the upper one at the tail. Three sloping cross braces completed each girder. The rectangular tailplane, fitted with elevators, was placed over the ends of the girders, its leading edge braced by a central, vertical strut to the hull which also supported the rudder post out beyond the hull on upper and lower sloping struts. The trapezoidal rudder extended a little above the horizontal tail, which had a deep V-shaped cut-out to accommodate its movement.

The Euler Hydro-triplane was a true amphibian with twin mainwheels on upper and lower pairs of struts attached to the hull, the former rubber sprung. Ground clearance was minimal. The wheels could be raised by the pilot in flight on a land to water flight and lowered at the end of the reverse journey.

== Operational history ==
Flight's description of the Euler Hydro-triplane as "successful" implies that it had flown by January 1914. It was not mentioned again in that magazine until October 1914, after the outbreak of World War I, when it was amongst those 'Aircraft "made in Germany" which may be used against the Allies'; there is no suggestion that it was ever armed.

== Specifications ==
Data from Flight 24 January 1914 p.95

General characteristics

- Crew: Two
- Length: 7.0 m (23 ft) hull length, tail extended about 2 m (7 ft) further aft
- Upper wingspan: 14 m (45 ft 11 in)
- Mid wingspan: 10 m (32 ft 10 in)
- Lower wingspan: 8 m (26 ft 3 in)
- Powerplant: 1 × Gnome Delta 9-cylinder rotary, 75 kW (100 hp)
- Propellers: 2-bladed
