= Eurofly Fox =

Italian ultralight aircraft

Fox
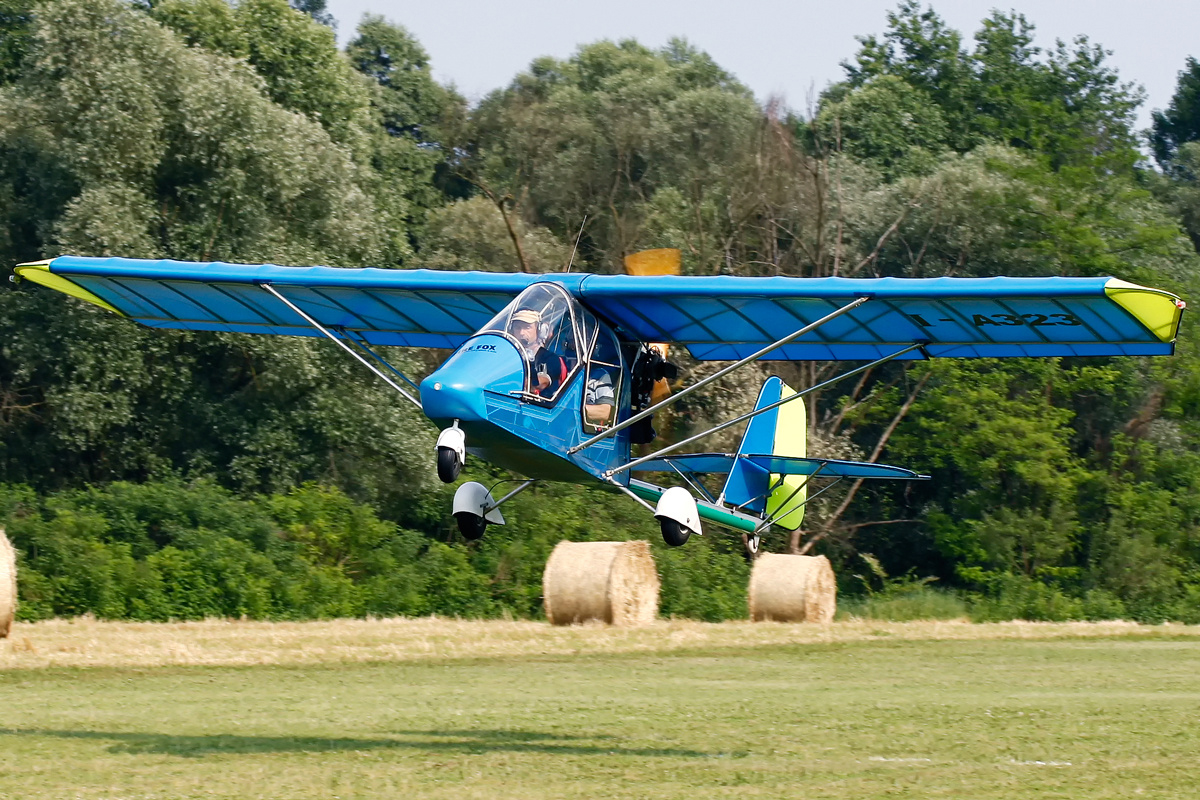

General information
- Type: Ultralight aircraft
- National origin: Italy
- Manufacturer: Eurofly srl
- Status: Production completed

The Eurofly Fox is an Italian ultralight aircraft that was designed and produced by Eurofly srl of Galliera Veneta. When it was available the aircraft was supplied as a complete ready-to-fly-aircraft or as a kit for amateur construction.

== Design and development ==
The aircraft was designed to comply with the Fédération Aéronautique Internationale microlight category, including the category's maximum gross weight of 450 kg (992 lb). The Fox features a strut-braced parasol wing, a two-seats-in-side-by-side configuration open cockpit with a windshield, fixed tricycle landing gear with wheel pants and a single engine in pusher configuration.

The aircraft is made from mixed steel and aluminum tubing, with its flying surfaces covered in Dacron sailcloth envelopes. Its 9.60 m (31.5 ft) span wing has no flaps and has a wing area of 16.09 m^{2} (173.2 sq ft). Each wing is supported by two parallel struts with jury struts. The standard engine used is the 50 hp (37 kW) Rotax 503 two-stroke powerplant.

== Variants ==
Basic Fox
Stripped down version with minimal options, designed as a trainer.

== Specifications (Basic Fox) ==
Data from AeroCrafter

General characteristics

- Crew: one
- Capacity: one passenger
- Length: 6.20 m (20.33 ft)
- Wingspan: 9.60 m (31.48 ft)
- Wing area: 16.09 m^{2} (173.2 sq ft)
- Empty weight: 190 kg (418 lb)
- Gross weight: 450 kg (992 lb)
- Powerplant: 1 × Rotax 503 twin cylinder, air-cooled, two stroke aircraft engine, 37 kW (50 hp)
- Propellers: 2-bladed composite

Performance

- Maximum speed: 121 km/h (75 mph, 65 kn)
- Cruise speed: 80 km/h (50 mph, 43 kn)
- Stall speed: 40 km/h (25 mph, 22 kn)
- Rate of climb: 5.0 m/s (980 ft/min)
