= Gillespie Aeroplane =

1900s American airplane

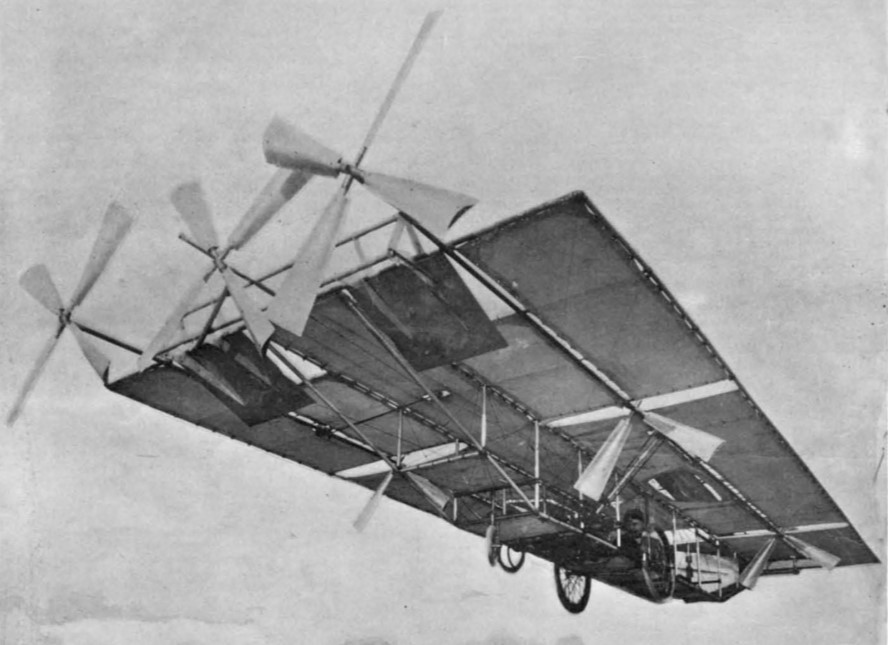
- A staged photograph of the Gillespie Aeroplane, showing it as though it was in flight

General information
- Type: Experimental aircraft
- National origin: USA
- Manufacturer: G. Curtis Gillespie
- Number built: 1

History
- Introduction date: 1905

The Gillespie Aeroplane was a 1900s monoplane built by the American architect G. Curtiss Gillespie and was notable for its very low aspect ratio wing.

== Design and development ==
The Aeroplane was designed to address issues with stability and equilibrium that Gillespie believed previous flying machine designs had suffered from. His studies led him to design an aircraft with a very narrow span and a long chord, with control surfaces embedded into the wing's planform, so that the pilot could maximize the longitudinal control, and minimize the lateral instability or "upset" of the craft.

Pitch control was to be achieved by two pairs of elevators, one front and one rear, both located within the planform of the wing. Lateral control was attended to by two movable surfaces, integrated into the wing, and located halfway along the chord. Directional control was through a flat-plate rudder located to the rear and underneath the wing.

The wing was constructed from a rectangular framework made of aluminum tubing, reinforced with piano wire. It was covered with duck canvas. The airfoil was a flat plate with no incidence and no camber.

The engine and pilot were located in a rectangular framework located underneath the wing. The engine was an air-cooled flat-six gasoline engine, said to develop 20 hp (15 kW). It powered the seven propellers using chain drives. Two sets of three propellers, located inboard of the wing tips, each shared a long drive shaft. The seventh propeller was located ahead of the wing's leading edge, close to two other propellers. Each propeller had four blades, and were made of aluminum.

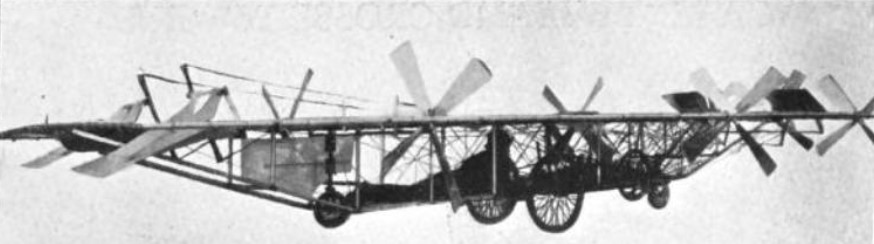
Rear quarter view of the Gillespie Aeroplane

The pilot lay in a prone position, just behind the engine. The monoplane featured a tricycle undercarriage, with a tailwheel positioned underneath the rudder and which would come into play, should the craft pitch up.

There were no reports of the airplane's tests, nor of any flights that may have been made.

In late 1906, the Aeroplane was displayed at the second annual exhibition of the Aero Club of America. Such was the rapid progress of aviation of the era, that a contemporary report referred to the aircraft as "an historical exhibit".

== Specifications ==
Data from Scientific American

General characteristics

- Crew: 1
- Length: 24 ft (7.3 m)
- Wingspan: 10 ft (3.0 m)
- Height: 3 ft (0.91 m) with propeller horiztonal
- Wing area: 240 sq ft (22 m^{2})
- Aspect ratio: 0.417
- Airfoil: flat plate
- Gross weight: 450 lb (204 kg)
- Powerplant: 1 × Gillespie air-cooled six cylinder gasoline engine, 20 hp (15 kW) maximum
- Propellers: 7 x 4-bladed fixed-pitch propellers, 4 ft (1.2 m) diameter

Performance

- Wing loading: 1.875 lb/sq ft (9.15 kg/m^{2}) at maximum take-off weight

== See also ==
Aircraft of comparable role, configuration, and era

- Epps 1909 Monoplane
