= Ben T. Epps =

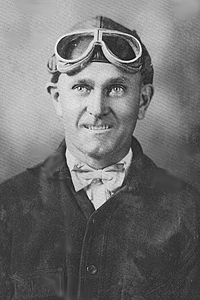
- Epps c. 1910s
- Born: February 20, 1888; Oconee County, Georgia, U.S.
- Died: October 16, 1937 (aged 49); Georgia, U.S.
- Occupations: Aviator, Aircraft Designer
- Spouse: Omie Williams

Ben T. Epps (February 20, 1888 –- October 16, 1937), known as "Georgia's First Aviator" was an American aviation pioneer. In 1907, he built a monoplane of his own design, now known as the Epps 1909 Monoplane. This was followed by other original monoplane and biplane designs in 1909, 1910, 1911-12, 1916, 1924 and 1930. He died of injuries as a result of an airplane crash. Athens-Ben Epps Airport is named in his honor. In 1989 he was inducted into the inaugural class of the Georgia Aviation Hall of Fame.

== Aircraft designs ==
Between 1907 and 1930, Epps designed and built seven aircraft:

- Epps 1909 Monoplane
- Epps 1909 Monoplane
- Epps 1910 Monoplane
- Epps 1912 Monoplane
- Epps 1916 Biplane
- Epps 1924 Monoplane
- Epps 1930 Biplane
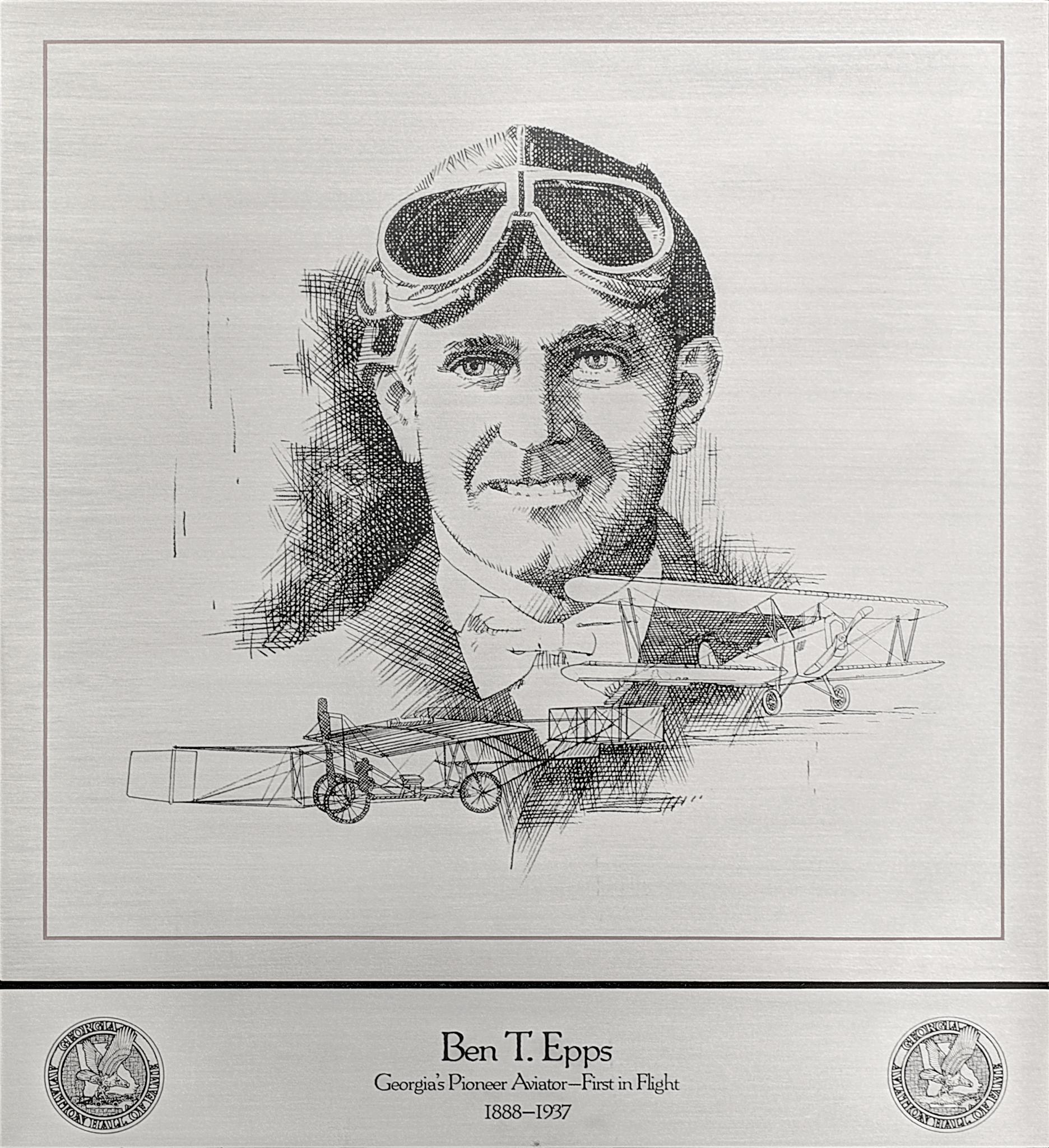
Plaque of Epps at the Georgia Aviation Hall of Fame

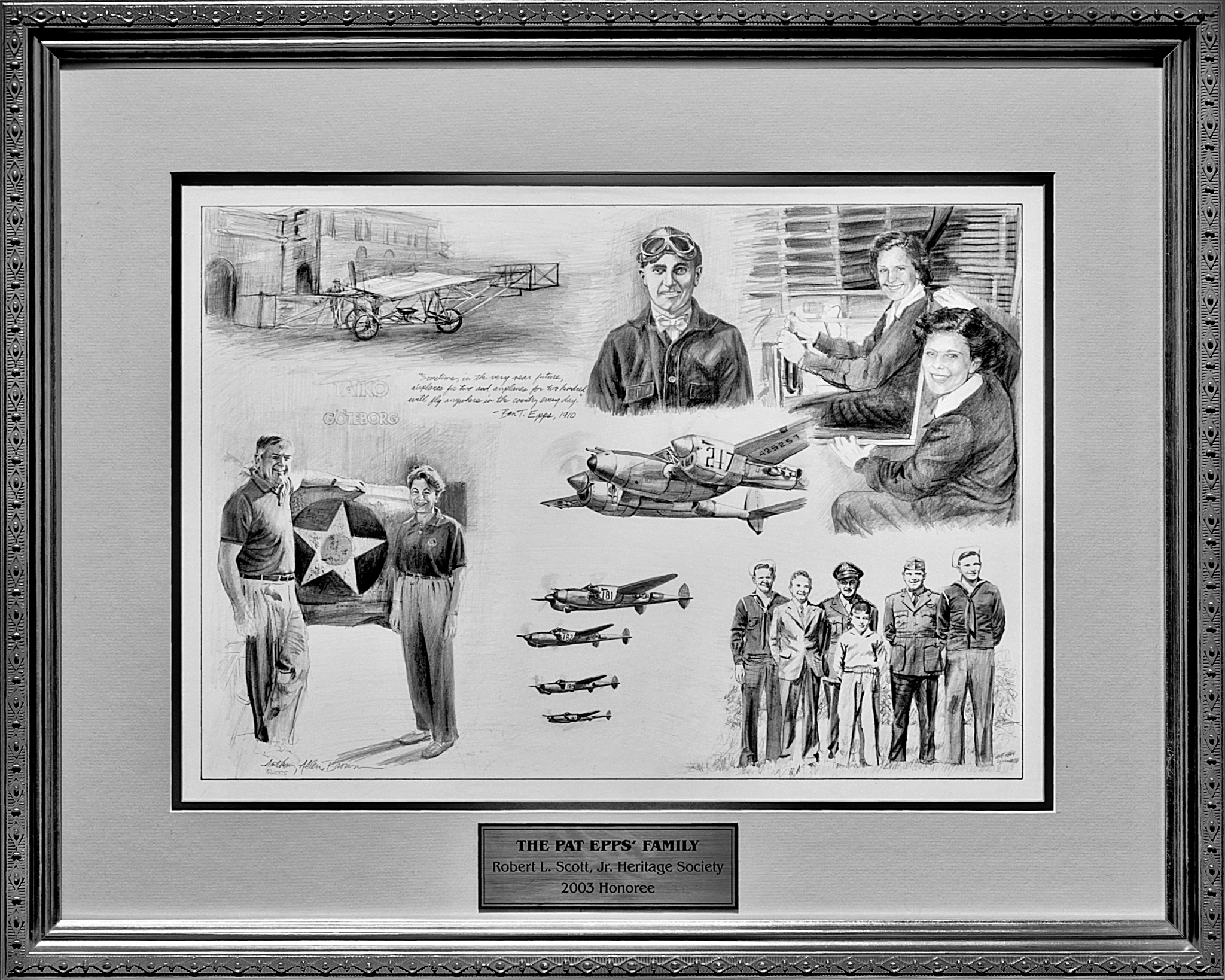
Painting of the Epps family at the Museum of Aviation
