= Tony Whitehead =

Tony Whitehead may refer to:

- Tony Whitehead, UK HIV activist and former chair of the Terrence Higgins Trust
- Tony L. Whitehead, retired United States Air Force officer
