= Tony L. Whitehead =

US Air Force senior noncommissioned officer

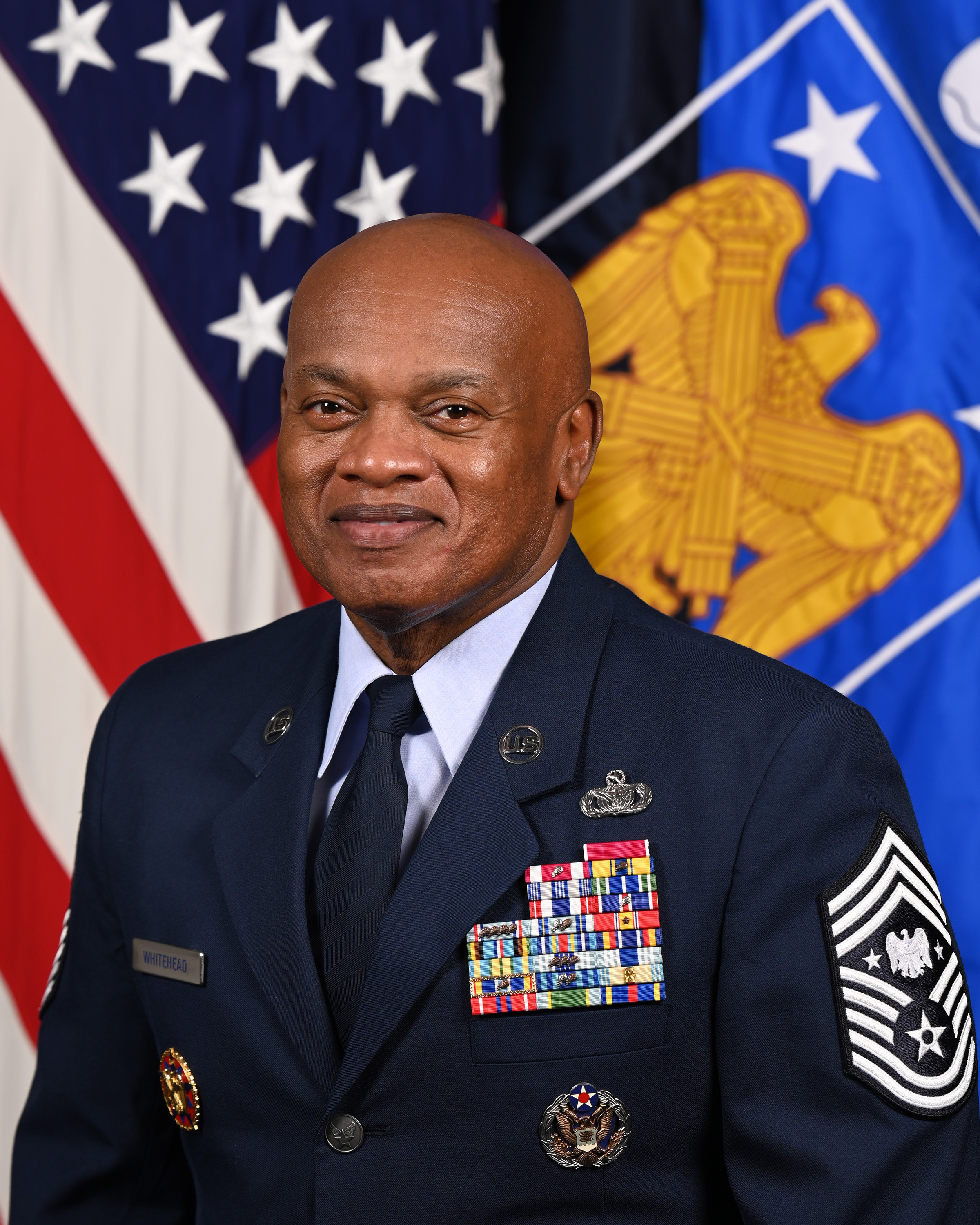
- Whitehead in 2023
- Military career
- Allegiance: United States
- Branch: United States Air Force
- Service years: 1982–2024
- Rank: Senior Enlisted Advisor to the Chief of the National Guard Bureau
- Conflicts: Operation Southern Watch; Operation Enduring Freedom
- Awards: Defense Distinguished Service Medal; Legion of Merit
- Tony L. Whitehead's voice Whitehead's opening remarks at a DOD press conference on National Guard priorities Recorded January 24, 2023

Tony L. Whitehead is a retired senior noncommissioned officer in the United States Air Force and the sixth Senior Enlisted Advisor to the Chief of the National Guard Bureau. He succeeded Army CSM Christopher S. Kepner on 25 August 2020, and is the first senior enlisted advisor of the NGB to wear a unique rank insignia. At the time of his selection, he was the Command Chief Master Sergeant, CONR-1 AF (AFNORTH), Tyndall AFB, Florida.

== Military career ==
SEA Tony L. Whitehead is the Senior Enlisted Advisor to the Chief of the National Guard Bureau, Pentagon, Washington D.C. He serves as the Chief's principal military advisor on all enlisted matters affecting training, utilization, health of the force, and enlisted professional development. As the highest enlisted level of leadership, he provides direction for the enlisted force and represents their interests.

Chief Whitehead entered the Air Force in December 1982 and served as Security Specialist. His background encompasses a myriad of positions and assignments in the Security Specialist and Security Forces career field. He has participated in Operations Southern Watch and Enduring Freedom. During these operations, Chief Whitehead performed duties as First Sergeant, Security Forces Manager, and Senior Enlisted Advisor to the 10th ASG Provost Marshal. He served 10 years on active duty. After a small break in service he joined the Florida Air National Guard. Chief Whitehead was activated as the ARC First Sergeant for the 125 Fighter Wing on 11 September 2001. In September 2003, he was hired as the Operations Superintendent for the 125th Security Forces Squadron. In April 2010, Chief Whitehead was selected as the Air National Guard Security Forces Career Field Manager, representing over 7300 ANG Defenders, Air National Guard Readiness Center, Joint Base Andrews. He also served as the Superintendent to the Director, Installations and Mission Support for the Air National Guard on all enlisted matters.

== Education ==
- 1982 Basic Military Training, Lackland Air Force Base, Texas
- 1983 USAF Security Police Academy, Lackland AFB, Texas
- 1983 Air Base Ground Defense, Camp Bullis, Texas
- 1986 Noncommissioned Officer Preparatory Course, Kadena Air Base, Japan
- 1996 Noncommissioned Officer Academy (correspondence)
- 1999 Diversity Facilitator, Denver, Colorado
- 2000 USAF First Sergeant Academy, Maxwell, AFB, Ala.
- 2001 Senior Noncommissioned Officer Academy, Maxwell, AFB, Ala.
- 2007 USAF Contemporary Base Issues, Jacksonville ANGB, Fla.
- 2008 Chief Master Sergeant Executive Course, Joint Base Andrews, Md.
- 2009 Chief Master Sergeant Leadership Course, Maxwell AFB, Ala.
- 2011 Senior Enlisted Joint PME (Legacy), Joint Forces Staff College, Norfolk, Va.
- 2012 Strategic Mindset Seminar, Stimson & Associates, Inc., Arlington, Va.
- 2013 ANG Command Chief Orientation Course, Joint Base San Antonio, Texas
- 2013 Associate Degree, Criminal Justice, Community College of the Air Force
- 2014 AFSO21 Executive Leadership Seminar, University of Tennessee
- 2015 KEYSTONE Joint Command Senior Enlisted Leader Course, National Defense University, Ft. McNair, Washington, D.C.
- 2016 Enterprise Perspective Seminar (Middle East, Eastern Europe & China), Allan L. Freed & Associates, Washington, D.C.
- 2017 Defense Support of Civil Authorities, Joint Knowledge Online, Suffolk, Va., by correspondence
- 2019 USAF Senior Enlisted Legal Orientation Course, Maxwell AFB. Ala.
- 2020 Senior Enlisted Joint PME II Course, National Defense University by correspondence
- 2020 Bachelor of Science, Criminal Justice Administration, Columbia Southern University, Orange Beach, Ala.

== Assignments ==
1. 1983–December 1984, Missile Security Response Team, 44th Missile Security Squadron, Ellsworth AFB, S.D.
2. 1985–December 1989, Staff NCO, Security Ops, 18th Security Police Squadron, Kadena AB, Okinawa
3. 1990–January 1991, NCOIC, Plans / Programs, 51st SPS, Osan AB, South Korea
4. 1991–February 1992, Contraband Investigations, 24th SPS, Howard AFB, Panama
5. 1992–August 1992, Security Police Flight Chief, 347th SPS, Moody AFB, Ga.
6. 1994–May 2000, Security Response Team, Enlisted Training Manager, NCOIC, CATM, 125th SFS, Jacksonville, Fla.
7. 2000–July 2003, First Sergeant, 125th Mission Support Group, Jacksonville, Fla.
8. 2003–January 2007, Operations Superintendent, 125th SFS, Jacksonville, Fla.
9. 2007–May 2010, Security Forces Manager, 125th SFS, Jacksonville, Fla.
10. 2010–May 2013, ANG Security Forces Career Field Manager, ANGRC, Joint Base Andrews, Md.
11. 2013–November 2015, Command Chief, Air National Guard Readiness Center, Joint Base Andrews, Md.
12. 2015–October 2018, Command Chief, 127th Wing, Selfridge ANGB, Mich.
13. 2018– September 2019, State Command Chief, JFHQ, Puerto Rico Air National Guard, Ft. Buchanan, PR
14. 2019–August 2020, Command Chief Master Sergeant, CONR-1 AF (AFNORTH), Tyndall AFB, FL
15. 2020–November 2024, Senior Enlisted Advisor to the Chief of the National Guard Bureau, Pentagon, Washington D.C.

== Awards and decorations ==
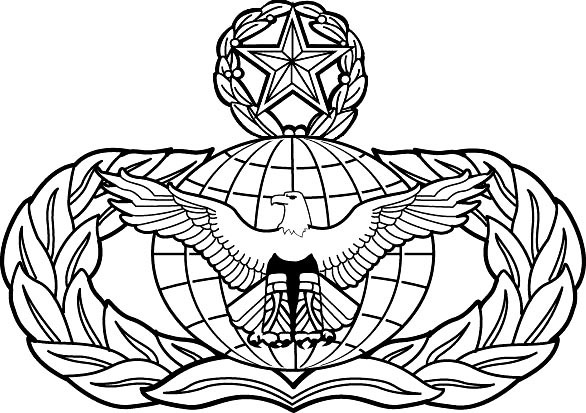
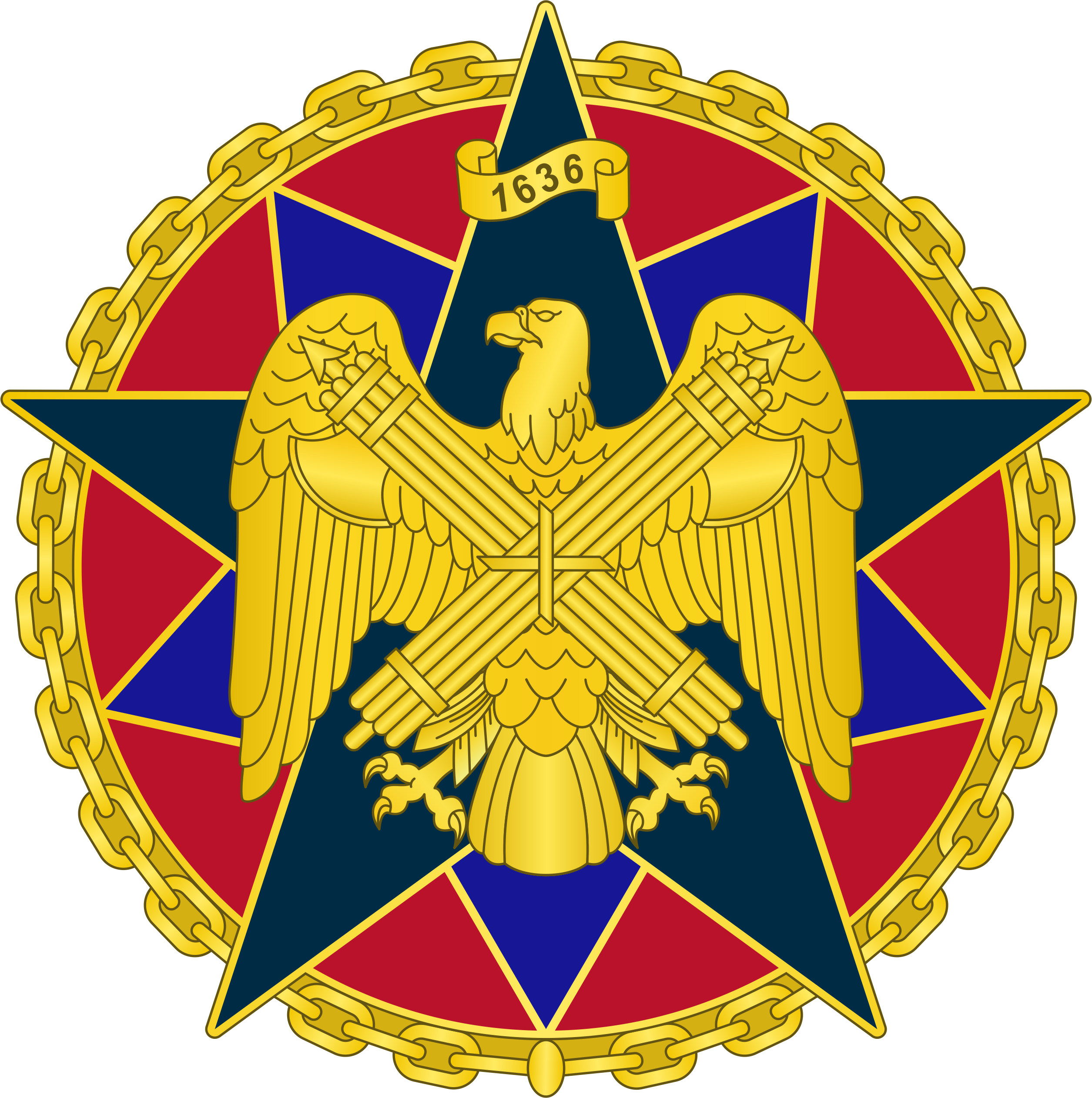
| Air Force Master Force Protection Badge |
| Headquarters Air Force Badge |
| National Guard Bureau Organizational Badge |

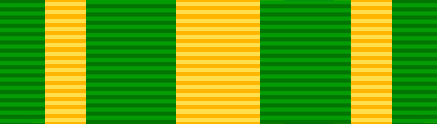
| Defense Distinguished Service Medal |
| Legion of Merit |
| Meritorious Service Medal with one silver oak leaf cluster |
| Air Force Commendation Medal with oak leaf cluster |
| Air Force Achievement Medal |
| Army Achievement Medal |
| Air Force Meritorious Unit Award |
| Air Force Outstanding Unit Award with silver oak leaf cluster |
| Air Force Good Conduct Medal with silver oak leaf cluster |
| Air Force Reserve Good Conduct Medal with one silver and one bronze oak leaf clusters |
| National Defense Service Medal with one bronze service star |
| Armed Forces Expeditionary Medal |
| Global War on Terrorism Expeditionary Medal |
| Global War on Terrorism Service Medal |
| Military Outstanding Volunteer Service Medal |
| Air Force Overseas Short Tour Service Ribbon with three oak leaf clusters |
| Air Force Overseas Long Tour Service Ribbon |
| Air Force Expeditionary Service Ribbon with gold frame and oak leaf cluster |
| Air Force Longevity Service Award with one silver and one bronze oak leaf clusters |
| Armed Forces Reserve Medal with gold hourglass device |
| Non-Commissioned Officer Professional Development Ribbon |
| Small Arms Expert Marksmanship Ribbon |
| Air Force Training Ribbon |
| Florida Commendation Medal |

== Other achievements ==
- 1986 Distinguished Graduate Award, Noncommissioned Officer Preparatory Course, Kadena AB, Okinawa
- 2000 Eric E. Williams Commandant's Award, USAF First Sergeant Academy, Maxwell AFB, Ala.
- 2002 125th Fighter Wing First Sergeant of the Year, Jacksonville ANGB, Fla.
- 2002 Florida Air National Guard First Sergeant of the Year
- 2008 NAACP Roy Wilkins Renown Service Award, Military Equal Opportunity Policies and Programs
- 2016 Facilitator, International Noncommissioned Officer Leadership Development Course (INLEAD)
- 2017 – 2019 Lead Facilitator, ANG Command Chief Master Sergeant Orientation Course (CCMSTC)

== Professional memberships and associations ==
- ANG Enlisted Field Advisory Council (EFAC)
- Air Force Sergeants’ Association
- Airlift/Tanker Association
- Enlisted Association of the National Guard of the United States
- Security Forces Association – Lifetime

Military offices
| Preceded by Christopher S. Kepner | Senior Enlisted Advisor to the Chief of the National Guard Bureau; 2020–2024 | Succeeded by John T. Raines III |
