= Senior Enlisted Advisor to the Chief of the National Guard Bureau =

Military position in the United States

- Positional colors

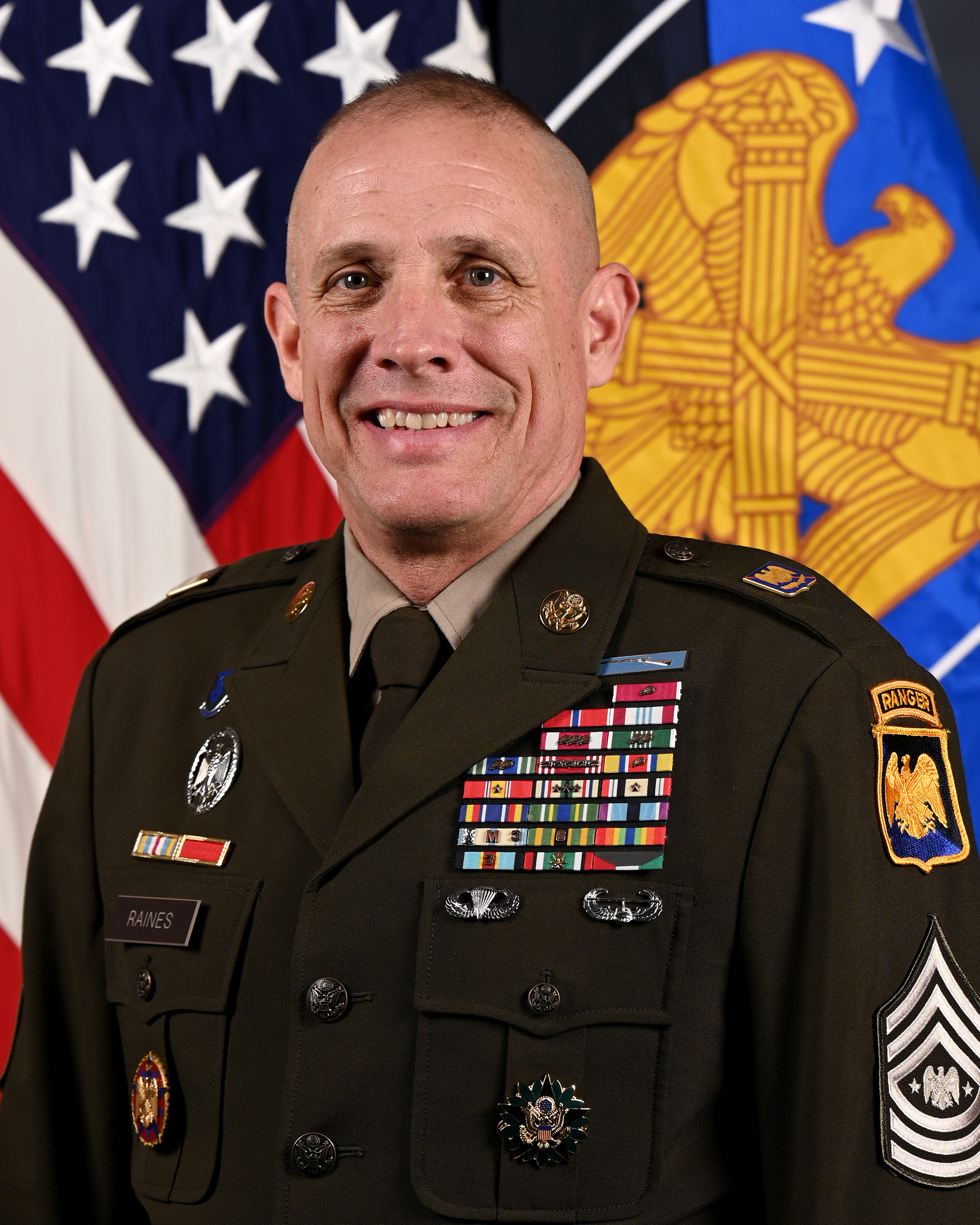
- Incumbent; John T. Raines III, USA since 8 November 2024
- National Guard Bureau
- Type: Senior enlisted advisor
- Abbreviation: SEA
- Member of: Office of the Chief, National Guard Bureau
- Reports to: Chief of the National Guard Bureau
- Formation: November 2003
- First holder: CSM John J. Leonard Jr.
- Salary: $10,758.00 per month, regardless of the incumbent's service longevity
- Website: Official Website

The senior enlisted advisor to the chief of the National Guard Bureau (abbreviated SEA) is the top enlisted person in the National Guard of the United States; which is a joint reserve component of the United States Army and the United States Air Force.

The SEA is designated a special paygrade above E-9. The SEA's responsibilities include advising the chief of the National Guard Bureau on all enlisted matters affecting training and utilization, the health of the force, and enlisted professional development of National Guard soldiers and airmen.

== Insignia ==
As part of Whitehead's appointment in 2020 and Raines's appointment in 2024 respectively, the United States Air Force and United States Army created a unique rank and insignia for the position. The rank insignia face forward depending on the sleeve they are sewn on with the eagle facing forward.

Rank insignia

Special rank for the Army (Service Uniform)

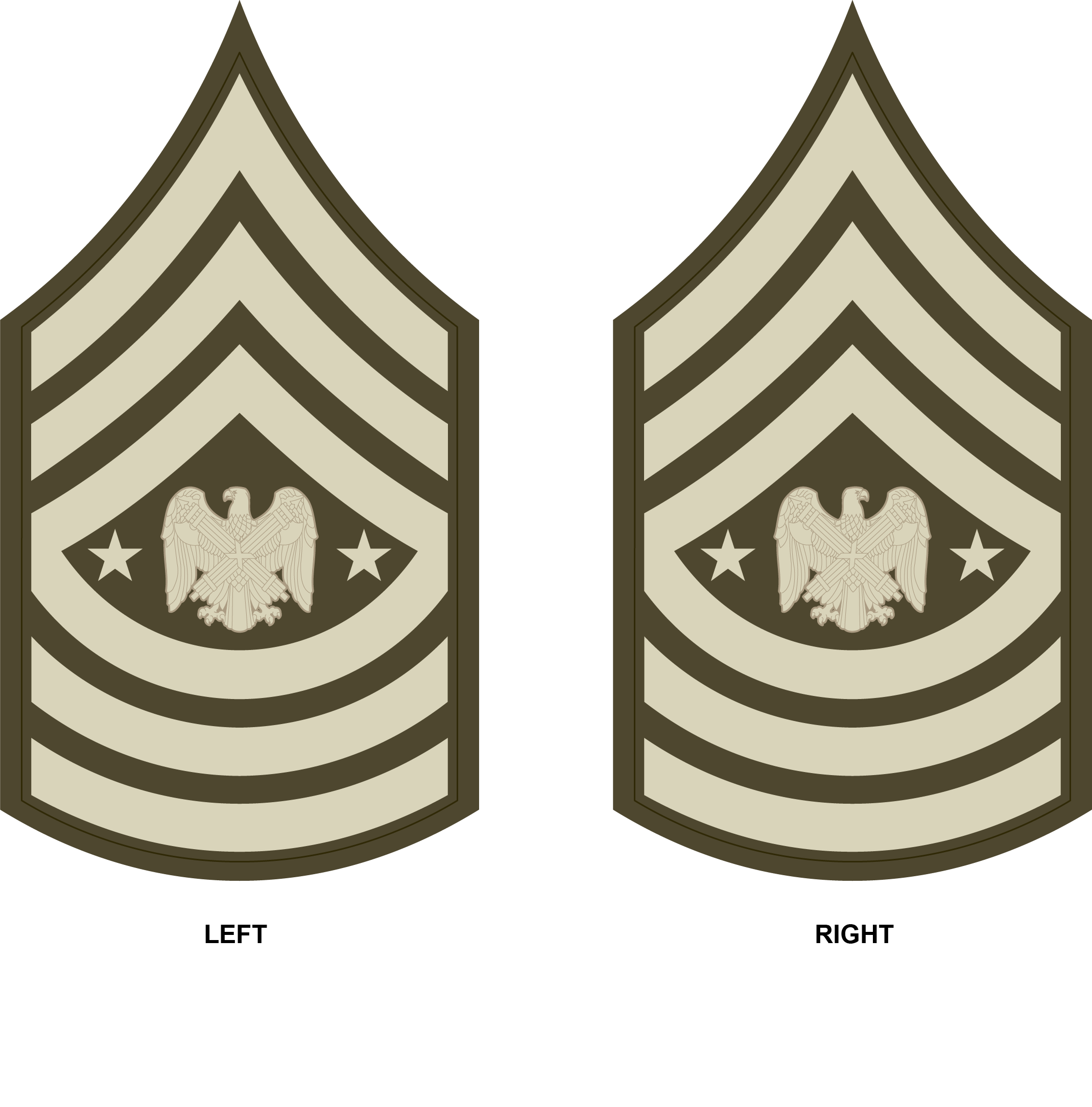
Special rank for the Army (Green Service Uniform)

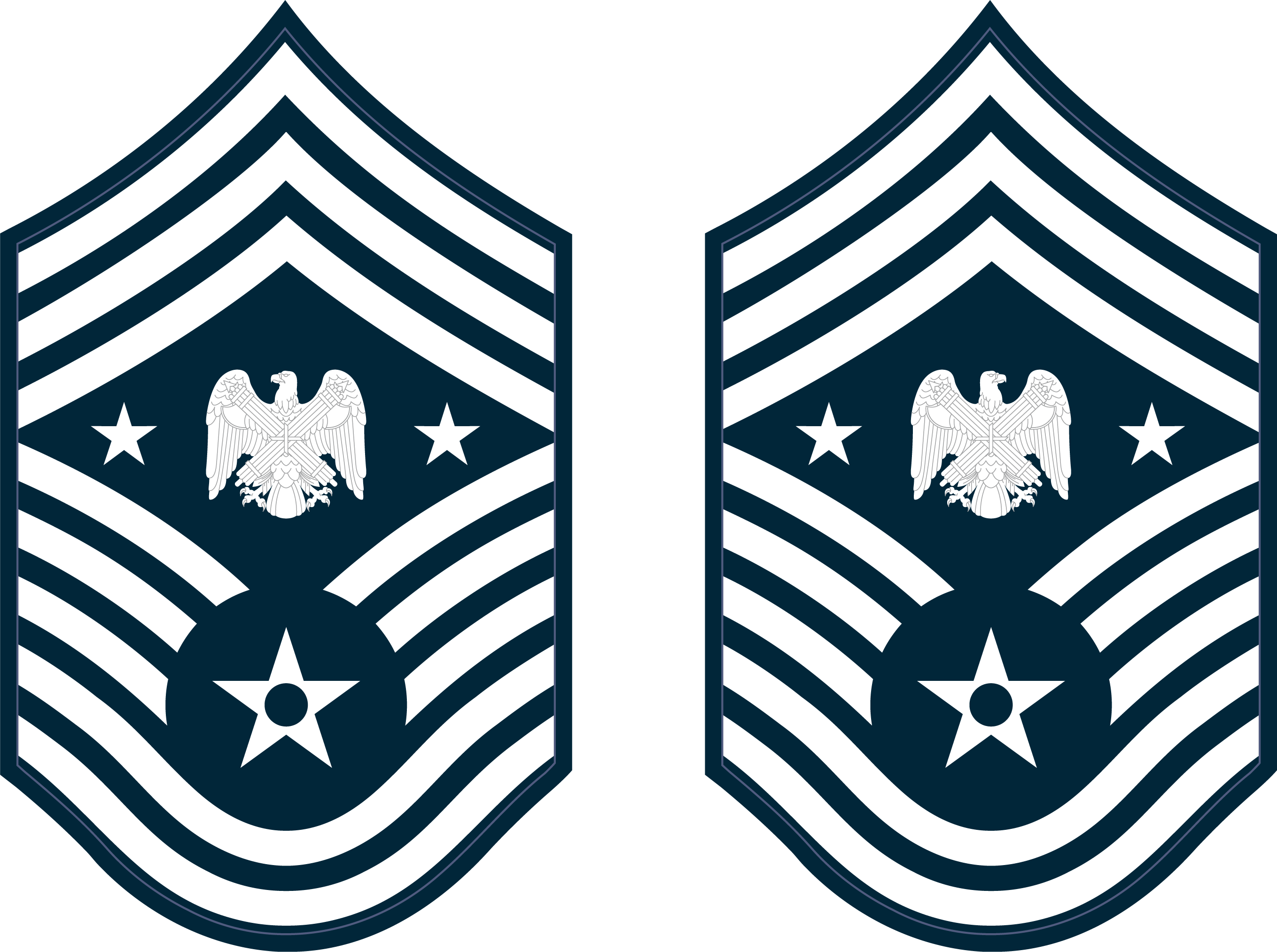
Special rank for the Air Force

== List of officeholders ==
No.	Senior Enlisted Advisor		Term			Service branch	Ref.
No.	Portrait	Name	Took office	Left office	Term length	Service branch	Ref.
1	John J. Leonard Jr.	Command Sergeant Major; John J. Leonard Jr.	November 2003	July 2006	2 years, 242 days	U.S. Army	–
2	David Ray Hudson	Command Sergeant Major; David Ray Hudson	July 2006	February 2010	3 years, 215 days	U.S. Army	–
3	Denise Jelinski-Hall	Command Chief Master Sergeant; Denise Jelinski-Hall	February 2010	July 2013	3 years, 150 days	U.S. Air Force	–
4	Mitchell O. Brush	Command Chief Master Sergeant; Mitchell O. Brush	June 2013	June 2017	4 years, 0 days	U.S. Air Force	–
5	Christopher S. Kepner	Command Sergeant Major; Christopher S. Kepner	June 2017	25 August 2020	3 years, 85 days	U.S. Army	
6	Tony L. Whitehead	Senior Enlisted Advisor; Tony L. Whitehead	25 August 2020	8 November 2024	4 years, 75 days	U.S. Air Force	
7	John T. Raines III	Senior Enlisted Advisor; John T. Raines III	8 November 2024	Incumbent	1 year, 343 days	U.S. Army	

== See also ==
- Chief of the National Guard Bureau
- Vice Chief of the National Guard Bureau
- Command Chief Warrant Officer of the Army National Guard
- Senior Enlisted Advisor to the Chairman of the Joint Chiefs of Staff
- Master Chief Petty Officer of the Navy
- Sergeant Major of the Army
- Command Sergeant Major of the US Army Reserve
- Sergeant Major of the Marine Corps
- Chief Master Sergeant of the Air Force
- Chief Master Sergeant of the Space Force
- Master Chief Petty Officer of the Coast Guard
- Master Chief Petty Officer of the Coast Guard Reserve Force
