= James P. Mullins =

United States Air Force general

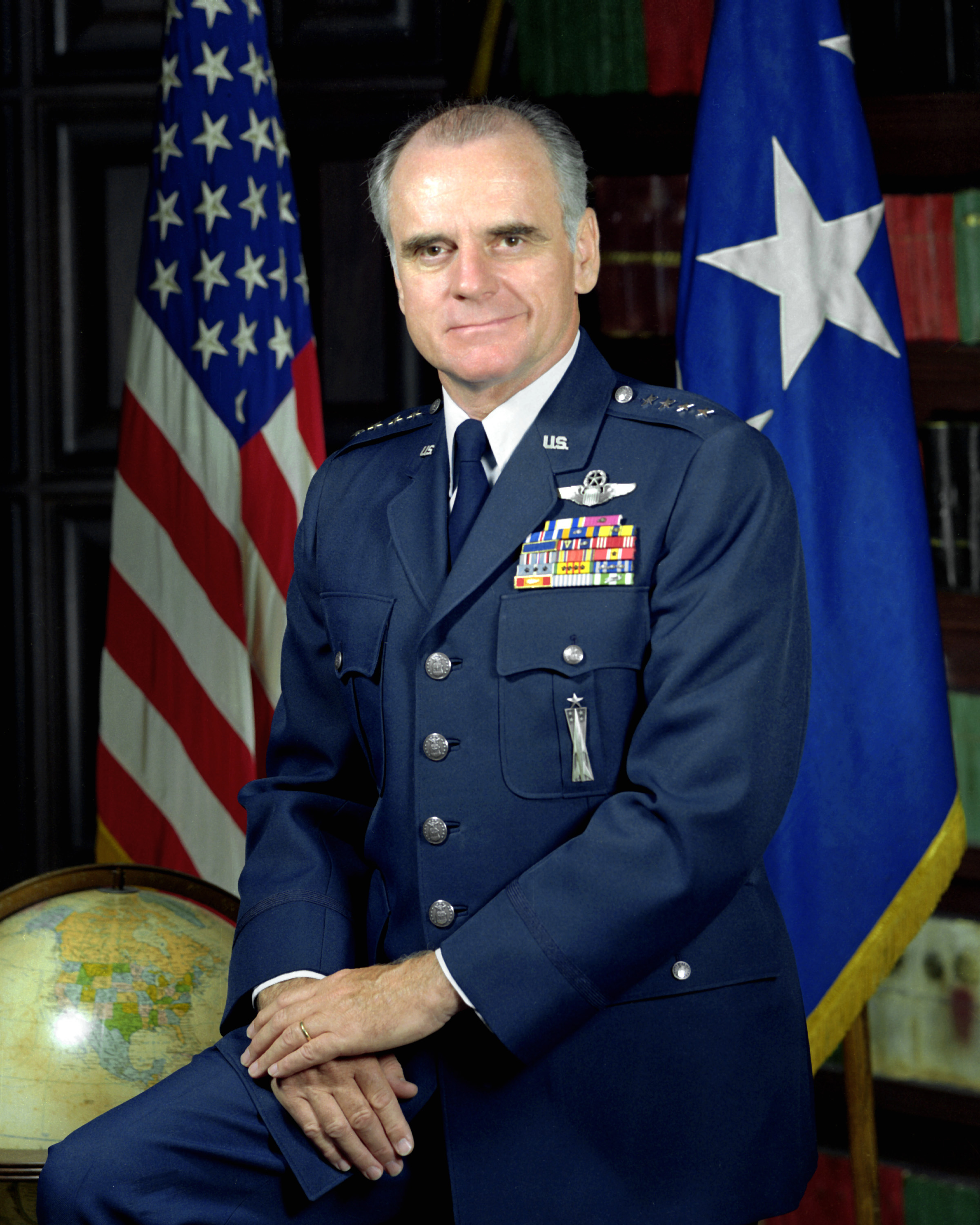
- General James P. Mullins
- Born: September 12, 1928 (age 98); Jersey City, New Jersey
- Military career
- Allegiance: United States of America
- Branch: United States Air Force
- Service years: 1946 - 1984
- Rank: General
- Commands: Air Force Logistics Command; 15th Air Force
- Conflicts: Korean War; Vietnam War
- Awards: Legion of Merit (2); Distinguished Flying Cross; Air Medal (6)

James P. Mullins (born September 12, 1928) is a retired United States Air Force four-star general who served as Commander, Air Force Logistics Command (COMAFLC) from 1981 to 1984.

== Military career ==
Mullins was born in 1928, in Jersey City, New Jersey. He enlisted in the U.S. Army Air Forces in 1946. Mullins entered pilot training as an aviation cadet in 1948 and graduated in 1949 with a commission as a second lieutenant. He was assigned to the 2nd Air Refueling Squadron at Davis-Monthan Air Force Base, Arizona, where he flew KB-29M's, the Strategic Air Command's first aerial tanker.

During the Korean War, Mullins participated in combat evaluation of in-flight refueling systems for fighter aircraft while assigned to the Far East Air Forces Bomber Command at Yokota Air Base, Japan. In January 1953, he returned to the United States and was assigned to the 9th Air Refueling Squadron, initially at Davis-Monthan Air Force Base, and later moving with the unit to Mountain Home Air Force Base, Idaho.

In July 1954, Mullins entered aircraft observer/bombardier training at James Connally Air Force Base, Texas, in preparation for an assignment in January 1955 to the 96th Bombardment Wing at Altus Air Force Base, Oklahoma, as a B-47 aircraft commander. He moved with the wing in 1957 to Dyess Air Force Base, Texas, and served as a B-47 aircraft commander and an air training officer until September 1961. He was then assigned to SAC headquarters, Offutt Air Force Base, Nebraska, as the B/RS-70 requirements officer in the Requirements Division, Office of the Deputy Chief of Staff, Operations. He received a Bachelor of Arts degree in business administration from the University of Omaha in 1964, attended the Air War College at Maxwell Air Force Base, Alabama from August 1966 to July 1967, and then completed RF-4C combat crew training. He also earned a Master of Science degree in international affairs from The George Washington University, Washington D.C., in 1967.

He transferred to Tan Son Nhut Air Base, Republic of Vietnam, in August 1968, where he served with the 460th Tactical Reconnaissance Wing on consecutive assignments as detachment commander, tactical squadron commander and assistant deputy commander for operations. He completed 110 combat missions in RF-4Cs.

Mullins was assigned to Headquarters U.S. Air Force, Washington, D.C., in August 1969 in the Directorate of Operational Requirements and Development Plans, Office of the Deputy Chief of Staff, Research and Development, where he served as chief of the Aircraft Division. He attended the six-week advanced management program at Harvard Business School in 1972. In June 1973, he became vice commander, Ogden Air Materiel Area (later renamed Air Logistics Center), Air Force Logistics Command, Hill Air Force Base, Utah.

He was assigned as deputy chief of staff for acquisition logistics, Air Force Logistics Command at Wright-Patterson Air Force Base, in March 1975. He was reassigned within the command staff as deputy chief of staff for plans and operations in May 1975. This organization was renamed Office of the Deputy Chief of Staff for Plans and Programs in August 1975. He then returned to Hill Air Force Base as commander of the Ogden Air Logistics Center in August 1977.

In November 1978, Mullins took command of 15th Air Force at March Air Force Base, California. He assumed command of Air Force Logistics Command in July 1981. Mullins retired from the Air Force on November 1, 1984.

Mullins was a command pilot with more than 6,000 flying hours.

== Awards and decorations ==
His awards and decorations include:

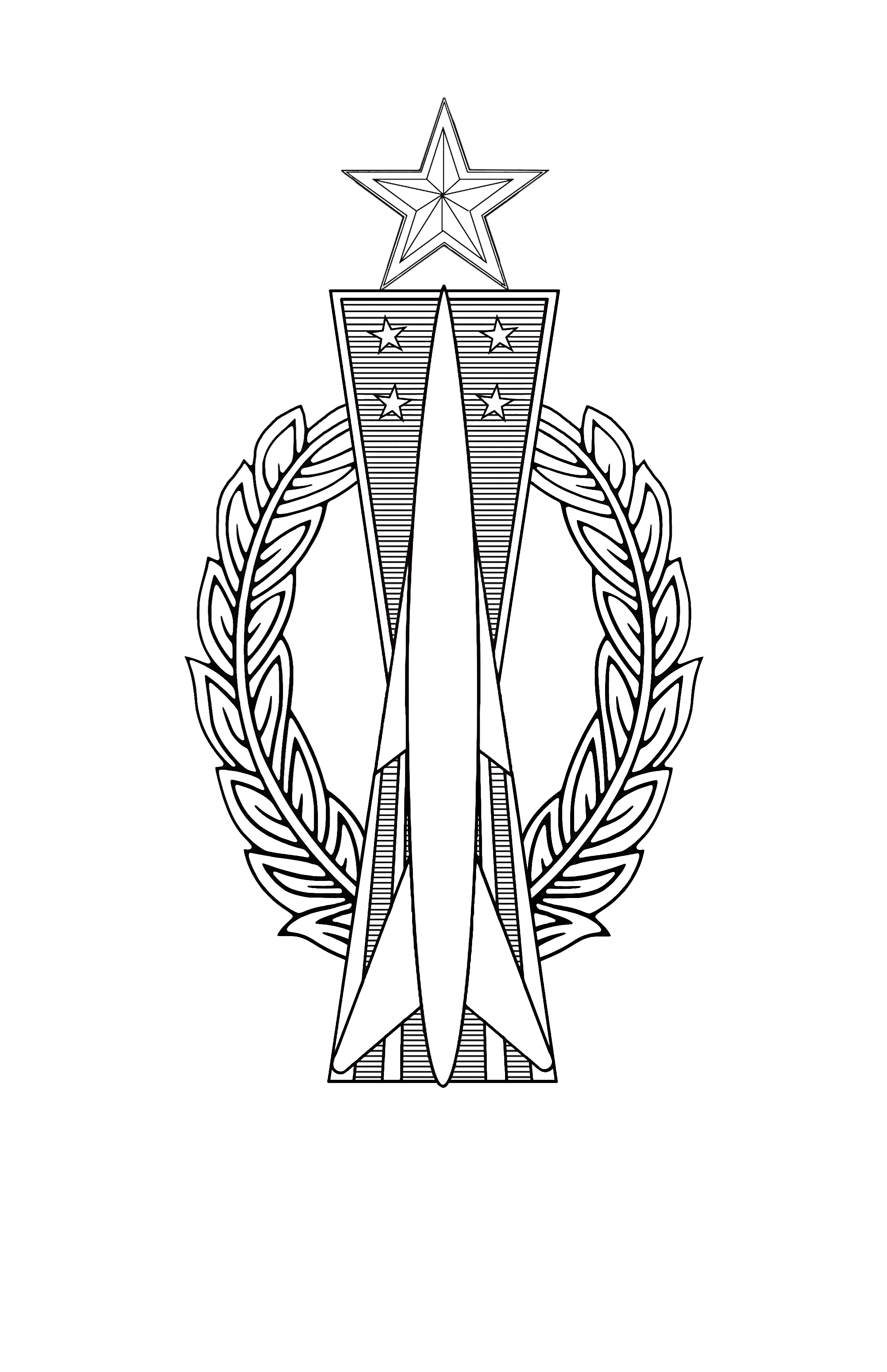

Command Pilot Badge
Air Force Distinguished Service Medal		Legion of Merit with bronze oak leaf cluster
Distinguished Flying Cross	Air Medal with bronze oak leaf cluster	Air and Space Commendation Medal with bronze oak leaf cluster
Air Force; Presidential Unit Citation	Air and Space Outstanding Unit Award with bronze oak leaf cluster and "V" device	Army Good Conduct Medal
Air Force Good Conduct Medal	Army Reserve Good Conduct Medal	National Defense Service Medal with bronze service star
Korean Service Medal with three bronze service stars	Vietnam Service Medal with four bronze service stars	Air and Space Longevity Service Award with three bronze oak leaf clusters
South Vietnam Gallantry Cross with frame and palm	United Nations Service Medal Korea	Vietnam Campaign Medal
senior Missile Operator Badge
