= Epps 1912 Monoplane =

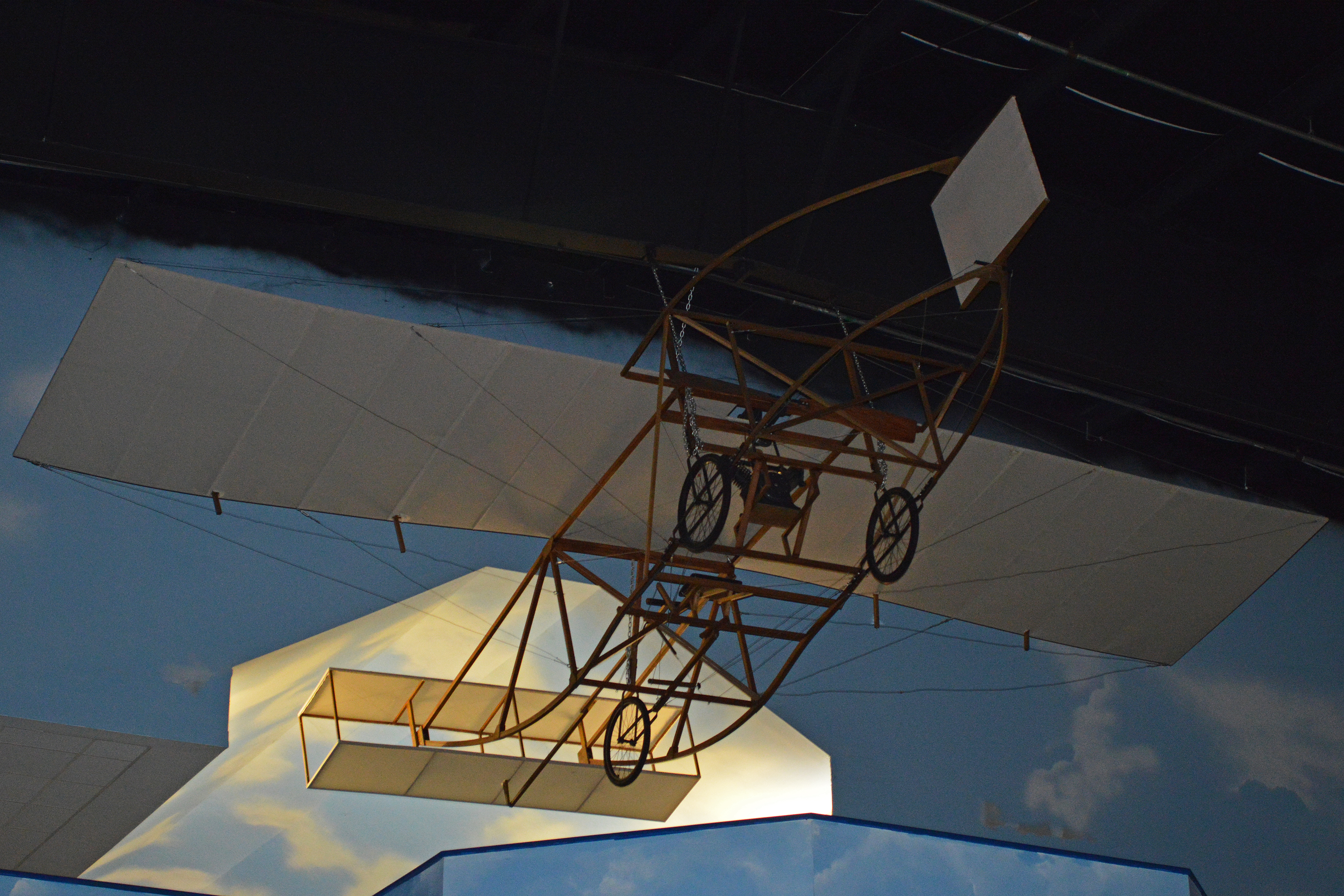
- Epps 1912 Monoplane replica at Museum of Aviation, 2013

General information
- Type: General aviation
- National origin: United States
- Manufacturer: Epps
- Designer: Ben T. Epps

History
- First flight: 1912

The Epps 1912 Monoplane was designed and built in 1911-1912 by Ben T. Epps from Athens, Georgia. It is an open cockpit, single engine, mid-winged, wire braced monoplane, with conventional landing gear supplemented with skids.

== Variants ==
1971 Epps Monoplane
A homebuilt replica of the 1911–1912 monoplane built and flown by Ben Epps Jr.
