= John T. Raines III =

American military advisor

John T. Raines
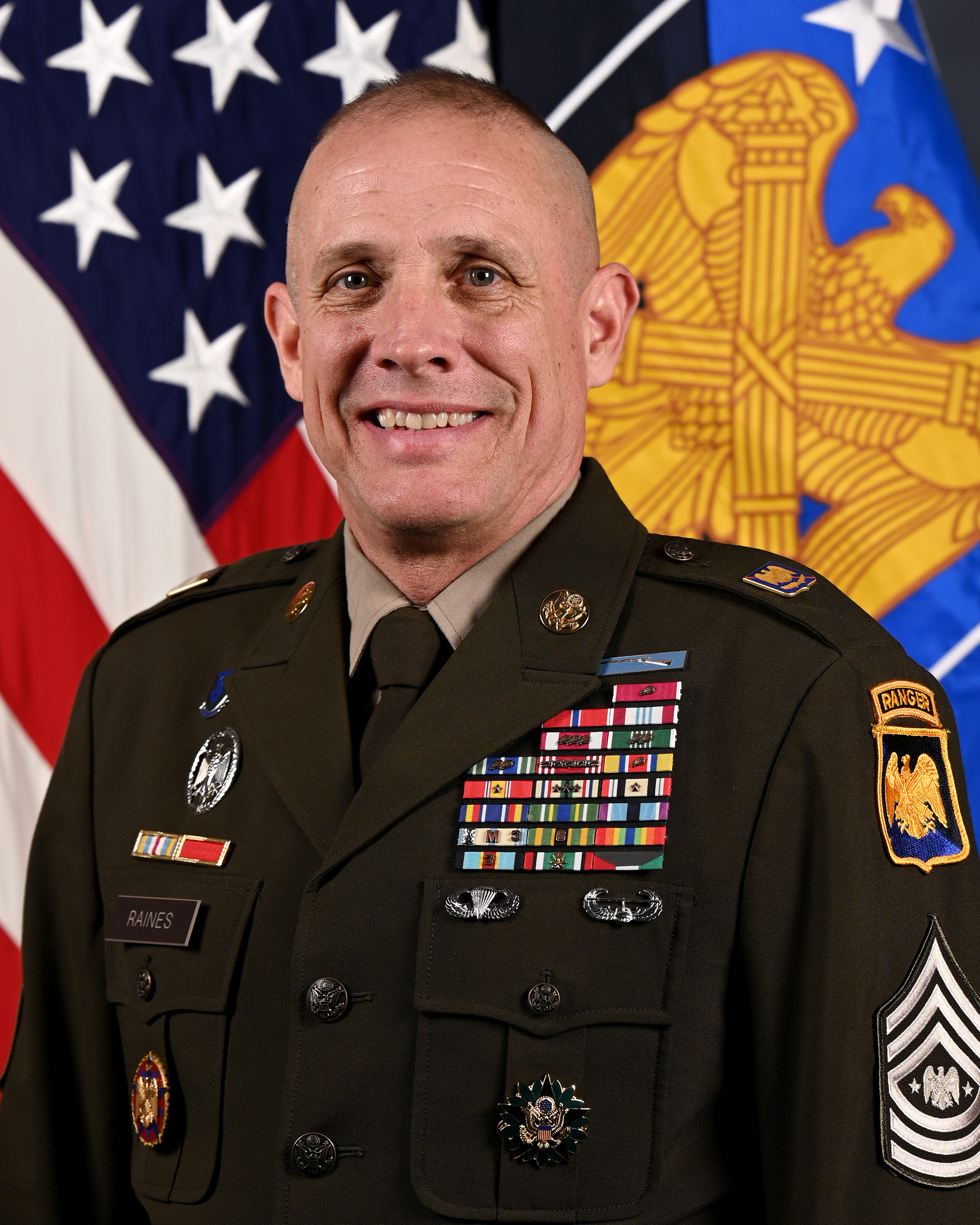
- Military career
- Allegiance: United States
- Branch: United States Army
- Service years: 1989–present
- Rank: Senior Enlisted Advisor to the Chief of the National Guard Bureau
- Conflicts: Gulf War; Iraq War
- Awards: Defense Distinguished Service Medal; Legion of Merit

John T. Raines III is the seventh Senior Enlisted Advisor to the National Guard Bureau since November 8, 2024 and is the main military advisor for training, operations, health of the force, and professional development of enlisted personnel in the ARNG.

Raines enlisted active duty in the Army in August 1989 completed basic military training and advanced individual training at Ft. Jackson, South Carolina, and Ft. Gordon, Georgia, as a 31N Communications Specialist before reclassifying as an 11B Infantryman at Ft. Moore, Georgia.

SEA Raines’ deployments include Desert Shield, Desert Storm, and Operation Iraqi Freedom. He was activated in support of Operation Noble Eagle.

Raines, born in Alabama, is married to Karen Raines has a daughter Stephanie and a son Richard as well as four grandchildren.

== Awards and decorations ==
His awards and decorations include:

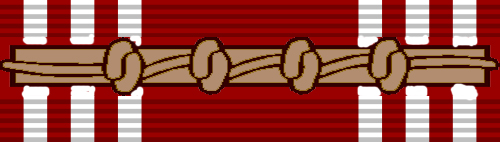

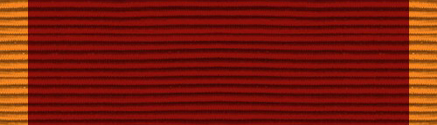

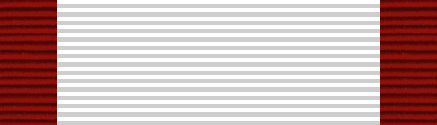

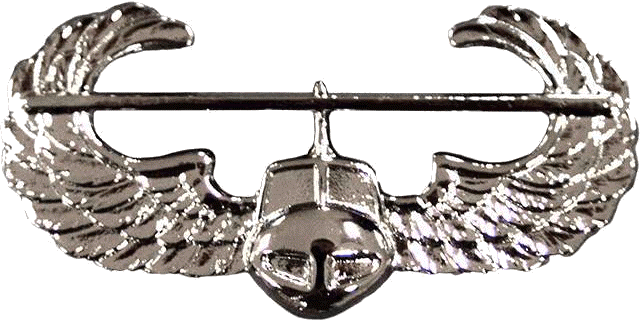

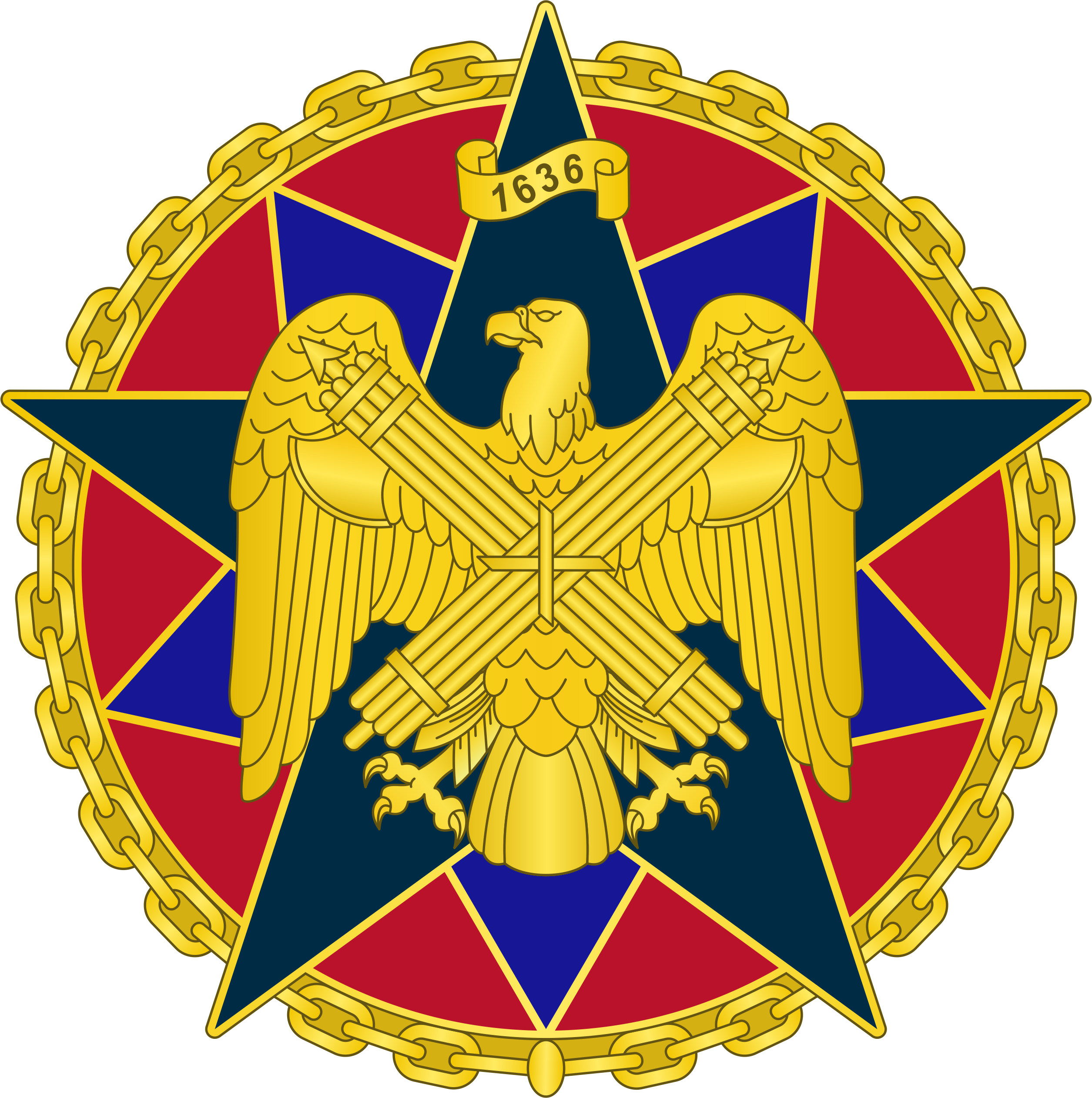

Combat Infantry Badge
| Legion of Merit with oak leaf cluster | | Bronze Star |
| Defense Meritorious Service Medal | Meritorious Service Medal with three oak leaf clusters | Army Commendation Medal with two oak leaf clusters |
| Army Achievement Medal with two oak leaf clusters | Good Conduct Medal with four Award Clasps | Army Reserve Components Achievement Medal with silver oak leaf cluster |
| National Defense Service Medal with bronze service star | Southwest Asia Service Medal with three bronze service stars | Good Conduct Medal with four Award Clasps |
| Army Reserve Components Achievement Medal with silver oak leaf cluster | National Defense Service Medal with bronze service star | Southwest Asia Service Medal with three bronze service stars |
| Iraq Campaign Medal with bronze service star | Global War on Terrorism Service Medal with bronze award numeral 1 | Global War on Terrorism Expeditionary Medal |
| Korea Defense Service Medal | Humanitarian Service Medal | Armed Forces Reserve Medal |
| Non-Commissioned Officer Professional Development Ribbon with Award numeral "6" | Army Service Ribbon | Army Overseas Service Ribbon with Award numeral "3" |
| Saudi Arabian Kuwait Liberation Medal | Kuwaitian Arabian Kuwait Liberation Medal | Joint Meritorious Unit Award |
| Alabama Distinguished Service Medal | Mississippi Magnolia Cross | Mississippi Magnolia Medal |
Ranger Tab
United States Army Parachutist Badge
Air Assault Badge
National Guard Bureau Organizational Badge

== Army Skill Badges ==
- Ranger Tab
- Expert Infantryman's Badge
- Parachutist Badge
- Air Assault Badge

== Promotions ==
- Sergeant, 1 December 1993
- Staff Sergeant, 1 June 1996
- Sergeant First Class, 10 July 2001
- First Sergeant, 1 August 2003
- Sergeant Major, 1 May 2008
- Command Sergeant Major, 1 February 2010
- Senior Enlisted Advisor to the National Guard Bureau, 8 November 2024

== Assignments ==
1. August 1993 – November 1993, Infantry Fire Team Leader, 1/503rd Infantry Battalion (AASLT), Republic of Korea
2. November 1993 – June 1994, Infantry Squad Leader, 1/503rd Infantry Battalion (AASLT), Republic of Korea
3. June 1994 – December 1996, Infantry Weapons Squad Leader, 2/327th Infantry Battalion (AASLT), Ft. Campbell, KY
4. December 1996 – December 1997, Infantry Squad Leader, 2/327th Infantry Battalion (AASLT), Ft. Campbell, KY
5. December 1997 – July 2001, Infantry Dismount Squad Leader, 1/167th Infantry Battalion, Leeds, AL
6. July 2001 – October 2001, Infantry Battalion Comm Chief, 1/167th Infantry Battalion, Talladega, AL
7. October 2001 – May 2002, Infantry Platoon Sergeant, 1/167th Infantry Battalion, Anniston Army Depot (Activated)
8. May 2002 – July 2004, Infantry First Sergeant, 1/167th Infantry Battalion, Pelham, AL
9. July 2004 – May 2008, 47th Civil Support Team First Sergeant, Mississippi Army National Guard, Flowood, MS
10. May 2008 – June 2009, Combined Arms Battalion Operations SGM, 2-198th, Combined Arms Battalion, MSARNG, Senatobia, MS
11. June 2009 – March 2010, Battalion CSM, 2-198th CAB, MSARNG, Q-West, Iraq
12. March 2010 – December 2010, Combined Arms Battalion Operations SGM, 2-198th CAB, MSARNG, Senatobia, MS
13. December 2010 – June 2011, NCOA Commandant, 2-154th RTI, MSARNG, Camp Shelby, MS
14. June 2011 – October 2012, Regimental CSM, 154th RTI, MSARNG, Camp Shelby, MS
15. October 2012 – March 2014, J3 Sergeant Major, MSNG, Jackson, MS
16. March 2014 – July 2015, J3 Senior Enlisted Leader, United States Indo-Pacific Command, Camp Smith, HI
17. July 2015 – December 2016, MSARNG State CSM, MSARNG, Jackson, MS
18. December 2016 – June 2021, MSNG Command Senior Enlisted Leader, Jackson, MS
19. June 2021 – February 2022, Executive Officer for the Chief of the National Guard Bureau’s Senior Enlisted Advisor
20. February 2022 – November 2024, 13th ARNG Command Sergeant Major
21. November 2024 – Present, 7th SEA to the Chief of the National Guard Bureau, Pentagon, Washington, DC

Military offices
| Preceded by Tony L. Whitehead | Senior Enlisted Advisor to the Chief of the National Guard Bureau; 2024–present | Incumbent |
