= National Guard Bureau =

Federal agency responsible for the administration of the United States National Guard

- Seal of the NGB
- Active: 1903; 123 years ago
- Country: United States
- Allegiance: U.S. Department of Defense
- Type: National Guard
- Size: 104,974 airmen 325,066 soldiers 430,040 joint personnel
- Part of: Joint Chiefs of Staff
- Website: nationalguard.mil

Commanders
- Chief: Gen Steven S. Nordhaus, USAF
- Vice Chief: GEN Thomas M. Carden Jr., USA
- Senior Enlisted Advisor: SEANGB John T. Raines III, USA

Insignia
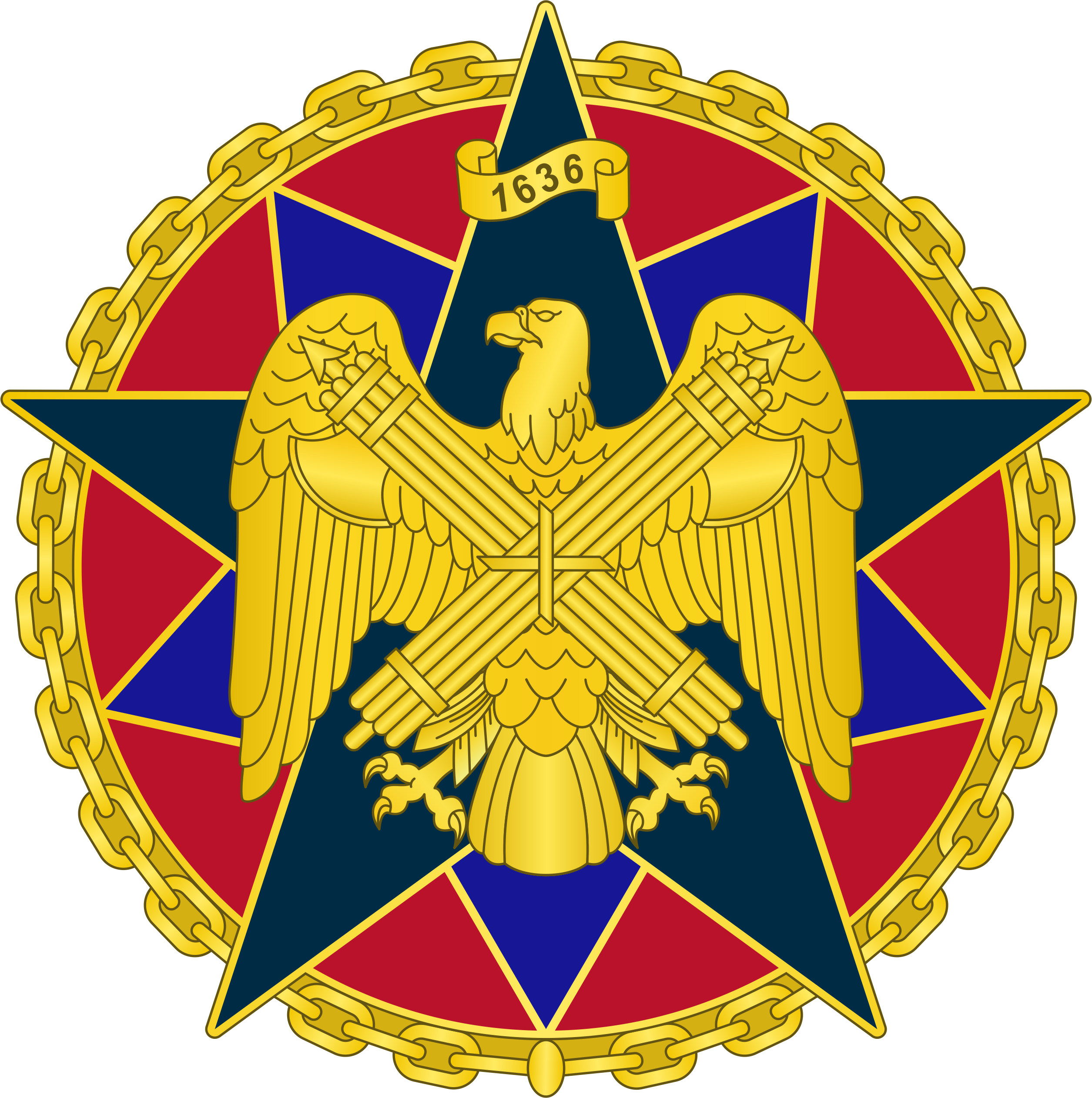
- NGB Organizational Badge

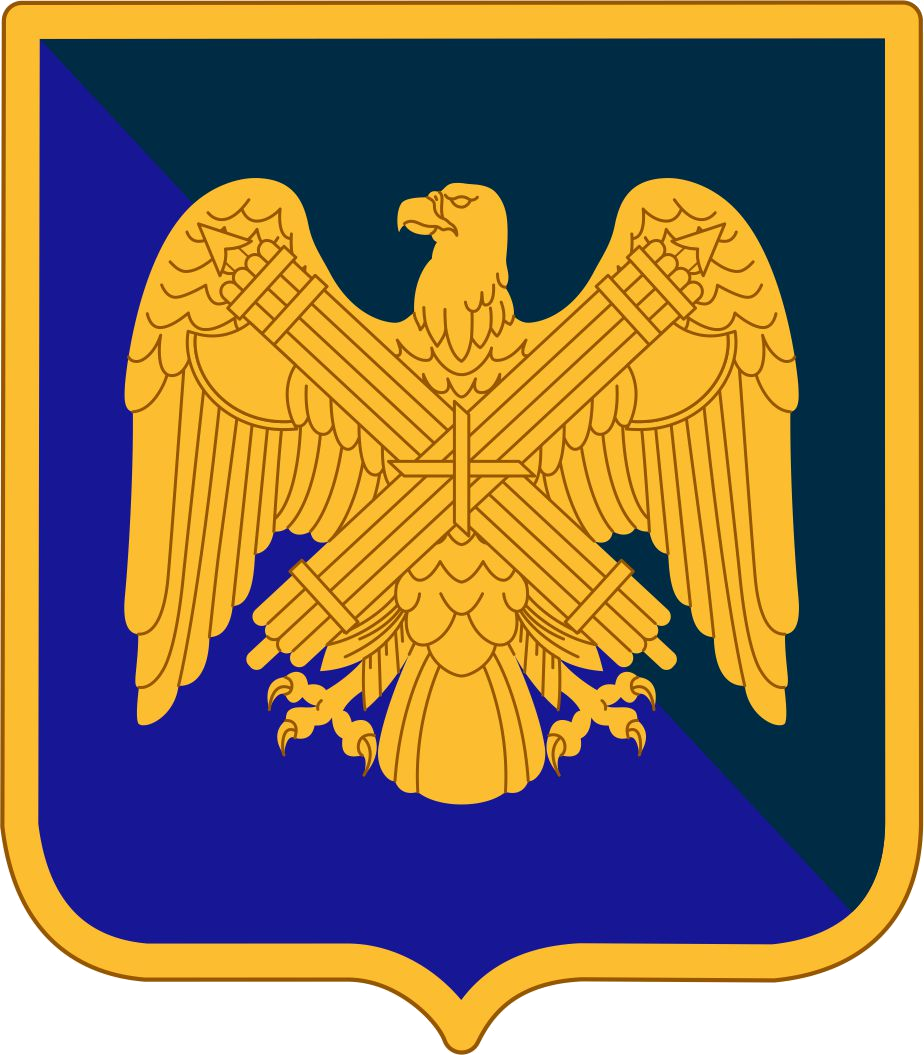
- Shoulder sleeve insignia of National Guard members assigned to the NGB

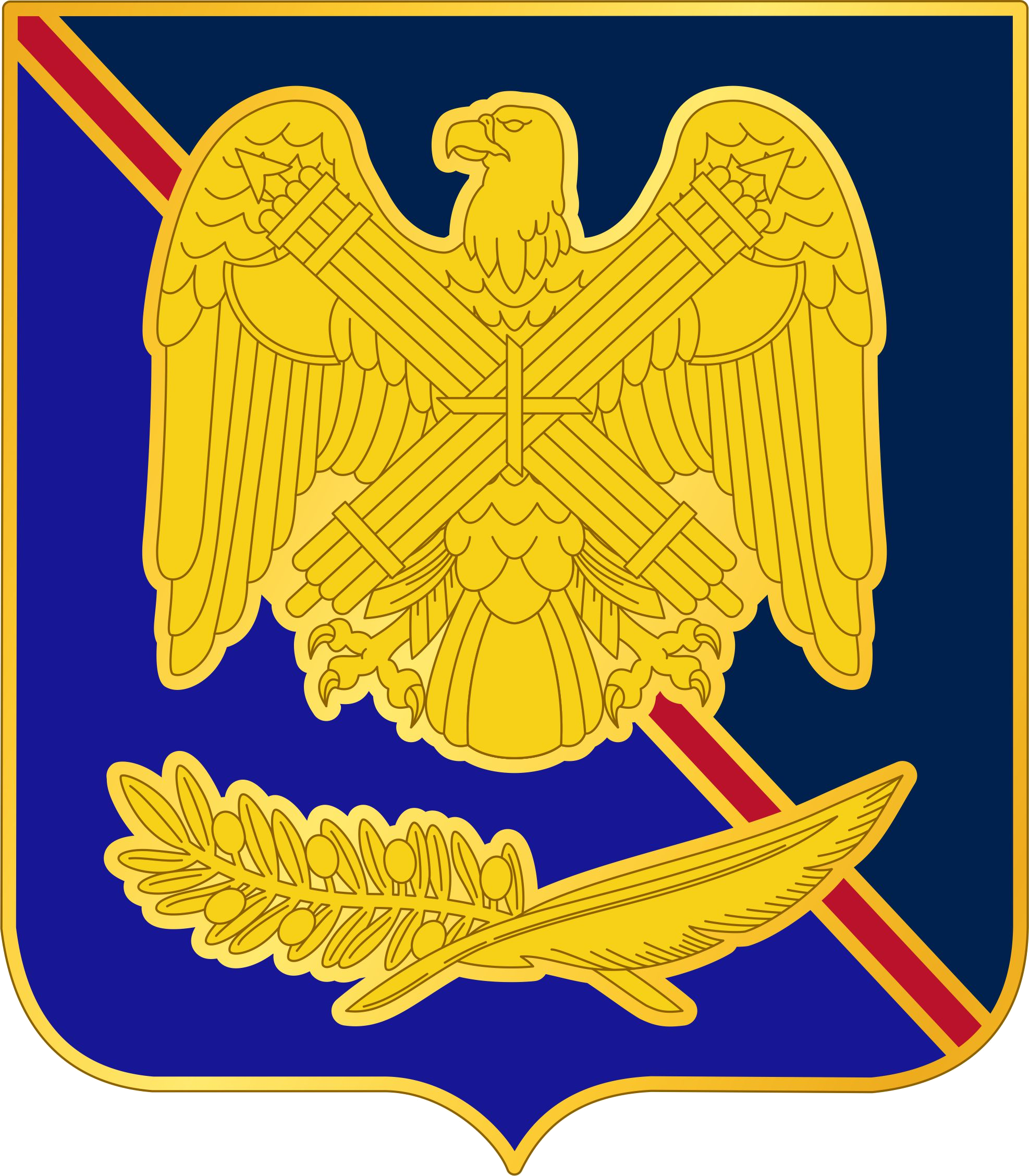
- Distinctive Unit Insignia of Army National Guard members assigned to the NGB

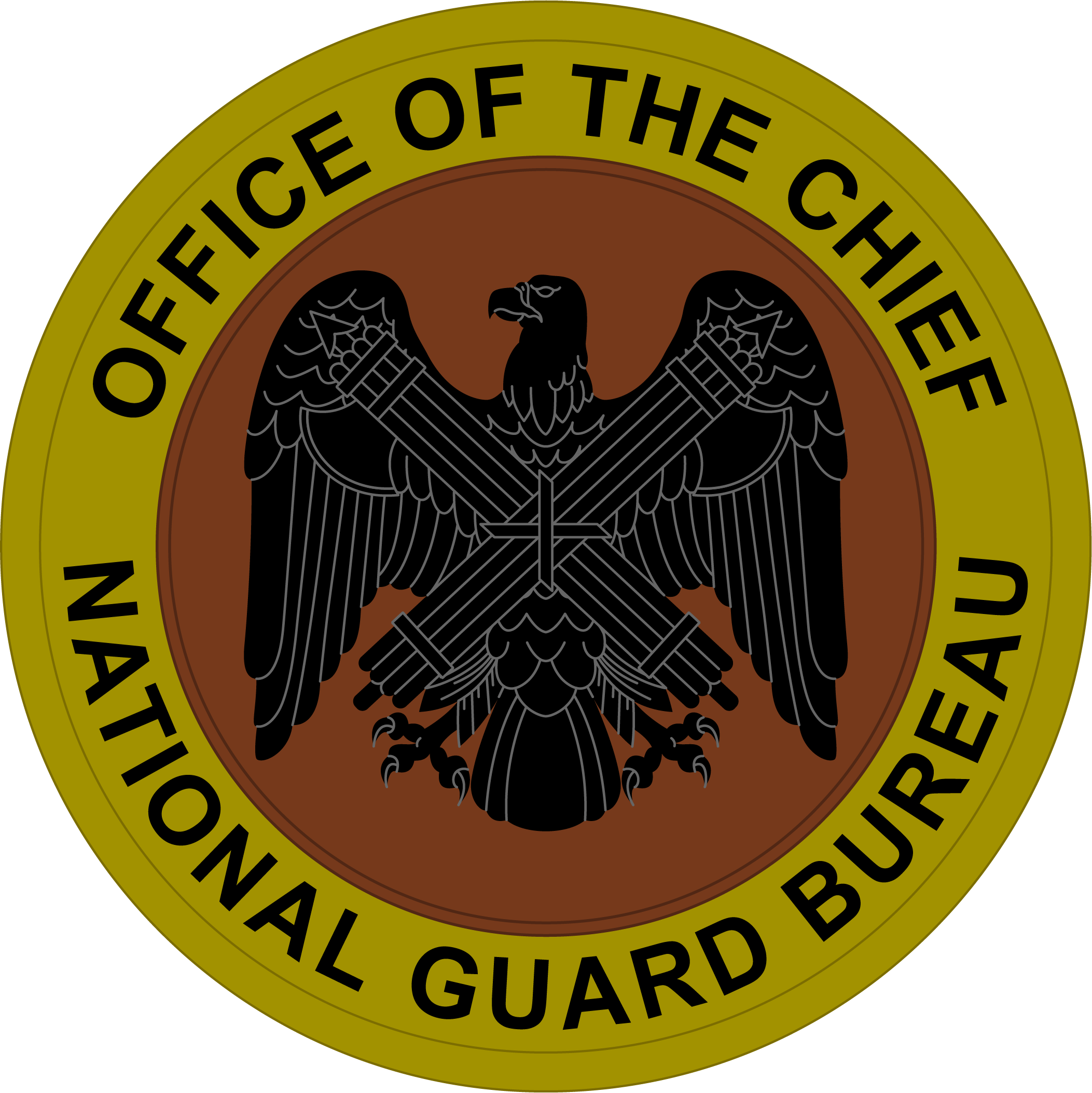
- Patch of Air National Guard members assigned to the Office of the Chief, NGB

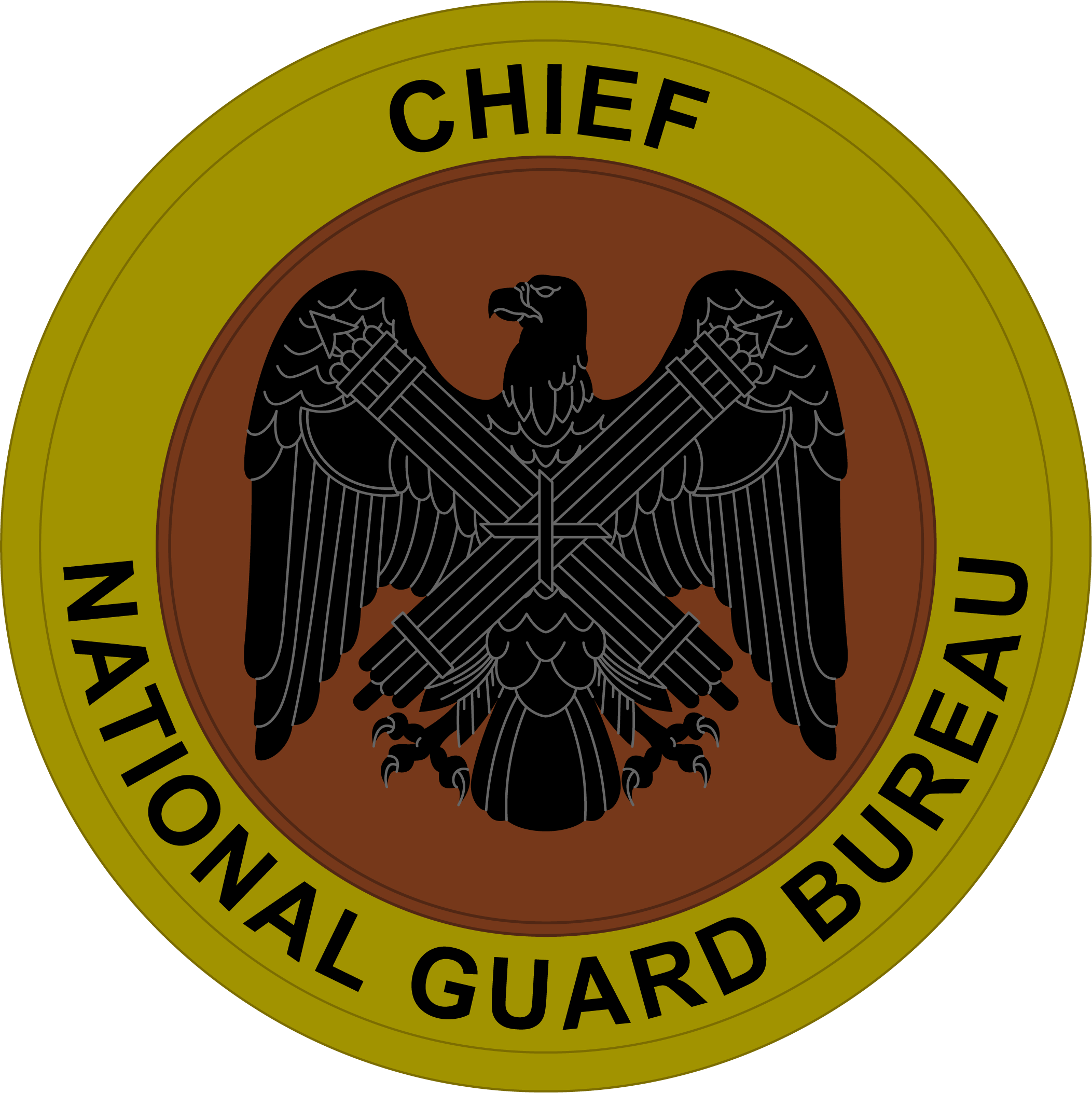
- Patch of Air National Guard members assigned to the Chief, NGB

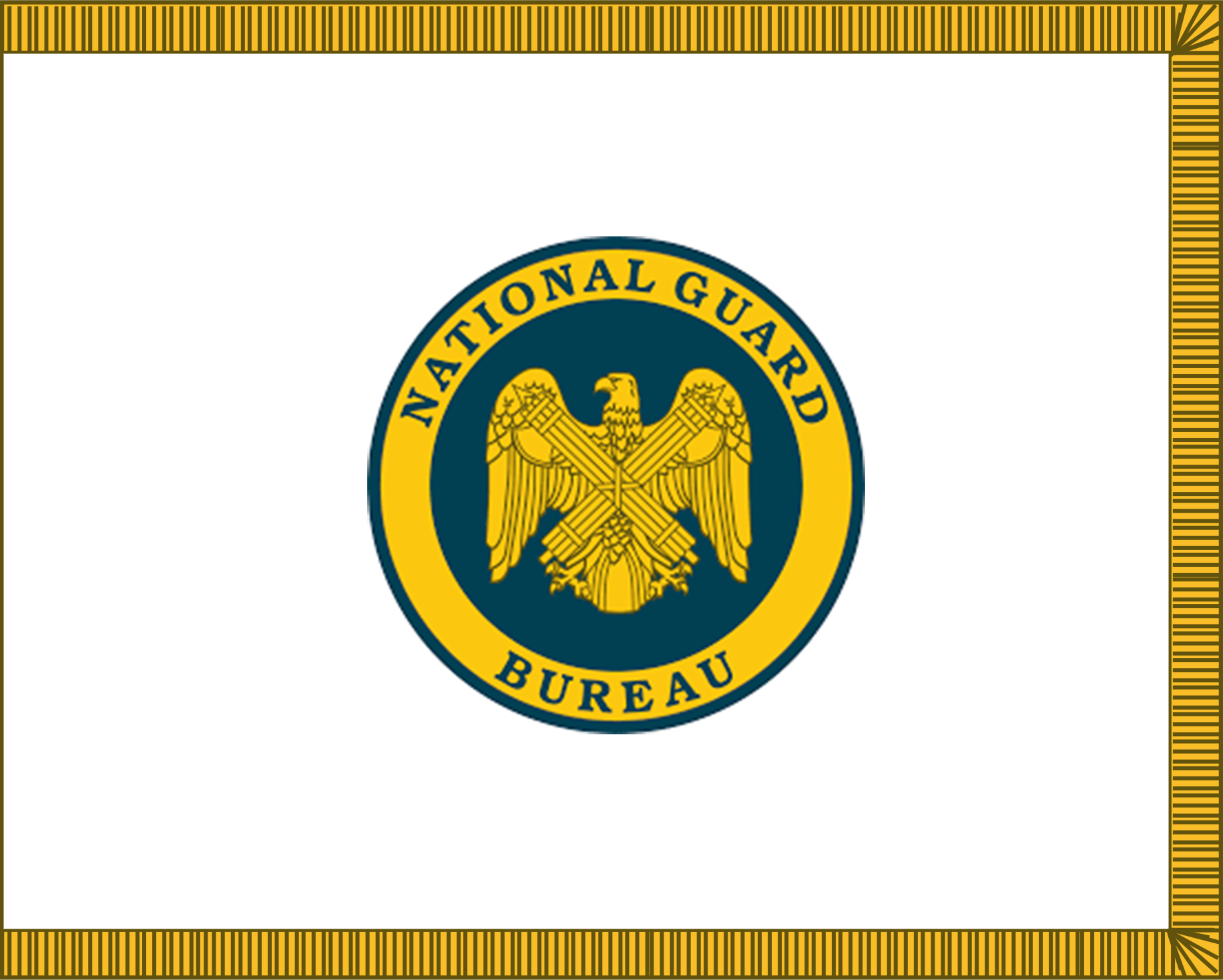
- National Guard Bureau Flag

The National Guard Bureau (NGB) is the federal agency responsible for the administration of the National Guard established by the United States Congress as a joint bureau of the Department of the Army and the Department of the Air Force. It was created by the Militia Act of 1903. The National Defense Authorization Act for Fiscal Year 2008, elevated the National Guard to a joint function of the Department of Defense. The 2007 NDAA, from the previous year, elevated the chief of the National Guard Bureau from a lieutenant general to a four-star general.

== Militia Act of 1903 ==
United States secretary of war Elihu Root militated for reform of the militia, in annual reports of 1901 and 1903, and in public letters. He argued that state militias should be more like the Army in discipline, uniforms, equipment, and training, to mitigate problems that arose in the U.S. Civil War and the recent Spanish–American War of 1898. The Militia Act of 1792 was posited to be obsolete. The resulting Militia Act of 1903 (or Dick Act) became law. It gave federal status to the militia and required the organized militia of the States to conform to Regular Army organization and standards. It dramatically increased federal funding of the militia: between 1903 and 1916, the federal government spent $53 million on the Guard, more than the total of the previous hundred years.

The 1903 act authorized the creation of a separate section responsible for National Guard affairs. Located in the Miscellaneous Division of the Adjutant General's office, this small section, headed by Major James Parker, Cavalry, with four clerks, was the predecessor of today's National Guard Bureau.

This section remained under the supervision of the Adjutant General's Office until War Department Orders on February 12, 1908 created the Division of Militia Affairs in the Office of the Secretary of War. The Division remained a part of the Office of the Secretary of War until July 25, 1910 when the chief was directed to report directly to the Army chief of staff. The Division continued to perform under the direct jurisdiction of the chief of staff until the passage of the National Defense Act of June 3, 1916. Then the Division of Militia Affairs became the Militia Bureau of the War Department, under the direct supervision of the secretary of war.

== Division becomes a bureau ==
The National Defense Act of 1916 stated that all units would have to be federally recognized, and that the qualifications for officers would be set by the War Department. It increased the number of annual training days to 15, increased the number of yearly drills to 48, and authorized pay for drills.

The 1916 act transformed the Division of Militia Affairs into a separate Militia Bureau, increasing its autonomy and authority. Eight new civilian positions were authorized, something which the various chiefs had been requesting for years; the number of military assigned to the Bureau had grown to 13. The National Defense Act also authorized the president to assign two National Guard officers to duty with the Militia Bureau. The inclusion of National Guard officers in the Militia Bureau was an important step towards creating a centralized planning organization for the National Guard headed by its own officers. The first National Guard officer assigned to the Bureau was Major Louis C. Wilson of Texas in 1916.

On September 11, 1917, War Department General Order 119 stated that the jurisdiction of the Militia Bureau includes "coordination through the office of the chief of staff, of the organization, equipment, and instruction of the National Guard under department commanders in a manner similar to the coordination by the chief of staff of the organization, equipment, and training of the Regular Army under department commanders." Thus the National Guard Bureau was charged with the responsibility of maintaining high standards in the National Guard.

Prior to 1910 the chief of the Militia Bureau was a Regular Army officer. This situation changed on June 4, 1920, when Congress passed an amendment to the National Defense Act of 1916. One of the amendment's conditions stated that effective January 1, 1921, the chief of the National Guard Bureau would be selected from lists of present or former National Guard officers.

The act reads:

The Chief National Guard Bureau shall be appointed by the President, by and with the advice and consent of the Senate, by selection from the lists of officers of the National Guard of the United States recommended as suitable for such appointment by their respective Governors, and who have had ten or more years commissioned service in the National Guard ... The Chief of the National Guard Bureau shall hold office for four years unless sooner removed for cause, and shall not be eligible to succeed himself ... Upon accepting his office, the CNGB shall be appointed a Major General in the National Guard of the United States, and commissioned in the Army of the United States, and while serving shall have the rank, pay, and allowances of a Major General.

The act was later amended so that the chief could succeed himself.

The first appointee under these provisions was Major General George C. Rickards of Pennsylvania. The amendment also provided for the creation of a General Staff committee of National Guard officers, which could recommend policies affecting the Guard.

The Bureau was known as the Militia Bureau until it was designated as the National Guard Bureau by an amendment to Section 81 of the National Defense Act on June 15, 1933. Furthermore, this amendment worked towards settling the issue of the National Guard as a reserve component. It stated that there would be two National Guards: the National Guard of the several states, and the National Guard of the United States. The former would be the individual state militias, employed in local emergencies and national defense. The latter would be considered a deployable reserve component of the regular United States Army.

== National Guard Bureau during World War II ==
On 1 September 1939, the Hitler regime had begun World war II by invading Poland. In May and June 1940, the Wehrmacht had defeated France. Until Japan's attack on Pearl Harbor, the Roosevelt government stayed neutral.
The National Guard began mobilization on September 16, 1940, and a total of 18 National Guard Divisions (plus one more assembled from National Guard units), as well as 29 National Guard Army Air Forces observation squadrons saw action in both the Pacific and European Theatres. The National Guard Bureau also experienced changes during the war years.

The first of these changes occurred on March 2, 1942, under War Department Circular number 59. This order reorganized the War Department and Army under the authority of the first War Powers Act. It specifically affected the Bureau by designating it as a part of the Adjutant General's Office. On April 27 1942, General Orders No. 9, Headquarters, Service and Supply, established the National Guard Bureau as an "independent administrative service of the Services of Supply," under the jurisdiction of the chief of administrative services.

The third major order affecting the National Guard Bureau was Army Service Forces (ASF) circular No. 118, which came on November 11, 1943. It stipulated that the chief of the National Guard Bureau was directed to report to the Commanding General, Army Service Forces. On May 17, 1945, General Order No. 39 stated that the National Guard Bureau was removed from the jurisdiction of the Commanding General Army Service Forces, and established it as a war Department Special Staff activity.

With the entire National Guard on federal service, the mission and functions of the Bureau were reduced. A large part of the Bureau's wartime work consisted of managing the State Guards which in wartime took over a great deal of the Guard's state mission, and keeping up the personnel records of federally recognized National Guard officers on active duty.

The number of military officers assigned to the Bureau declined sharply, and the number of the Bureau's civilian personnel went from 140 in 1940 to 49 in 1945. There were practically no promotions awarded to National Guard Bureau civilians, which did not compare favorably with other War Department agencies. This made retaining those few key civilian employees needed in maintaining good relations with the States and working towards planning the post-war reorganization of the National Guard extremely difficult.

== Post-war National Guard Bureau ==
During the war years, annual leave was restricted for all War Department civilian employees. National Guard Bureau civilian personnel certainly could have been spared, since their workload had been greatly reduced. When the freeze on annual leave was limited in 1945 civilian employees were compelled to use their leave or lose it. At the war's end the National Guard Bureau desperately needed full military and civilian staff, for the task of reorganizing the National Guard in the states. However, the number of personnel was not expanded quickly enough to facilitate such activity. The frantic post-war reorganization of the National Guard was coordinated by an under-staffed Guard Bureau.

In addition to the reorganization of the National Guard, the Bureau also had to deal with internal reorganizations. The most important of these was the creation of the Air Force and consequently, the Air National Guard. Under the National Security Act of July 26, 1947, Congress approved the creation of a separate division within the National Guard Bureau for the Air National Guard, thus transferring the functions, powers, and duties from the Department of the Army and the Secretary of the Army to the Department of the Air Force and the Secretary of the Air Force.

After World War II the National Guard Bureau and the Army Air Forces jointly prepared a plan for the Air National Guard. Among the foreseeable problems were supplies of aircraft, type and distribution of units, training, recruitment of trained personnel, and strength in relation to the Air Force and Air Force Reserve. In 1946 a plan calling for the creation of 12 wings, 27 groups, and 84 fighter and light bombardment squadrons was authorized and tendered to the States. June 30, 1946 saw the federal recognition of the first post-war Air Guard unit, the 120th Fighter Squadron, based at Buckley Field, Denver, Colorado.

Although the projected date of July 1, 1947 for organizing all Air Guard units could not be met due to drastic cuts in federal funding (the Air Guard only received $154 million instead of the requested $536 million during FY 1947–1949), by May 1949, 514 units had been organized and federally recognized. In 1949 the Army and Air Force Authorization Act (Public Law 604, 81st Congress) formally established a legal existence which provided that the Air Force of the United States shall consist of, among other components, the Air National Guard of the U.S., composed of federally recognized units and personnel of the several States. This Act established an independent relationship for the Air Guard, separate from the Air Force. It ensured that the Air Guard would remain state controlled.

To facilitate the dual function of the National Guard Bureau, the Departments of the Army and Air Force, along with the NGB, reorganized the latter agency on October 1, 1948. This reorganization established the NGB as a Bureau of the Department of the Army and an agency of the Department of the Air Force. The reorganization of the NGB included the creation of the Legal Adviser, the Information Office, the Administrative Office, and the Planning Office. It also established the chief of the National Guard Bureau (CNGB) as the head of the two component divisions, the Army Division and the Air Division. It provided for a major general of the appropriate service, commissioned in the National Guard, to be appointed as chief of each of the respective Divisions. The Army and Air Force Authorization Act also stipulated that the National Guard Bureau would perform similar functions and duties for the Department of the Air Force as it performed for the Department of the Army and would be a formal channel of communication between the Department of the Air Force and the several States on matters pertaining to the ANG.

== Modern National Guard ==
As of 2017, the mission of the National Guard Bureau is to participate with the Army and Air Force staffs in programs pertaining to the National Guard. The NGB is responsible for administering programs for the development and maintenance of Army and Air National Guard units in the 50 states, the Commonwealth of Puerto Rico, the District of Columbia, the Virgin Islands, and Guam. There are many programs administered through NGB that serve youth populations, including the Youth Challenge Program, Partners in Education, HUMVEE School Program, YOU CAN School Program, and Guard Fit Challenge.

As of December 31, 2011, the chief of the National Guard Bureau is a member of the Joint Chiefs of Staff.

Army lieutenant general Tom Carden was confirmed by the Senate as vice chief of the NGB on January 12, 2026, replacing acting vice chief Timothy L. Rieger.

== See also ==
- Chief of the National Guard Bureau
- Vice Chief of the National Guard Bureau
- Senior Enlisted Advisor to the Chief of the National Guard Bureau
- National Guard of the United States
- Army National Guard of the United States
- Air National Guard of the United States
- Space National Guard of the United States (proposed)
