= Museum of Aviation (Warner Robins) =

Aerospace museum at Robins Air Force Base in Georgia, US

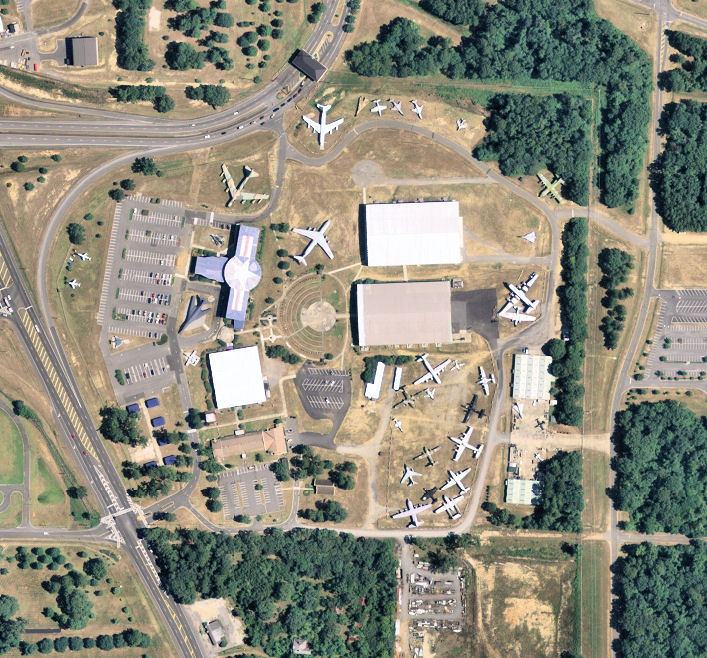
- 2006 aerial photo of museum buildings and aircraft

- Location within Georgia
- Former name: Southeastern Museum of Aviation
- Established: 1981
- Location: Robins Air Force Base, Georgia
- Coordinates: 32°35′24″N 83°35′16″W
- Type: Military aviation museum
- Director: Ken Emery
- Owner: United States Air Force
- Website: http://www.museumofaviation.org/

The Museum of Aviation is the second-largest aerospace museum of the United States Air Force. The museum is located just outside Warner Robins, Georgia (near Robins Air Force Base). As of July 2019, the museum included four exhibit buildings and more than 85 historic aircraft, among other exhibits, on its 51 acres (21 ha). The museum is also the home of Georgia Aviation Hall of Fame. Admission is free to nearly half-million visitors each year, which makes it the fourth-most-visited museum of the United States Department of Defense.

== History ==
The Museum of Aviation, originally the Southeastern Museum of Aviation, was founded in 1980, after World War I aviator Guy Orlando Stone offered his collection of aviation memorabilia to Robins Air Force Base under the condition that the base could build a museum to house it. The Air Force approved the museum in late 1980, and the Southeastern Museum of Aviation Foundation, a non-profit Organization, was incorporated in 1981 with the support of local civilians and base officials. Also in 1981, the Air Force Logistics Command, under General James P. Mullins, created its Heritage Program to preserve the history of Air Force logistics. The museum became a part of the base's contribution to the program.

The museum opened its first office in 1982 after the acquisition of another private collection. That same year, the Air Force approved the museum's ten-year plan, and fundraising efforts began to collect the $9.5 million in projected construction costs for a permanent museum facility. The museum's first airplane arrived in 1983; a total of twenty-seven airplanes were acquired over the course of the year. The museum officially opened to the public in November 1984 with twenty planes on display and twenty more being restored.

By 1988, the museum's name had changed to the Museum of Aviation at Robins.

In 1989, Georgia governor Joe Frank Harris signed legislation to create the Georgia Aviation Hall of Fame, to be housed at the museum. Among the original inductees included Stone, whose collections had helped launch the museum.

In the 1990s, museum facilities expanded with addition of the "Hangar One" exhibit space in a former aircraft hangar. In 1992, the museum dedicated its 60,000-square-foot "Phase II" facility, later named the Eagle Building, which housed a theater, a diorama, and more aircraft, among other exhibits. In 1996, the "Century of Flight Hangar" added an additional 60,000 square feet.

In 2013, the museum announced that thirty-two aircraft were to be removed from display. Some of these were relocated to other museums, while others were scrapped on-site.

In 2019, the museum unveiled a statue of Eugene Bullard, the first African-American pilot to fly in combat. Bullard, a native of Columbus, Georgia, served in the "Aéronautique Militaire", or French Air Force during World War I. He was posthumously commissioned as a second lieutenant in the U.S. Air Force in 1994.

A team disassembled a C-47 at the Museum of Alaska Transportation & Industry in preparation to move it to the museum in June 2024.

== Aircraft on display ==
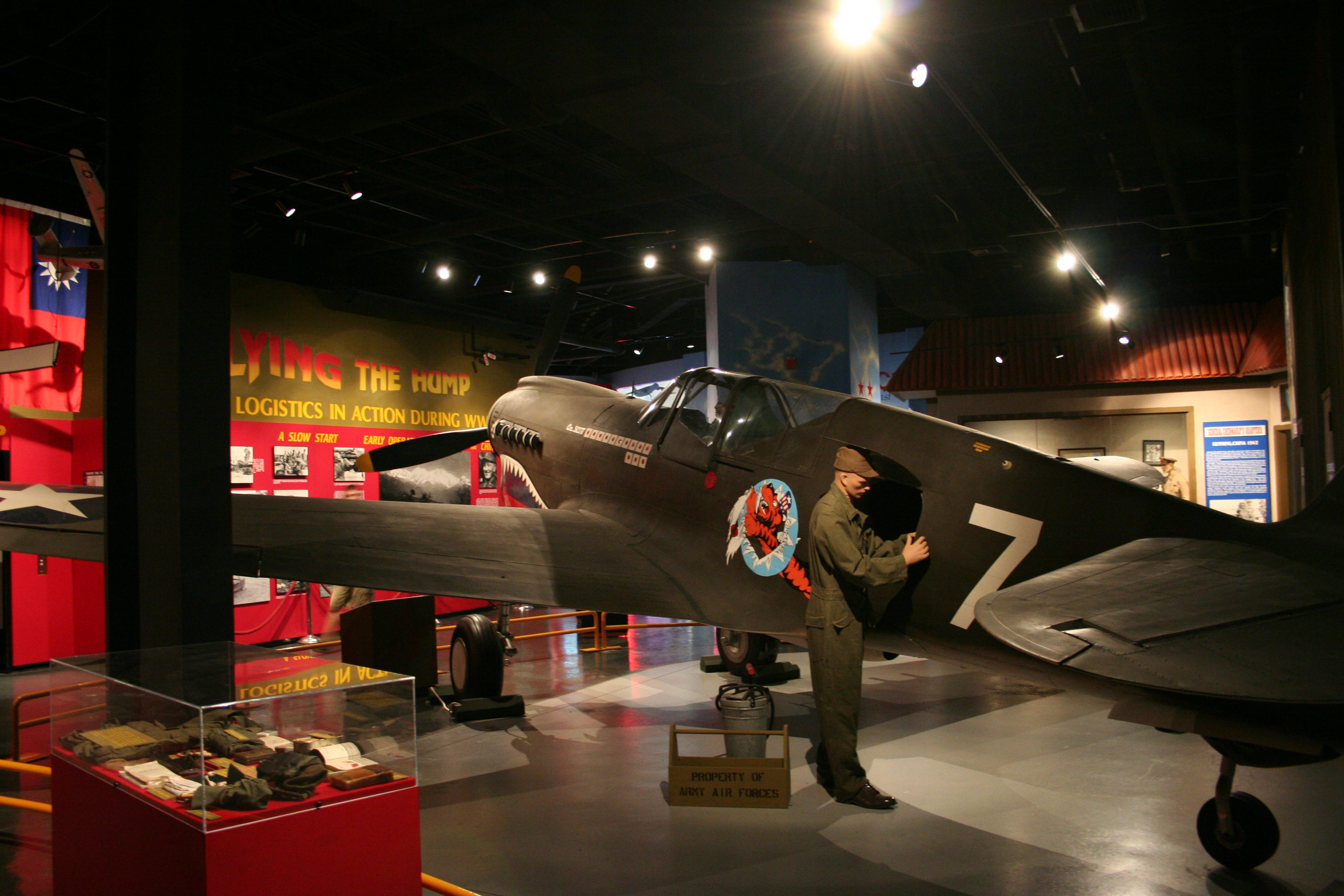
Curtiss P-40N Warhawk

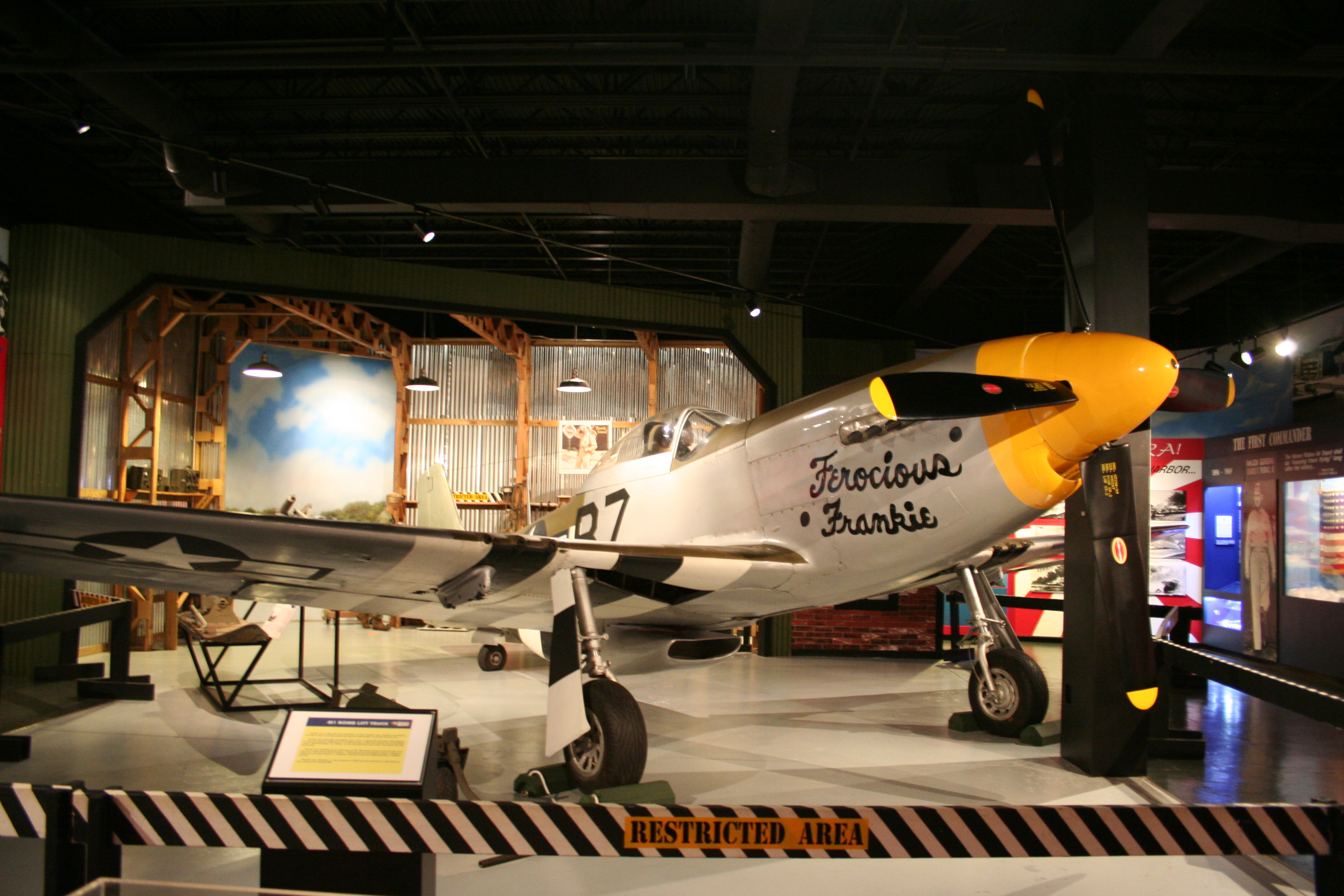
North American P-51D Mustang

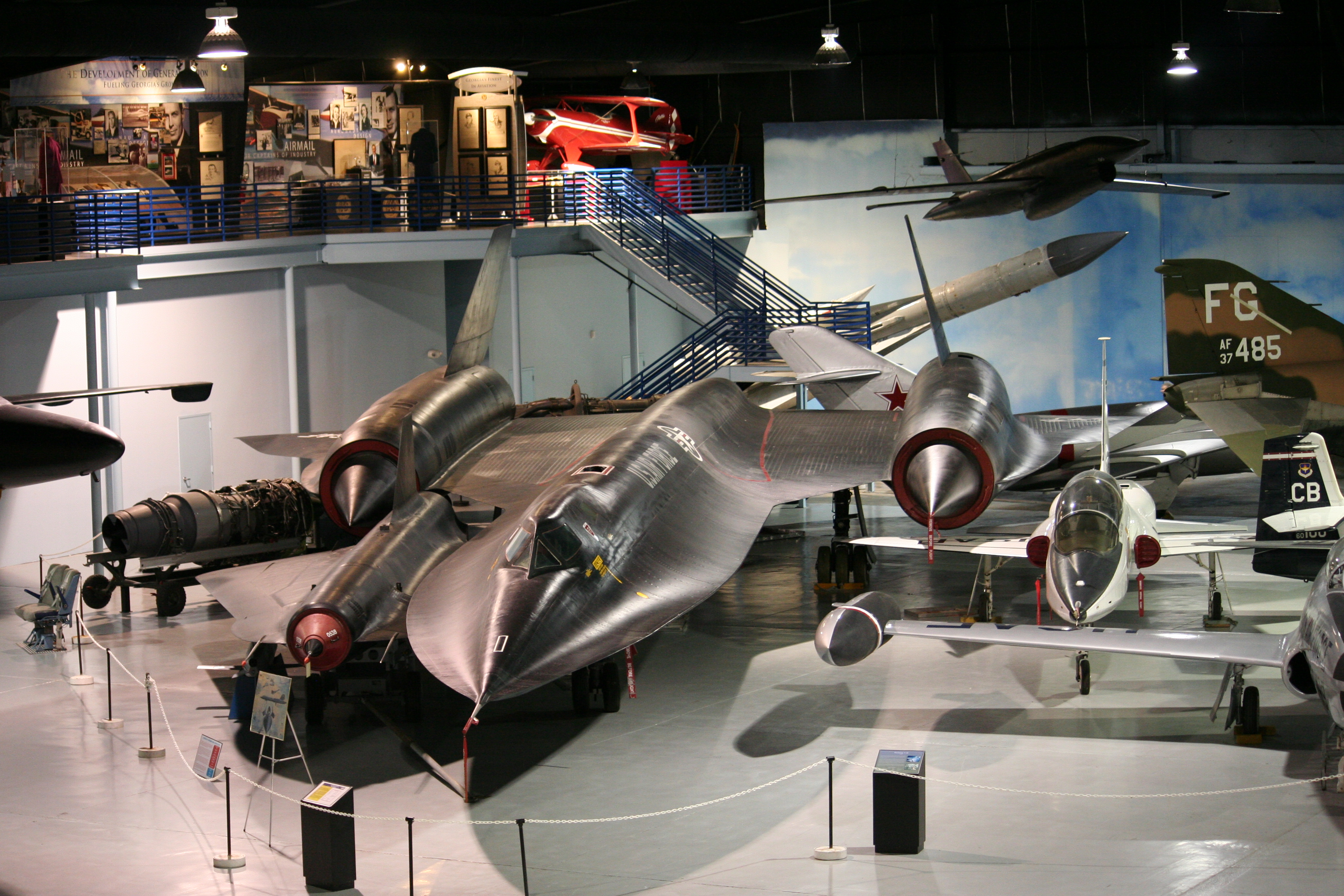
Lockheed SR-71 Blackbird

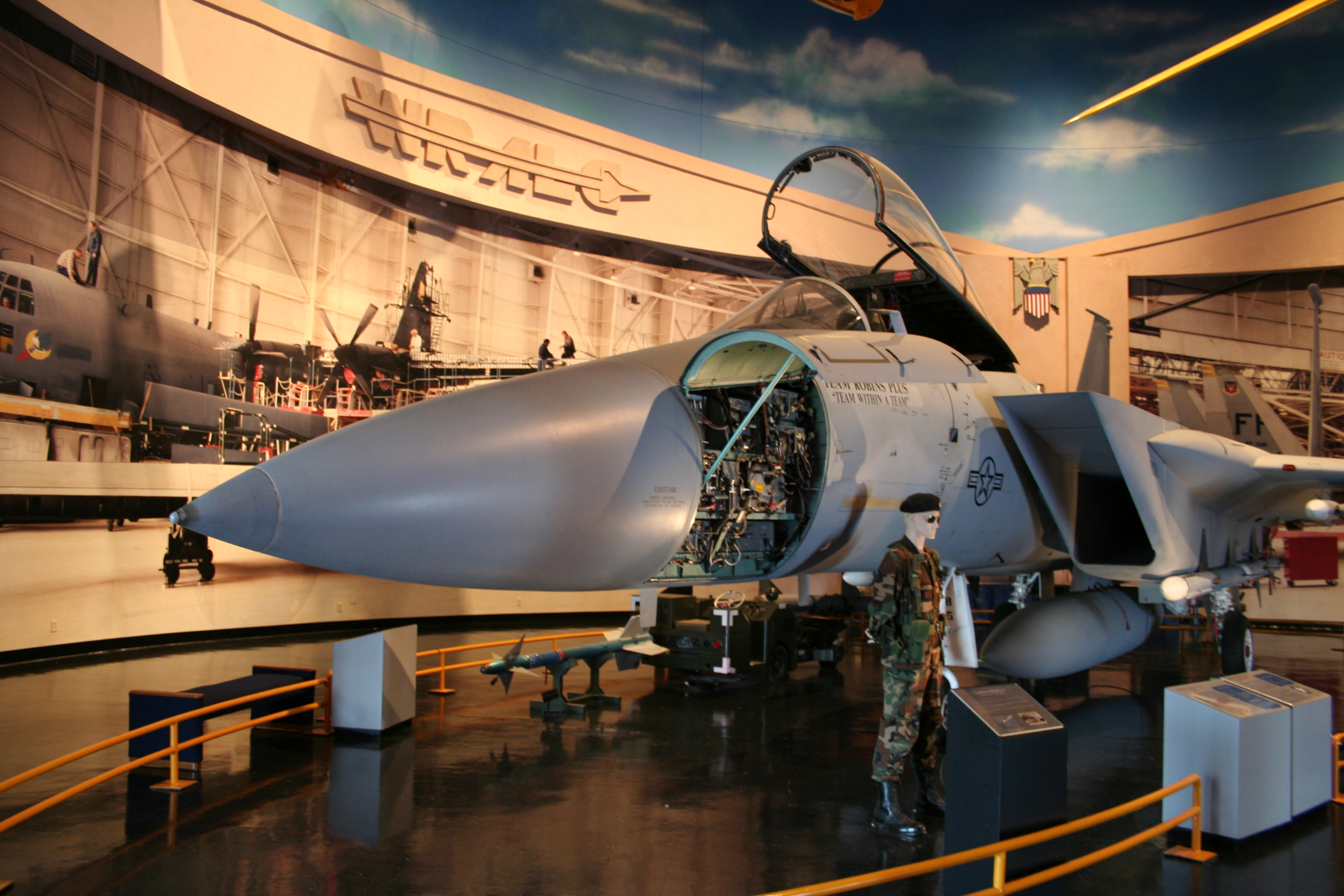
McDonnell Douglas F-15A Eagle

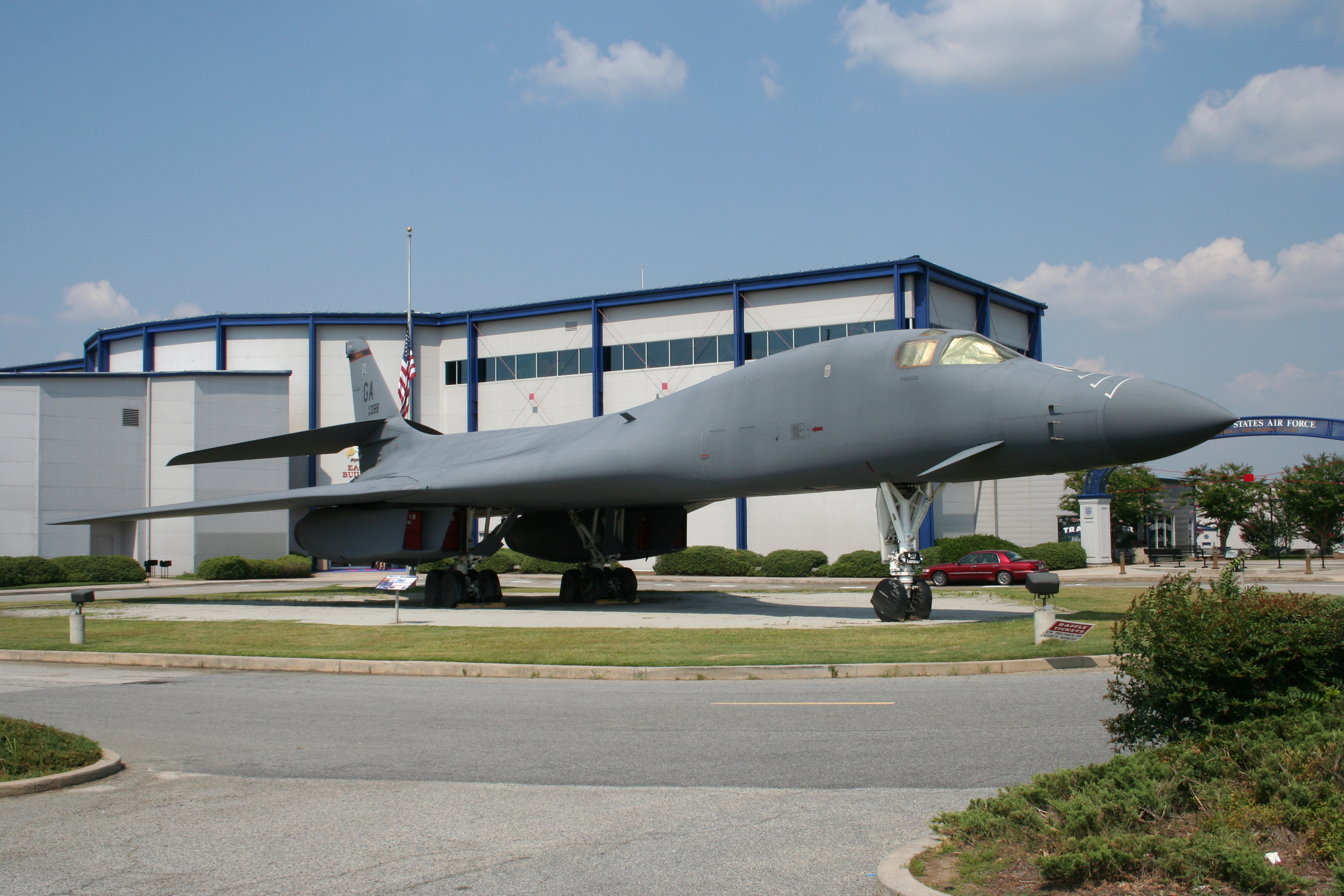
Rockwell B-1B Lancer

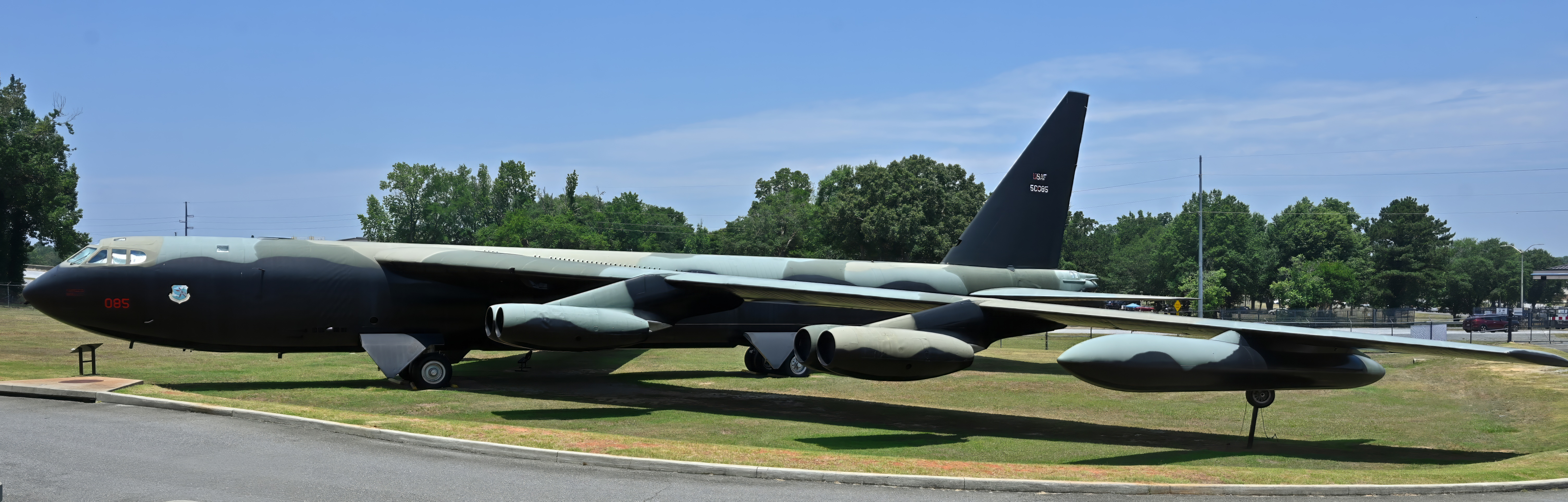
B-52D

=== Bombers ===
- Boeing B-17G Flying Fortress
- Boeing B-29B Superfortress
- Boeing B-52D Stratofortress
- Douglas VB-26B Invader
- Douglas WB-66D Destroyer
- Lockheed P-2H Neptune
- Martin B-57B Canberra
- Rockwell B-1B Lancer

=== Cargo aircraft ===
- Beechcraft C-45G Expeditor
- Boeing EC-135N
- Boeing KC-97L Stratofreighter
- Cessna UC-78 Bobcat
- Curtiss C-46D Commando
- de Havilland Canada C-7A Caribou
- Douglas C-47A Skytrain
- Douglas C-54G Skymaster
- Fairchild C-119C Flying Boxcar
- Fairchild UC-123K Provider
- Douglas C-124C Globemaster II
- Lockheed AC-130A Spectre
- Lockheed C-130E Hercules
- Lockheed C-141C Starlifter
- Lockheed EC-121K
- Lockheed VC-140B

=== Fighters ===
- Cessna A-37A Dragonfly
- Convair F-102A Delta Dagger
- Convair F-106A Delta Dart
- Curtiss P-40N Warhawk
- Fairchild Republic A-10A Thunderbolt II
- General Dynamics F-16A Fighting Falcon
- General Dynamics F-111E Aardvark
- Lockheed F-80C Shooting Star
- McDonnell F-101F Voodoo
- McDonnell Douglas F-4D Phantom II
- McDonnell Douglas F-15A Eagle
- McDonnell Douglas F-15A Eagle (gate guardian)
- McDonnell RF-101C Voodoo
- Mikoyan-Gurevich MiG-17
- Mikoyan-Gurevich MiG-21
- North American F-86H Sabre
- North American F-100D Super Sabre
- North American P-51H Mustang
- Northrop F-89J Scorpion
- Republic F-84E Thunderjet
- Republic F-105D Thunderchief

=== Helicopters ===
- Bell UH-1F Iroquois
- Bell UH-1P Iroquois
- Kaman HH-43A Huskie
- Sikorsky H-19D Chickasaw
- Sikorsky HH-3E
- Sikorsky MH-53M
- Vertol CH-21B Workhorse

=== Missiles and drones ===
- AIM-4D Falcon
- AIM-4E Falcon
- AIM-4F Falcon
- AIM-4G Falcon
- AIM-9L Sidewinder
- AIM-26A Falcon
- AIM-120 AMRAAM
- AIR-2A Genie
- AGM-28 Hound Dog
- AGM-88 HARM
- AGM-136A Tacit Rainbow
- AQM-34N Firebee
- AQM-34V Firebee II
- BQM-34A Firebee
- BQM-34F Firebee II
- Lockheed D-21
- MGM‐13A Mace
- MQM-107D Streaker
- Northrop Grumman RQ-4A Global Hawk
- TM-61A Matador
- YCGM-121B Seek Spinner

=== Trainers ===
- Boeing-Stearman PT-17 Kaydet
- Cessna T-37B Tweet
- Fairchild PT-19A
- Lockheed T-33A
- North American T-6G Texan
- North American T-28A Trojan
- North American T-39A Sabreliner
- Ryan PT-22 Recruit
- Vultee BT-13A Valiant

=== Special aircraft ===
The SR-71 Blackbird on display is the reigning airspeed record holder. Serial number 61-7958 set an absolute speed record of 1,905.81 knots (2,193.2 mph; 3,529.6 km/h) on July 28, 1976, which still stands.

- 1896 Chanute Glider
- Aeronca 7AC Champion
- Cessna O-1E Bird Dog
- Cessna O-2A Skymaster
- Cessna U-3B
- de Havilland Canada U-6A
- Epps 1912 Monoplane
- Grumman HU-16B Albatross
- Helio U-10D
- Laister-Kauffman TG-4A
- Lockheed SR-71A Blackbird
- Lockheed U-2D
- Rockwell OV-10 Bronco
- Stinson L-5E Sentinel

== Education center ==
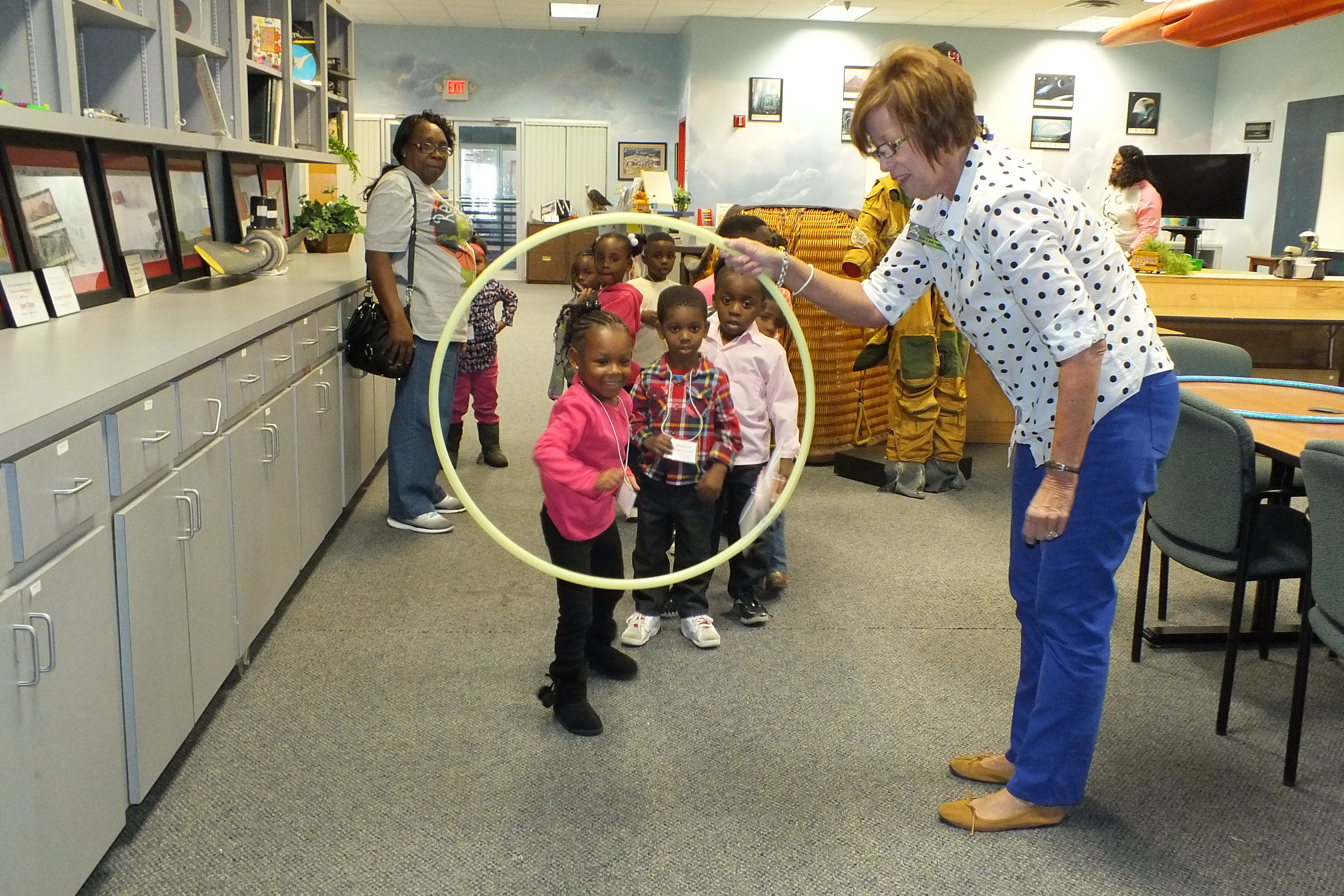
ACE field trip

The museum includes a non-profit education center called the National STEM Academy. The academy offers field trips and independent programs that integrate STEM disciplines with humanities subjects such as history and literature. These programs focus on career opportunities and workforce development. Activities, including field trips, workshops, and special events, are conducted at the Museum of Aviation, at school sites through outreach programs, and via live virtual field trips.

== See also ==
- List of aerospace museums
