= Epps 1910 Monoplane =

General information
- Type: General aviation
- National origin: United States
- Manufacturer: Epps
- Designer: Ben T. Epps

History
- First flight: 1910

The Epps 1910 Monoplane was designed and built in 1910 by Ben T. Epps from Athens, Georgia
