= Epps 1924 Monoplane =

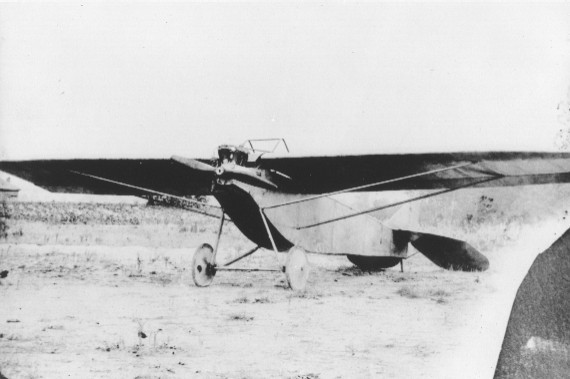

General information
- Type: General aviation
- National origin: United States
- Manufacturer: Epps
- Designer: Ben T. Epps
- Number built: 1

History
- First flight: 1924

The Epps 1924 Monoplane was designed and built in 1924 by Ben T. Epps from Athens, Georgia, United States. It weighed 350 pounds, and had a wingspan of 25 feet.
