= Good Conduct Medal =

Good Conduct Medal may refer to:

- Coast and Geodetic Survey Good Conduct Medal, a decoration of the United States Coast and Geodetic Survey
- Good Conduct Medal (Ireland), a military decoration of the Defence Forces of Ireland
- Good Conduct Medal (United States), a military decoration of the United States Armed Forces
- Good Conduct Medal (Vietnam), a military decoration of South Vietnam 1964–1974

== See also ==
- Reserve Good Conduct Medal, a military decoration of the United States Armed Forces
- Long Service and Good Conduct Medal, a similar decoration used in several Commonwealth states
