= Evektor EPOS =

Czech electric ultralight

EPOS

General information
- Type: Electric aircraft
- National origin: Czech Republic
- Manufacturer: Evektor-Aerotechnik
- Status: Under development (2015)

History
- Introduction date: 2013
- First flight: March 2013

The Evektor EPOS ("Electric powered small aircraft"), also called the SportStar EPOS, is a Czech electric ultralight and light-sport aircraft under development by Evektor-Aerotechnik of Kunovice. It was introduced at the AERO Friedrichshafen show in 2013.

The aircraft first flew at the end of March 2013.

== Design and development ==
The EPOS is based upon the Evektor SportStar RTC, a Fédération Aéronautique Internationale microlight and CS-LSA light-sport aircraft. It uses the RTC model's fuselage, mated to a new wing of longer span. It features a cantilever low-wing, an enclosed cockpit with two-seats-in-side-by-side configuration under a bubble canopy, fixed tricycle landing gear and a single electric motor in tractor configuration.

The aircraft is predominantly made from aluminum sheet. The initial electric motor employed was the Rotex RE X907 of 67 hp (50 kW) at 330 volts. In 2014 the design was upgraded with a Rotex RE BB 90-5, a brushless, DC, liquid-cooled powerplant that produces 100 hp (75 kW) at 3,000 rpm and weighs 20 kg (44 lb). It is controlled by a MGM Compro HBC-Series V7, 300400/EPOS1 controller with a maximum continuous current of 300 amperes and a maximum supply voltage of 400 volts. Power is supplied by 4 battery containers each with 45 Kokam Company, Ltd. SLPB100216216H cells of 40Ah capacity connected in series, producing 378 volts.

== Specifications (EPOS+) ==
Data from Tacke and manufacturer

General characteristics

- Crew: one
- Capacity: one passenger
- Length: 5.980 m (19 ft 7 in)
- Wingspan: 10.462 m (34 ft 4 in)
- Height: 2.476 m (8 ft 1 in)
- Empty weight: 285 kg (628 lb) without batteries, 316 kg (697 lbs) with four battery containers.
- Gross weight: 600 kg (1,323 lb)
- Fuel capacity: 7,200Ah (4 containers each with 45 cells of 40 Ah capacity)
- Powerplant: 1 × Rotex RE BB 90-5 brushless, DC, liquid cooled electric motor, 75 kW (101 hp)
- Propellers: 3-bladed VZLÚ model V332-3A1 composite, 1.625 m (5 ft 4 in) diameter

Performance

- Maximum speed: 260 km/h (160 mph, 140 kn)
- Cruise speed: 170 km/h (106 mph, 92 kn)
- Stall speed: 72 km/h (45 mph, 39 kn)
- Endurance: 1 hour with four battery containers, each with 45 cells
