= Mária Royová =

Mária Royová (26 November 1858 – 25 February 1924) was a Slovak Protestant activist, charity worker and songwriter.

She and her sister Kristína Royová founded the Blue Cross Organization and diaconal centre in Stará Turá.
