= Evektor EV-55 Outback =

Utility aircraft

EV-55 Outback
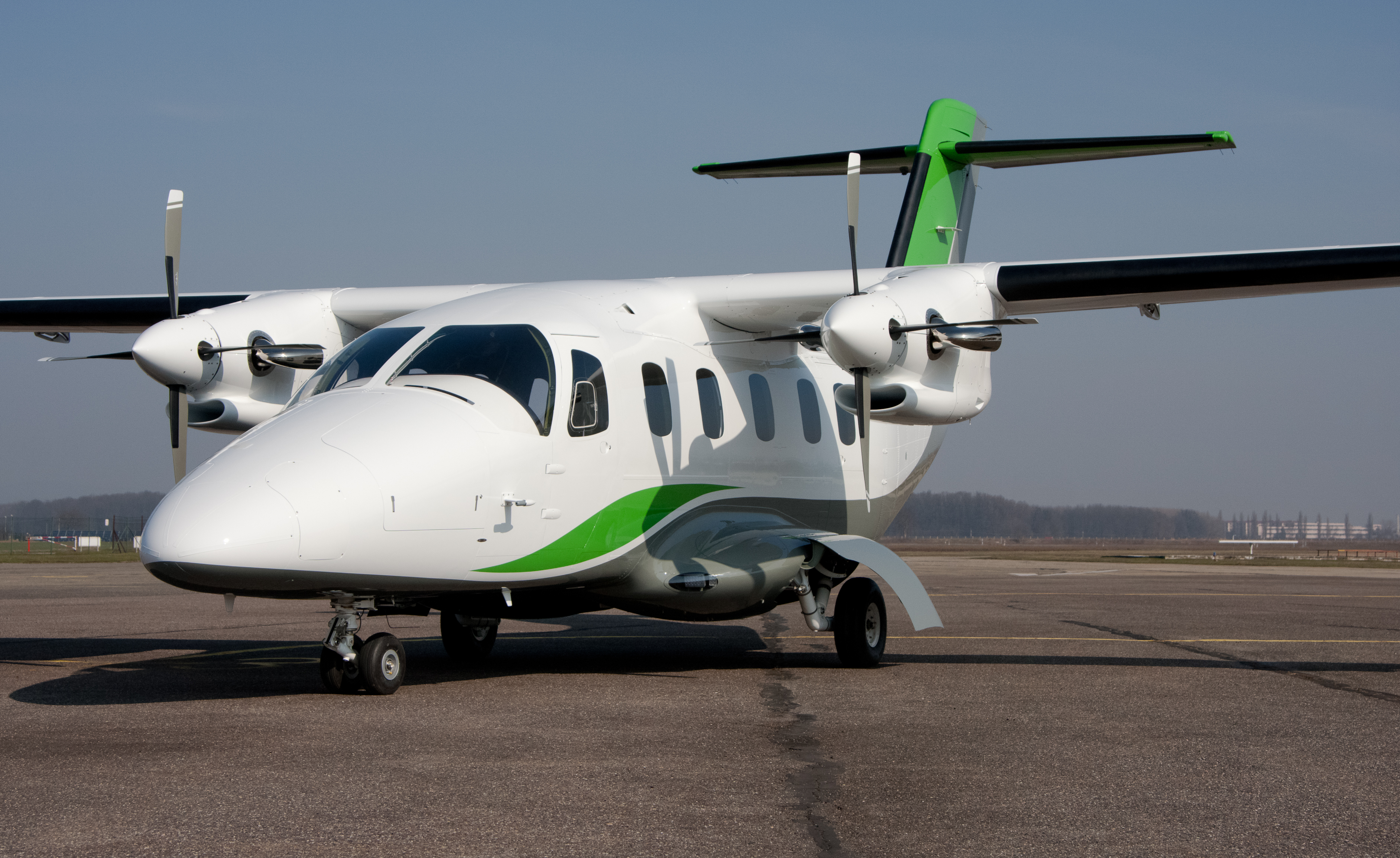
- EV-55 prototype (2011)

General information
- Type: Twin-engined utility aircraft
- National origin: Czech Republic
- Manufacturer: Evektor-Aerotechnik
- Status: Development suspended (March 2017)
- Number built: 2 + 1 for static testing

History
- First flight: 24 June 2011

The Evektor EV-55 Outback is a twin-engine turboprop aircraft designed and built in the Czech Republic by Evektor-Aerotechnik. The prototype first flew on 24 June 2011. The project's development was suspended in March 2017.

== Development ==
In 2004, the company announced its plan to design and construct a two-engined utility aircraft that would carry up to 14 passengers or 4000 lb (1800 kg) of cargo, and operate from unimproved fields and at high-altitude airports.

The first prototype, an EV-55M (military version), flew from Kunovice Airport in June 2011, with company pilot Josef Charvat and military pilot Maj. Jiri Hana at the controls. It was estimated at $2.1 to $2.2 million in 2012. The first production-conforming aircraft flew from Kunovice in April 2016.

In June 2018, its price was $4 million and two aircraft should finish development flights with 200 hours in 2016, for 500 total hours. Evektor secured enough investment to complete the certification process scheduled for 2017, with a minority investment from a Malaysian company backed by the country's former premier Mahathir Mohamad, but not to begin full production.

The project's development was suspended on 16 March 2017 due to "some uncertainties" with Evektor's Malaysian investor.

By December 2018, it was touted as a basis for an EVE-55 hybrid electric aircraft conversion to fly in 2020, with only one PT6A-21 running a 400 kW (540 hp) generator in the rear compartment, for much lower noise, an 18% fuel saving and the same payload and performance: a 3 hours endurance and 40 minutes from electric power only.

== Design ==
The EV-55 is of conventional high-wing utility design with a T-tail. The prototype aircraft is powered by Pratt & Whitney PT6A-21 turboprop engines (535 shaft horsepower), driving four-blade propellers. The wing is mounted atop a nearly-square fuselage, which has five windows per side. The trailing-link tricycle landing gear retracts into the nose section or pods on the lower fuselage. Expected maximum cruise speed is 220 knots (407 km/h).

With nine passengers, range is 800nm (1,480km), it can take-off in 410m and land in 520m and with more speed, range and short take-off and landing capability, it can replace ageing piston-twins like the Cessna 421 and Britten-Norman Islander, or the smaller Cessna Caravan single turboprop when the payload-range of a larger turboprop such as the L-410 or Viking Twin Otter is not needed. The less expensive, unpressurised EV-55 won't compete with the Pilatus PC-12 or Beechcraft King Air.

The 5.02m x 1.61m cabin standard layout is five and four seats with a cargo compartment separated by a semi bulkhead and a L-410 sized double door at the rear. It is equipped with a full glass cockpit, Czech firm Avia makes the four-blade propellers and Aero Vodochody the landing gear.

== Specifications (EV-55) ==
Data from Evektor.

General characteristics

- Crew: 2
- Capacity: 1 776 kg / 3 915 lb payload, 9 pax (14 if regulation allowed)
- Length: 14.35 m (47 ft 1 in)
- Wingspan: 16.10 m (52.82 ft)
- Height: 4.66 m (15.28 ft)
- Empty weight: 2,597 kg (5,725 lb) , cargo, passengers: 2,658kg / 5,860lb
- Max takeoff weight: 4,600 kg (10,141 lb)
- Fuel capacity: 1,656 kg (3,651 lb)
- Powerplant: 2 × Pratt & Whitney Canada PT6A-21 turboprop, 399 kW (535 hp) each
- Propellers: 4-bladed AVIA AV-844, 2.082 m (6 ft 10 in) diameter constant speed

Performance

- Maximum speed: 410 km/h (250 mph, 220 kn) at 10,000 ft
- Stall speed: 119 km/h (74 mph, 64 kn) with flaps, 77 kn without
- Range: 1,713 km (1,064 mi, 925 nmi) , 2,000 lb (907 kg) payload

== See also ==
Aircraft of comparable role, configuration, and era

- CASA C-212 Aviocar
- De Havilland Canada DHC-6 Twin Otter
- Dornier 228
- Let L-410 Turbolet
- Tecnam P2012 Traveller
- PZL M28 Skytruck
