= SuperCobra =

SuperCobra can refer to:

- Bell AH-1 SuperCobra, American helicopter gunship
- Evektor VUT100 SuperCobra, Czech light aircraft
