= Modrý kríž =

Modrý kríž (Slovak for Blue Cross) was a society of teetotalers (abstainers from alcohol) originating in Stará Turá, Slovakia at the end of the 19th century and the beginning of the 20th. It was founded by sisters Kristína Royová and Mária Royová and initiated a movement in the spiritual, cultural and social life of the mainly peasant people of the surrounding region who traditionally belonged to the Lutheran Church.

They have been said to act as a sect, with leaders managing the lives of the members

== See also ==
- Charismatic Movement
- International Federation of the Blue Cross
