= Anton Gala =

Slovakian university professor and ophthalmologist (1891-1977)

Anton Gala (12 March 1891, Kunovice, Moravia – 29 August 1977, Bratislava) was a Slovak university professor and scientist specializing in ophthalmology.

Gala graduated from secondary school at Uherské Hradiště in 1910, then studied medicine at the Charles University in Prague, graduating in 1916. During World War I he served on a hospital ship. From 1919 to 1961 he worked at the faculty of medicine of Comenius University in Bratislava; from 1931 as professor, in 1937/38 as dean of the faculty.
