= Kunovice Airport =

Airport in the Czech Republic

Kunovice Airport Letiště Kunovice
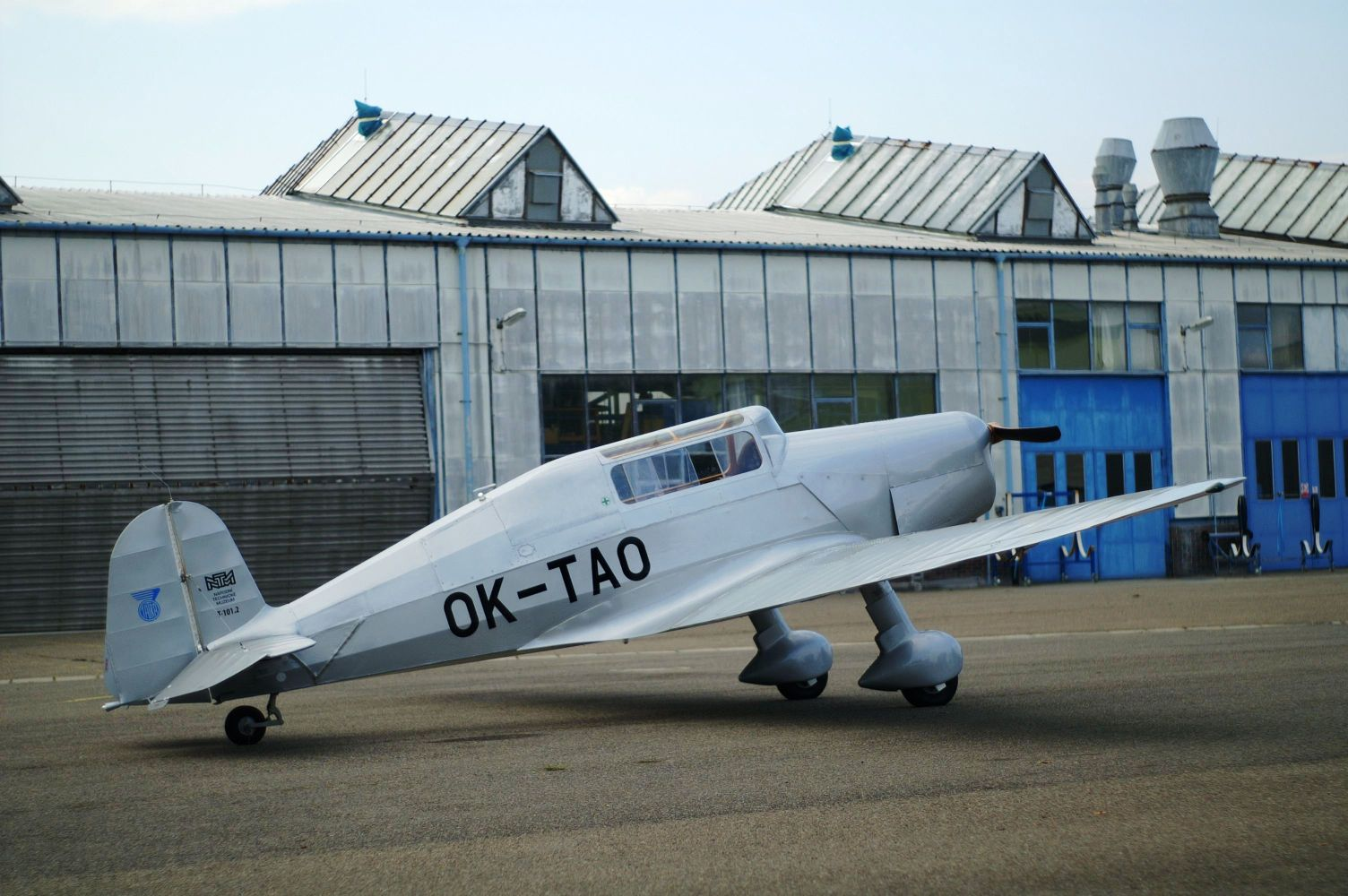
- IATA: UHE; ICAO: LKKU

Summary
- Airport type: Non-public
- Serves: Uherské Hradiště
- Location: Kunovice
- Opened: 1937
- Elevation AMSL: 581 ft / 177 m
- Coordinates: 49°01′46″N 17°26′23″E
- Website: let.cz/en/airport.php
- Interactive map of Kunovice Airport

Runways
Direction	Length		Surface
Direction	ft	m	Surface
02L/20R	4,856	1,480	Grass
02C/20C	6,562	2,000	Concrete
02R/20L	5,545	1,690	Grass

Kunovice Airport (Czech: Letiště Kunovice) (IATA: UHE, ICAO: LKKU) is an airport in Kunovice, about 5 km (3 mi) from Uherské Hradiště, Czech Republic. It is a non-public international airport and has no scheduled flights.

The airport is associated with the local aerospace industry. Aircraft Industries operates from Kunovice Airport, and manufacturers in Kunovice include Czech Sport Aircraft and Evektor-Aerotechnik.

== See also ==
- List of airports in the Czech Republic
