= Evektor-Aerotechnik =

Aircraft manufacturer based in the Czech Republic

- Company type: Privately held company
- Industry: Aerospace
- Founded: 1970
- Headquarters: Kunovice, Czech Republic
- Products: Light aircraft
- Revenue: 193,978,000 Czech koruna (2020)
- Operating income: 30,768,000 Czech koruna (2020)
- Net income: 24,051,000 Czech koruna (2020)
- Total assets: 141,518,000 Czech koruna (2020)
- Number of employees: 102 (2020)
- Website: www.evektoraircraft.com

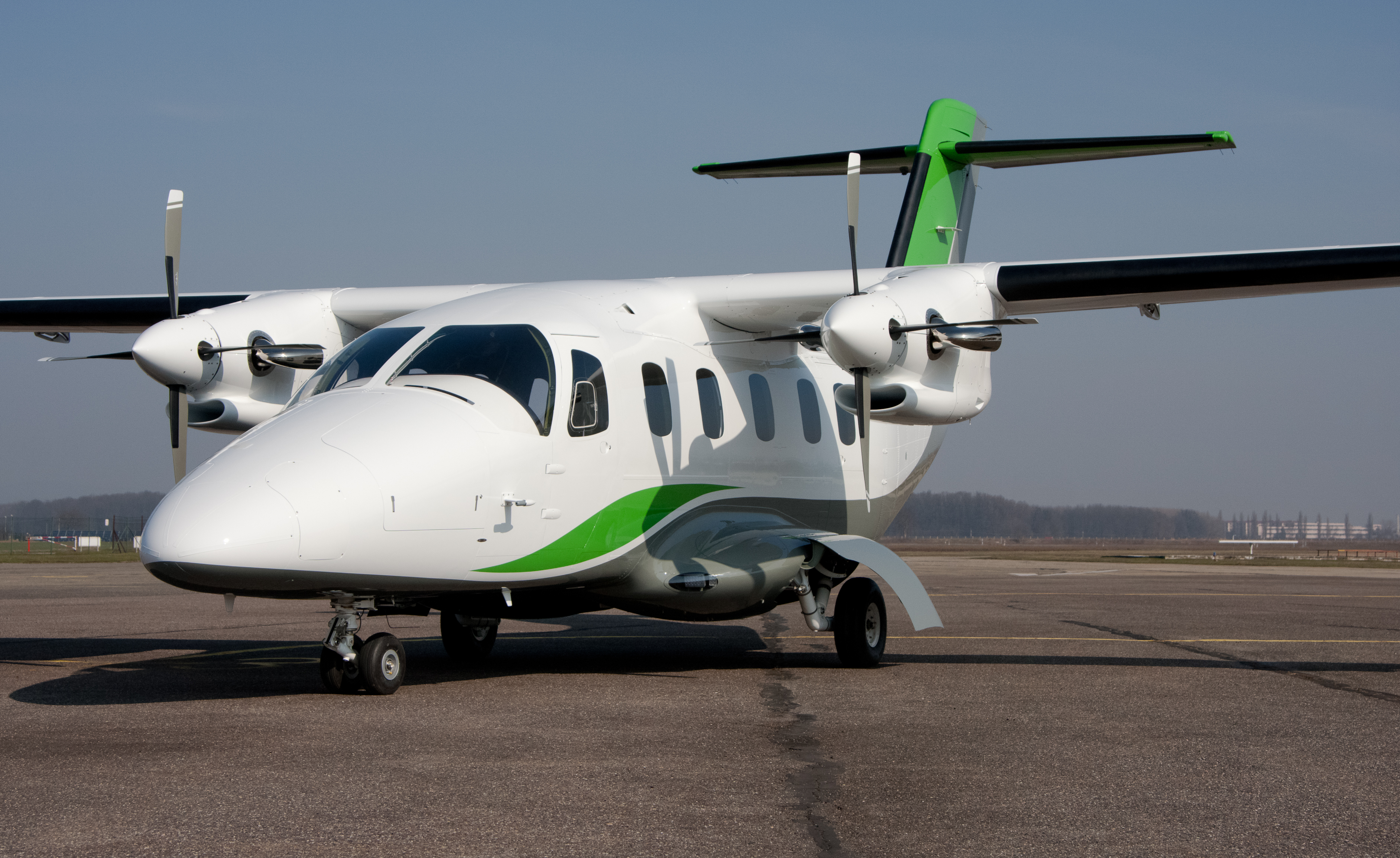
Evektor EV-55 Outback

Evektor-Aerotechnik is a Czech aircraft manufacturer based in Kunovice, Czech Republic. The company produces a range of light sport aircraft, training, advanced ultralight aircraft and electric aircraft.

Evektor-Aerotechnik is also developing a 9–14 passenger, twin engine turboprop airplane, the EV-55 Outback.

== History ==
Evektor-Aerotechnik is based at Kunovice Airport, a region known for its aircraft industry since 1936. Evektor-Aerotechnik dates back to 1970 when Aerotechnik was established as a producer of small general aviation airplanes. Its first aircraft were gyrocopters and motor gliders, later diversifying into the overhaul and maintenance of a range of Czech general aviation aircraft, including the Zlin aircraft family.

The production of light sport aircraft and advanced ultralight aircraft started in 1996, starting with the P220UL Koala aircraft and followed by the EV-97 Eurostar (introduced in 1997) and SportStar. The SportStar became the first light sport aircraft accepted by the American Federal Aviation Administration in 2004. During 1997–2004 Evektor-Aerotechnik was an airframe parts subcontractor for the single engine turboprop Aero Ae 270 Ibis. In 2004 the company introduced the single engine, four-seater VUT100 Cobra and in 2010 started the twin engine turboprop Evektor EV-55 Outback. which was first flown in 2011.

In 2013 the company introduced the Evektor EPOS, an electric aircraft that remained under development in 2017.

== Aircraft ==
- Aerotechnik A-70 Autogyro
- Aerotechnik L-13, LET L-13 Blaník built by Aerotechnik
- Evektor SportStar family of designs
- Evektor VUT100 Cobra
- Evektor EV-55 Outback
- Evektor EPOS electric aircraft

== See also ==
- Light aircraft manufacturers in the Czech Republic
