= Secondary Industrial School in Stará Turá, Slovakia =

Coordinates: 48.7807°N 17.6831°E

Secondary Industrial School in Stará Turá Stredná priemyselná škola Stará Turá
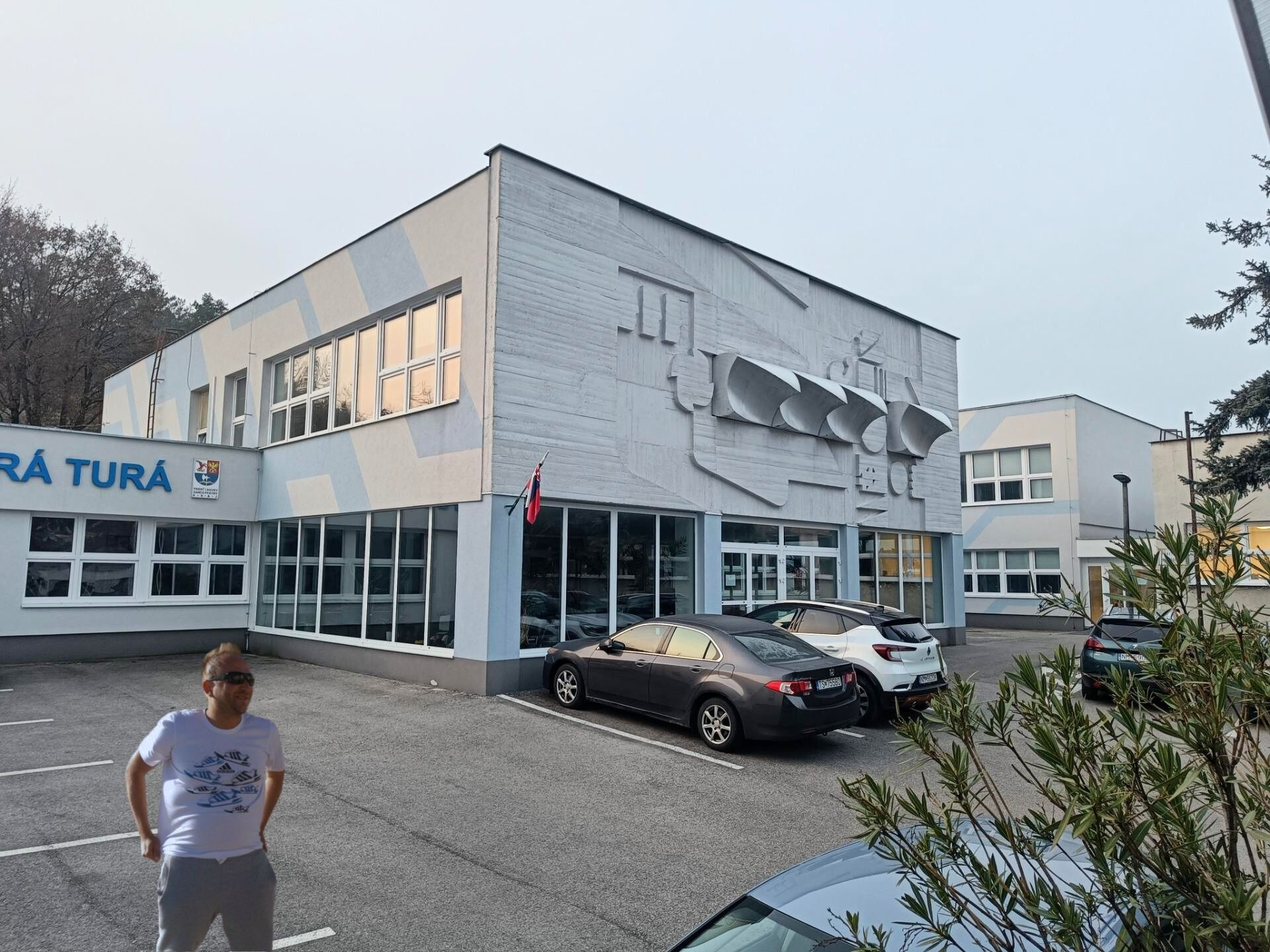
- School building in October 2023

Address
- Športová 675; 916 01 Stará Turá; Slovakia

Information
- Type: Secondary industrial school
- Established: 2003 (ZSŠE); 2008 (SOŠ); 2023 (SPŠ)
- Founder: Trenčín Region
- Principal: Ing. Milan Duroška
- Staff: 30 teachers, 6 masters
- Website: www.sosst.sk/zsse www.sosst.edupage.sk

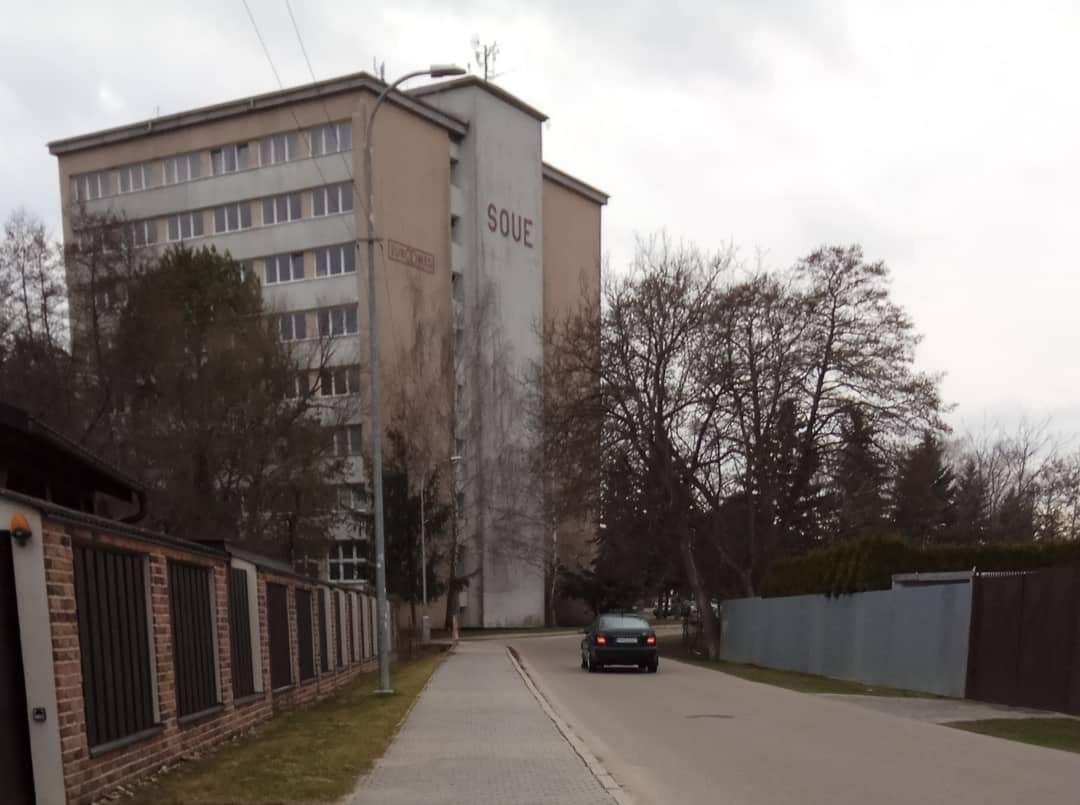
Principal office and dormitory building in 2019

Secondary Industrial School in Stará Turá (Slovak: Stredná priemyselná škola Stará Turá), until 1 September 2023 known as Secondary Professional School in Stará Turá (Slovak: Stredná odborná škola Stará Turá), is a secondary school in Stará Turá, Slovakia. Established on 1 September 2003 merging Secondary Industrial School of Electrical Engineering (Slovak: Stredná priemyselná škola elektrotechnická) and Secondary Vocational School of Electrical Engineering (Slovak: Stredné odborné učilište elektrotechnické) as Associated Secondary School of Electrical Engineering (Slovak: Združená stredná škola elektrotechnická) and on 1 September 2008 was renamed to Secondary Professional School. In 2018 it underwent reconstruction of the exterior facade and dining room, and was added a new rest area for school pupils. In December 2019 was finished reconstruction of the main part of the school gym and dressing rooms.

== Fields of study ==
=== Fields of study of the secondary vocational school education ===
- Mechanic adjuster
- Computer network technician
- Mechanic electro technician
- Digital media Graphic Designer
- Intelligent and digital system administrator

=== Fields of study of the secondary industrial school education ===
- Information & networking technologies
- Electrical engineering

== Apprenticeship fields of study ==
- Electro mechanical
- Metal worker
