= Aerotechnik A-70 =

Czechoslovak rotor kite

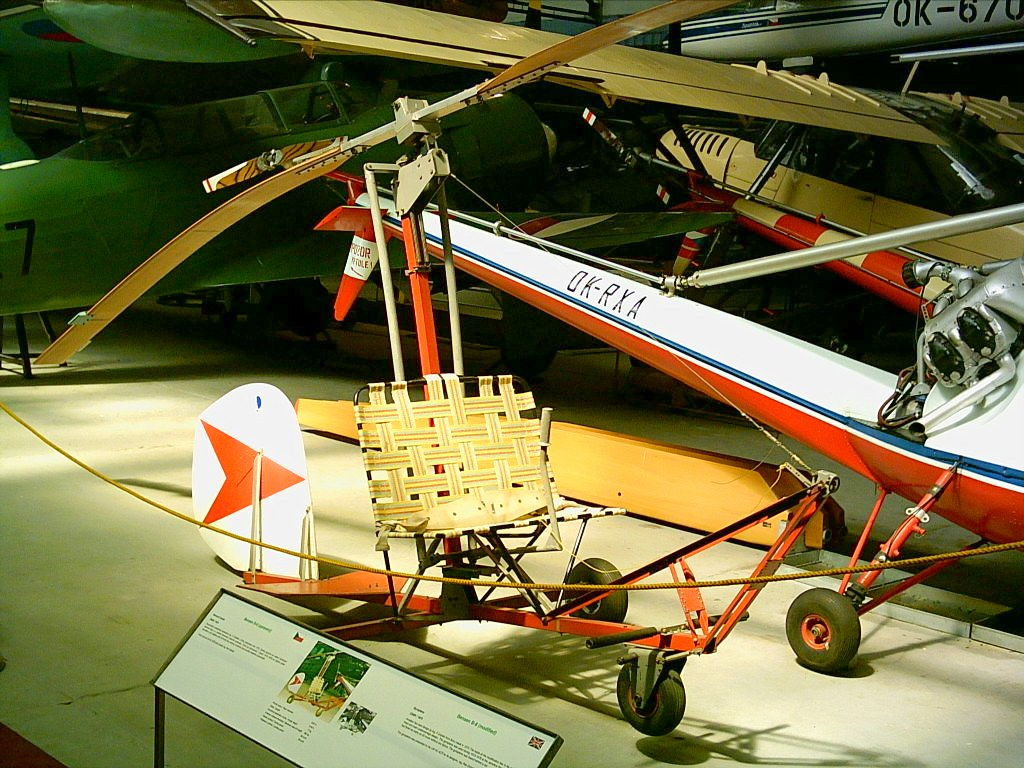
- A-70 rotor kite in the Prague Aviation Museum, Kbely (foreground)

General information
- Type: Rotor kite
- National origin: Czechoslovakia
- Manufacturer: Aerotechnik, now Evektor-Aerotechnik

History
- Introduction date: 1970
- First flight: 1970

The A-70 is a rotor kite that was sold by Aerotechnik.

== Design and development ==
The A-70 was the first product of Aerotechnik, later merged and renamed Evektor-Aerotechnik. The A-70 was a towed rotor kite. The two seat variant placed seats in front of and behind the rotor mast.

== Variants ==
Single seat and two seat variants were constructed.

== Specifications Aerotechnik A-70 ==
General characteristics

- Capacity: 2
