= Evektor VUT100 Cobra =

Czech light aircraft

VUT100 Cobra
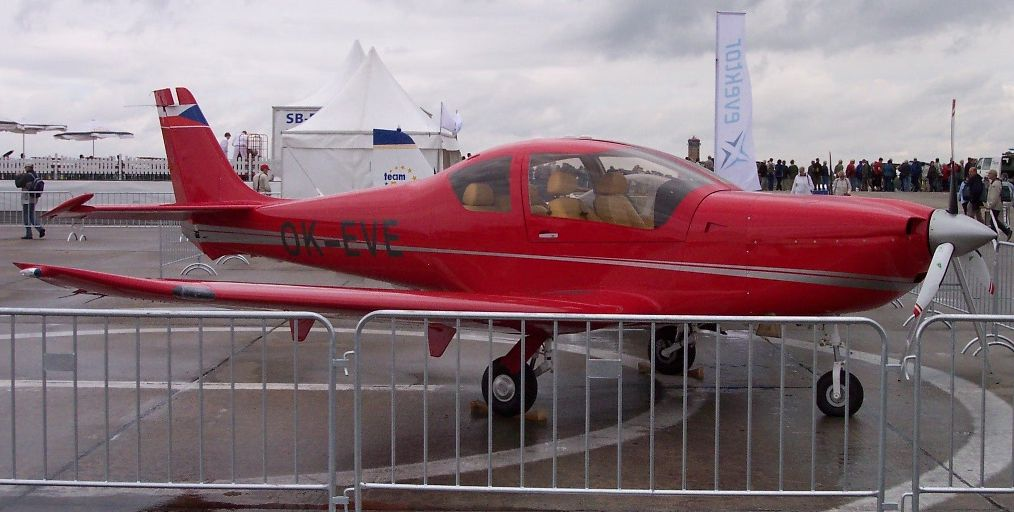

General information
- Type: Light aircraft
- National origin: Czech Republic
- Manufacturer: Evektor-Aerotechnik
- Status: Under development (2017)

The Evektor VUT100 Cobra (also called the VUT 100 and VUT-100) is a Czech light aircraft under development by Evektor-Aerotechnik, of Kunovice. The aircraft is intended to be supplied as a complete ready-to-fly-aircraft.

As of 2017 the manufacturer lists the aircraft as "in development".

== Design and development ==
Around 1990, Czech company Moravan Otrokovice started a project to modernise its Zlín Z 42/Z 43 family of light aircraft. The redesign proved so complete that the company treated it as a new project with the designation Z 90 and displayed a mockup of it at the 1991 Paris Air Show. However, market conditions at the time were unfavourable, and work on the Z 90 halted without the aircraft entering production. Some work that had been done on the Z 90 was used in the Kappa 77 KP 2U-SOVA ultralight design, which allowed aspects of the design to be proven in practice.

By 2001, the market for general aviation aircraft had recovered sufficiently for the Czech Ministry of Industry and Trade to sponsor a new project to continue development of the Z 90 under the name VUT100. This project would be a collaboration between different Czech aviation manufacturing companies and the Institute of Aerospace Engineering at the Brno University of Technology.

The aircraft features a cantilever low-wing, a four-seat enclosed cabin, retractable tricycle landing gear and a single engine in tractor configuration.

The VUT100 is a hybrid construction of metallic and composite materials. Its 10.2 m (33.5 ft) span wing has an area of 13.11 m^{2} (141.1 sq ft) and mounts flaps. The engines fitted vary, depending on the model and the cabin is 1.22 m (48 in) in width. The VUT100 is stressed for +3.8/-1.52g in the normal category and +4.4/-1.76g in the utility category.

Although designed to European CS-23 and American FAR-23 certification standards, the VUT100 does not currently have a type certificate issued by the European Aviation Safety Agency or the Federal Aviation Administration.

== Variants ==
Zlín Z 90
Original design from 1990; not built
Evektor VUT100-120i Cobra
Base model with a 200 hp (149 kW) Lycoming IO-360-A1B6 four-stroke powerplant, an empty weight of 830 kg (1,830 lb) and a gross weight of 1,330 kg (2,930 lb), giving a useful load of 500 kg (1,100 lb).
Evektor VUT100-131i SuperCobra
Higher powered model with a 315 hp (235 kW) Lycoming IO-580-B1A four-stroke powerplant, an empty weight of 880 kg (1,940 lb) and a gross weight of 1,450 kg (3,200 lb), giving a useful load of 570 kg (1,260 lb).

== Specifications (VUT100-131i SuperCobra) ==
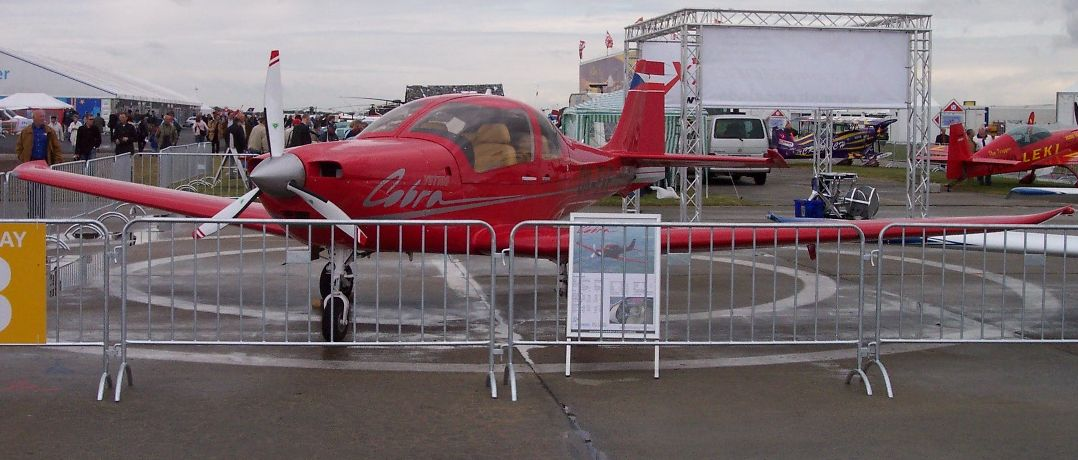
Evektor VUT100 Cobra

Data from Bayerl and Evektor

General characteristics

- Crew: one
- Capacity: three passengers
- Length: 8.0 m (26 ft 3 in)
- Wingspan: 10.2 m (33 ft 6 in)
- Wing area: 13.11 m^{2} (141.1 sq ft)
- Empty weight: 880 kg (1,940 lb)
- Gross weight: 1,450 kg (3,197 lb)
- Fuel capacity: 340 litres (75 imp gal; 90 US gal)
- Powerplant: 1 × Lycoming IO-580-B1A six cylinder, air-cooled, four stroke aircraft engine, 235 kW (315 hp)
- Propellers: 3-bladed Hartzell Propeller HC-F3YR-1RF constant speed, 1.93 m (6 ft 4 in) diameter

Performance

- Maximum speed: 324 km/h (201 mph, 175 kn)
- Stall speed: 103 km/h (64 mph, 56 kn)
- Never exceed speed: 375 km/h (233 mph, 202 kn)
- Range: 1,830 km (1,140 mi, 990 nmi)
- Endurance: 6 hours
- g limits: +3.8/-1.52g (normal category), +4.4/-1.76g (utility category)
- Rate of climb: 7.6 m/s (1,500 ft/min)
- Wing loading: 110.6 kg/m^{2} (22.7 lb/sq ft)
