= Evektor SportStar =

Czech light sport aircraft

SportStar
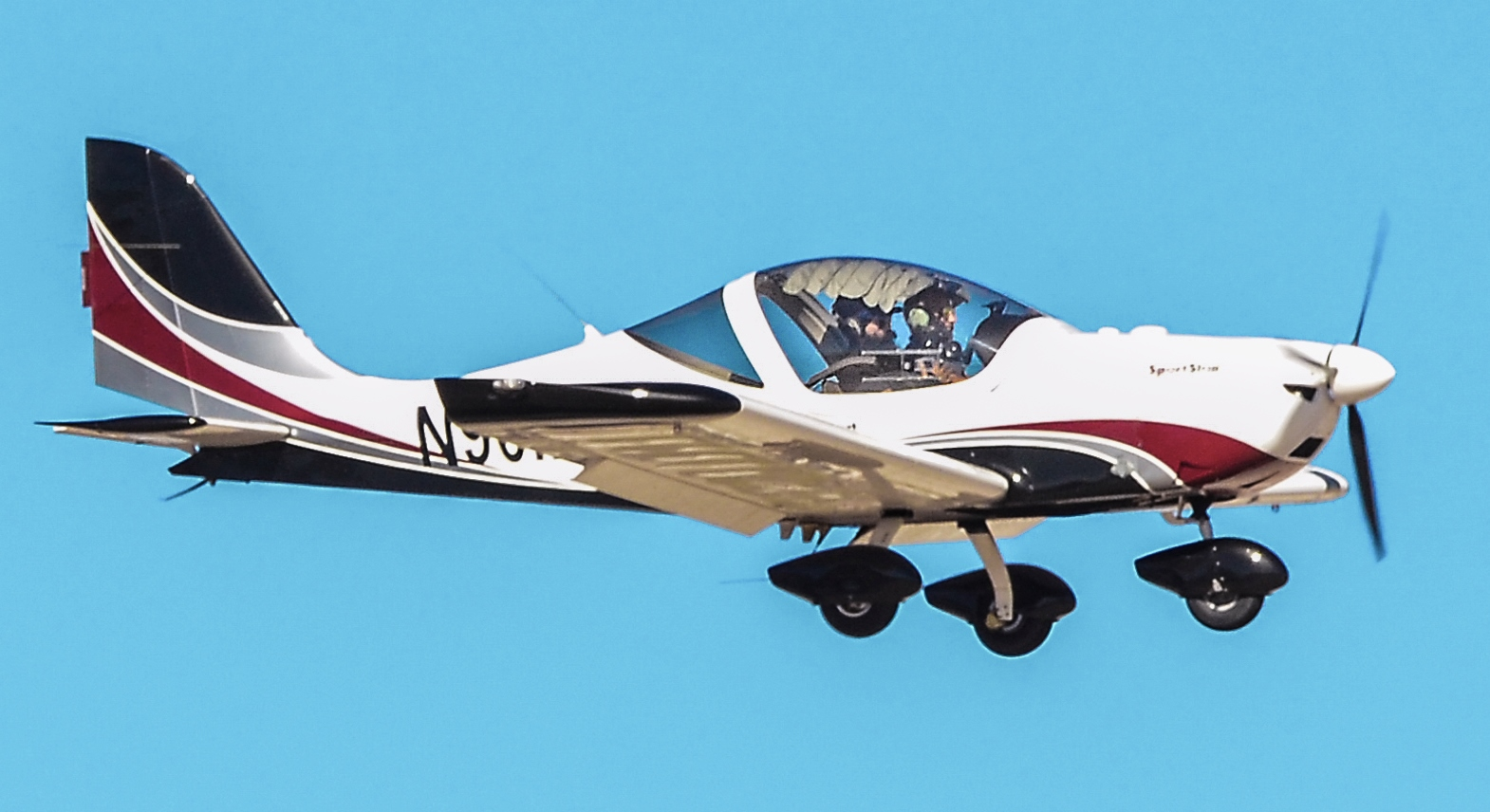
- SportStar

General information
- Type: Light Sport Aircraft
- National origin: Czech Republic
- Manufacturer: Evektor-Aerotechnik
- Status: In production

History
- Manufactured: 1997–present
- Variant: Evektor EPOS

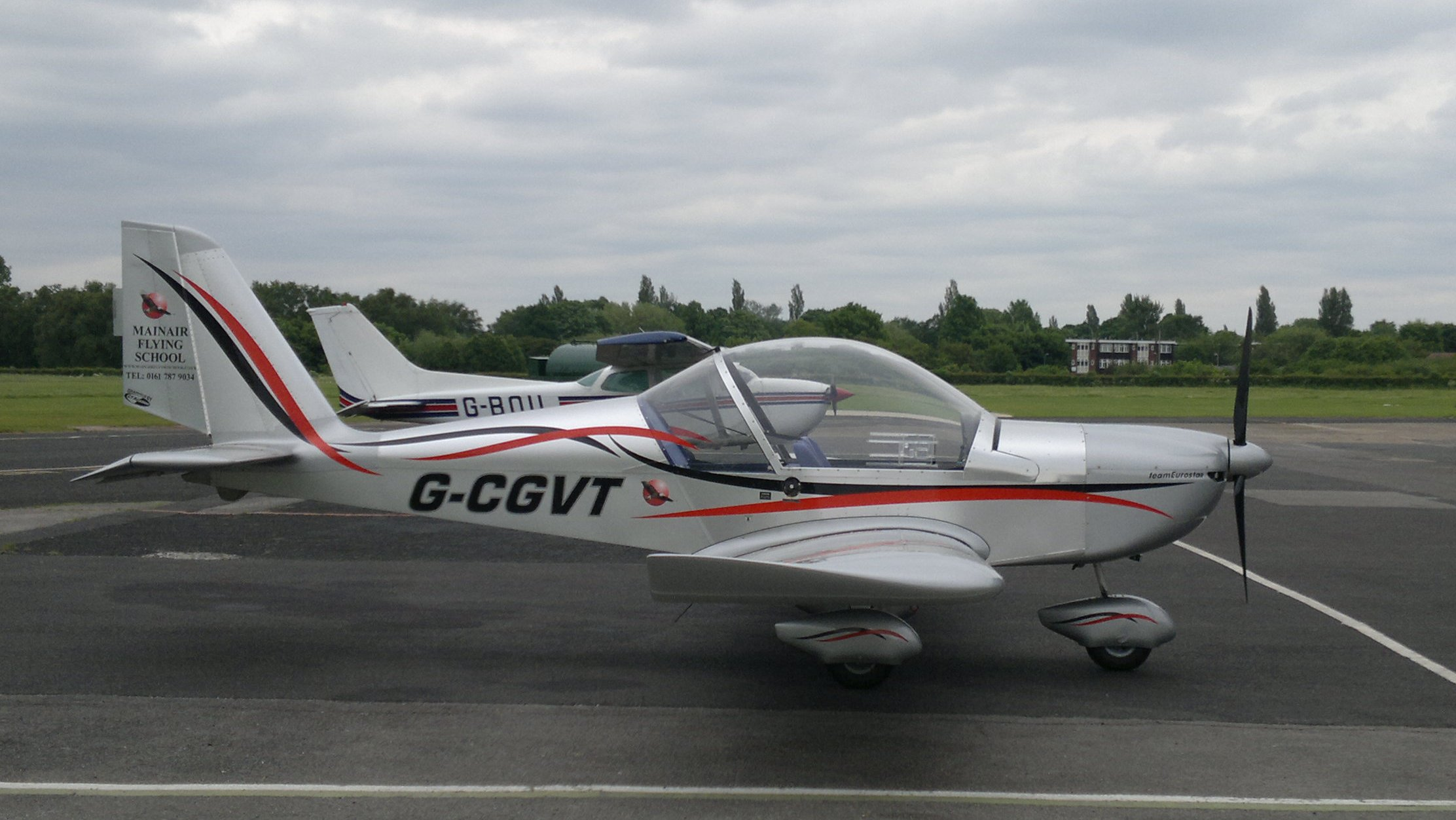
Eurostar EV-97

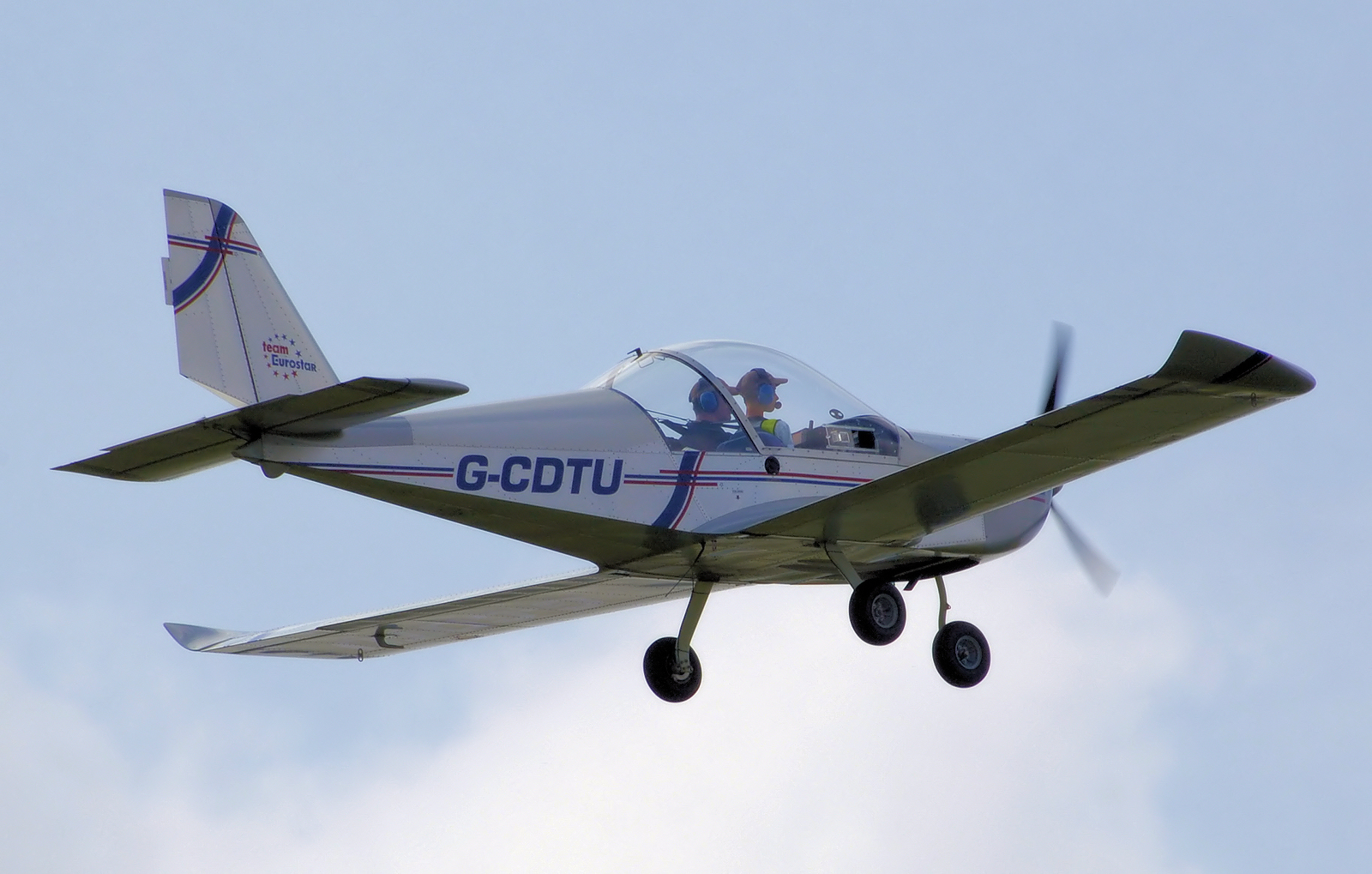
Eurostar EV-97 in flight

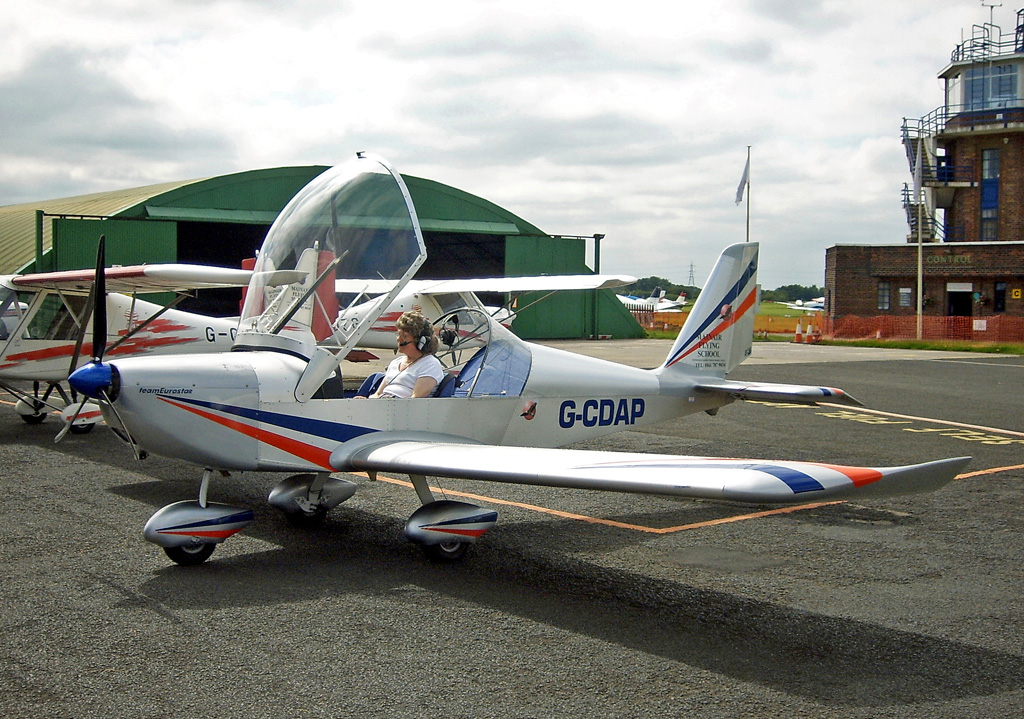
EV-97 Eurostar showing the large hinged clear view cockpit canopy

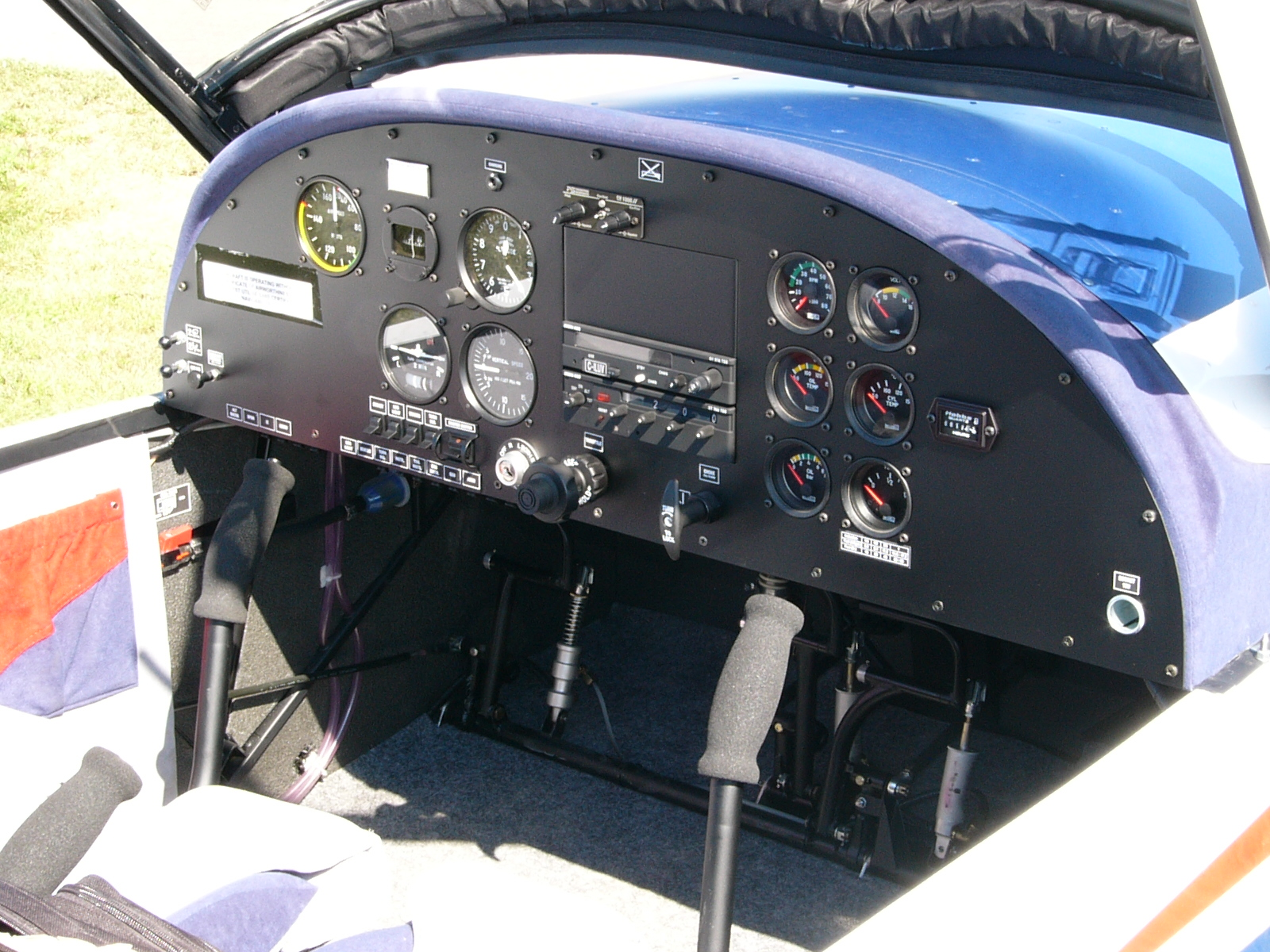
SportStar instrument panel

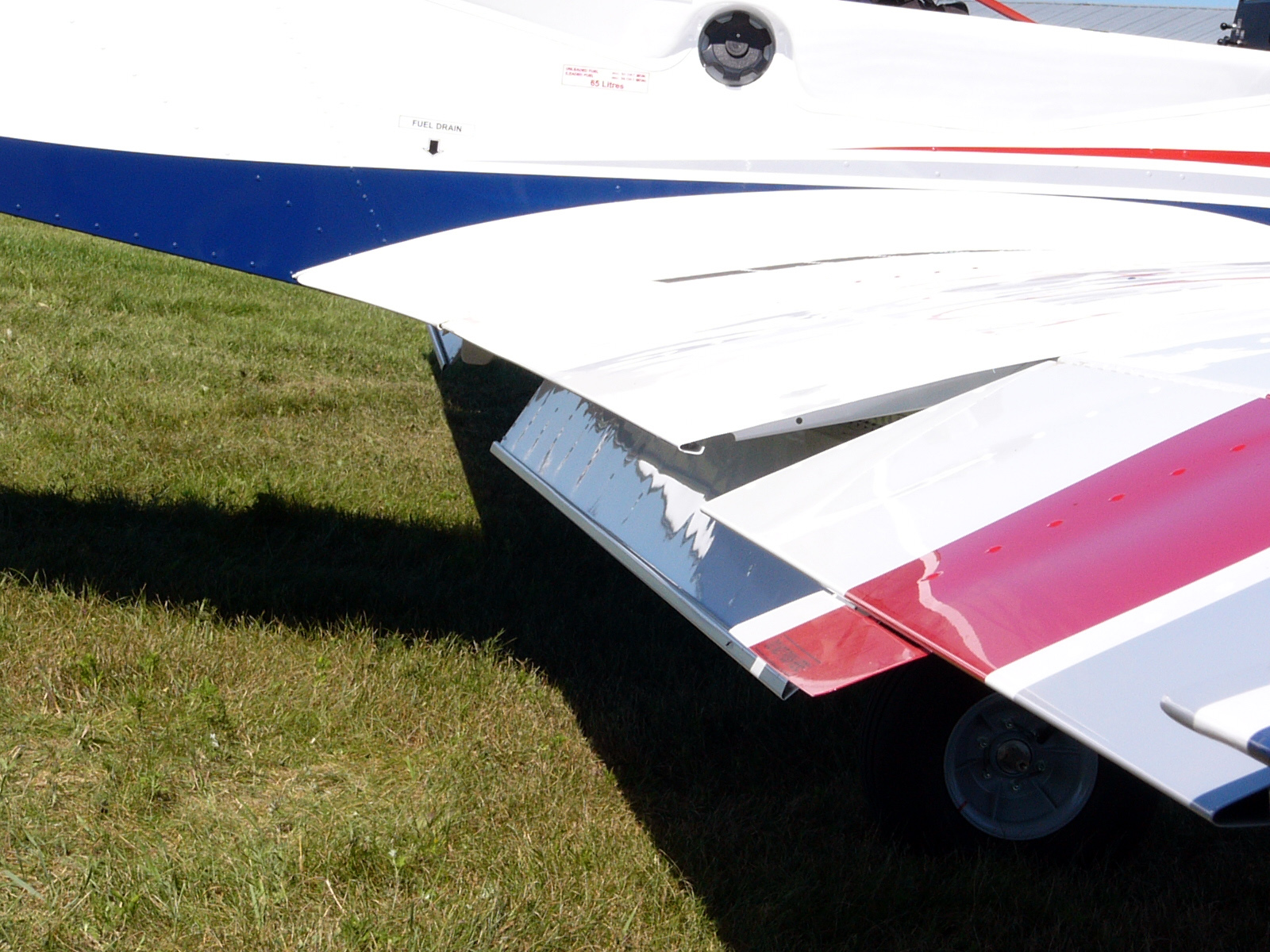
SportStar wing showing the aircraft's split flap arrangement

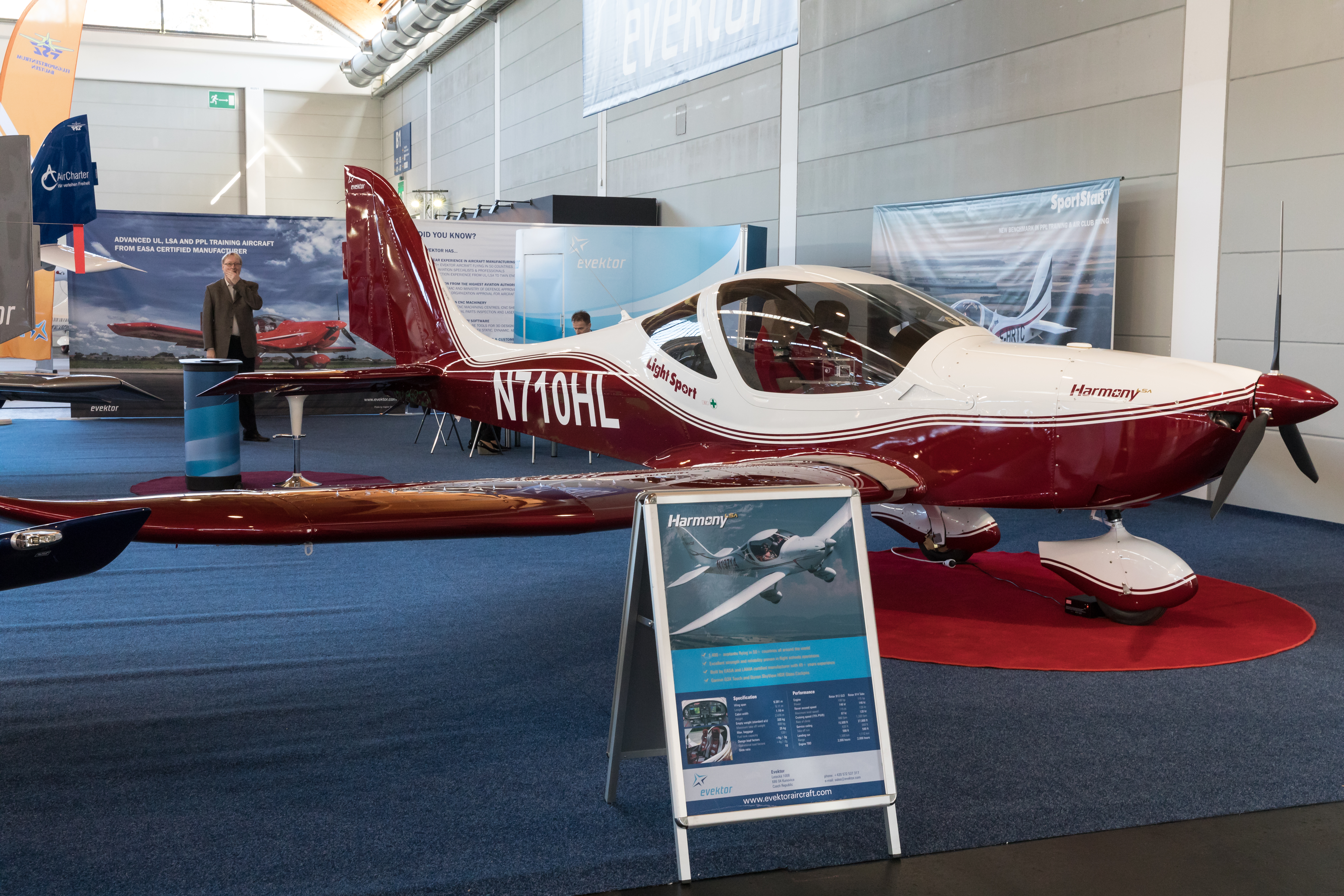
The Harmony LSA at Friedrichsfhafen 2018

The SportStar and EuroStar are a family of a two-seat, light sport aircraft (LSA), manufactured by Evektor-Aerotechnik of Czechia and powered by a Rotax 912ULS 100 horsepower (75 kW) engine.

The SportStar was the first special light-sport aircraft (S-LSA) approved by the US Federal Aviation Administration (FAA), and was named "S-LSA Aircraft of the Year" in 2011 by AeroNews Network. According to Flight International, the SportStar held the number-one seller spot in 2005, which the periodical attributed to its high range of options and overall affordability. The Eurostar was the tenth-best-selling ultralight aircraft in Germany in 2014 according to Aerokurier.

== Development ==
The SportStar and EuroStar were developed together; while the former was specifically developed to meet the needs of the light-sports aircraft (LSA) sector of the general aviation market, the lighter EuroStar was designed for the ultralight-microlight (UL-ML) portion of the European market. The two aircraft, which are grouped together in the same family by their manufacturer, are visually similar; however, the SportStar is slightly heavier and larger than the EuroStar, with a greater wingspan and a marginally wider fuselage. The 550kg maximum weight of the SportStar was a deliberate choice by Evektor so that the aircraft would be compliant with the relatively stringent LSA limitations enacted in countries including Australia and Canada.

The SportStar RTC design was based on the EASA's JAR-VLA certified aircraft standards; Evektor claims that it reflects the latest development in design, safety and cockpit comfort of modern light sport aircraft. According to Evektor, the SportStar was developed to achieve relatively low costs of operation and ease of maintenance, and to specifically satisfy the needs of flight schools. It is claimed by the manufacturer that the aircraft can be operated for half of the typical operating cost of a contemporary training aircraft. According to Flight International, the cost of consumables for the type is comparable to those of a typical car, while the overall operating cost, including depreciation, engine and maintenance reserves, is roughly around €45 per flight hour if flown for a typical 200 hours per year.

Following the US Federal Aviation Administration (FAA) finalisation of the Sport Pilot/Light Sport Aircraft rule in April 2005, the SportStar became the first aircraft to be accepted in the United States as an LSA. The FAA has accepted the SportStar, SportStar Plus, SportStar SL, SportStar Max and the Harmony as LSAs. By the end of 2006, a total of 600 SportStars were reportedly in service around the world.

The SportStar is certified by the European Union Aviation Safety Agency. The EuroStar is not certified by a Europe-widecivil aviation authority; its certification is specific to each country, for example Microlight in UK or ULM (ultra light aircraft) in France An Evektor press release stated that the EuroStar is "type certified" by the Deutscher Aero Club (DAeC).

== Design ==
The SportStar is a two-seat light sport aircraft, intended for recreational flying, touring, basic flight training, and towing roles. It possesses a relatively low-mounted wing along with a bubble canopy, which provides high level of exterior visibility, a particularly desirable attribute for a trainer aircraft. The SportStar is capable of towing sailplanes up to 1544 lbs (700 kg) gross weight, as well as towing banners of up to 1479 sq ft (140 m^{2}). It can also be configured as an amphibian when outfitted with suitable floats. For the safety of its occupants, the SportStar can be fitted with an optional rocket-boosted recovery parachute, which fires upwards and sideways through an aperture in the forward engine panel; this system is manually triggered by the pilot via a handle in the cockpit.

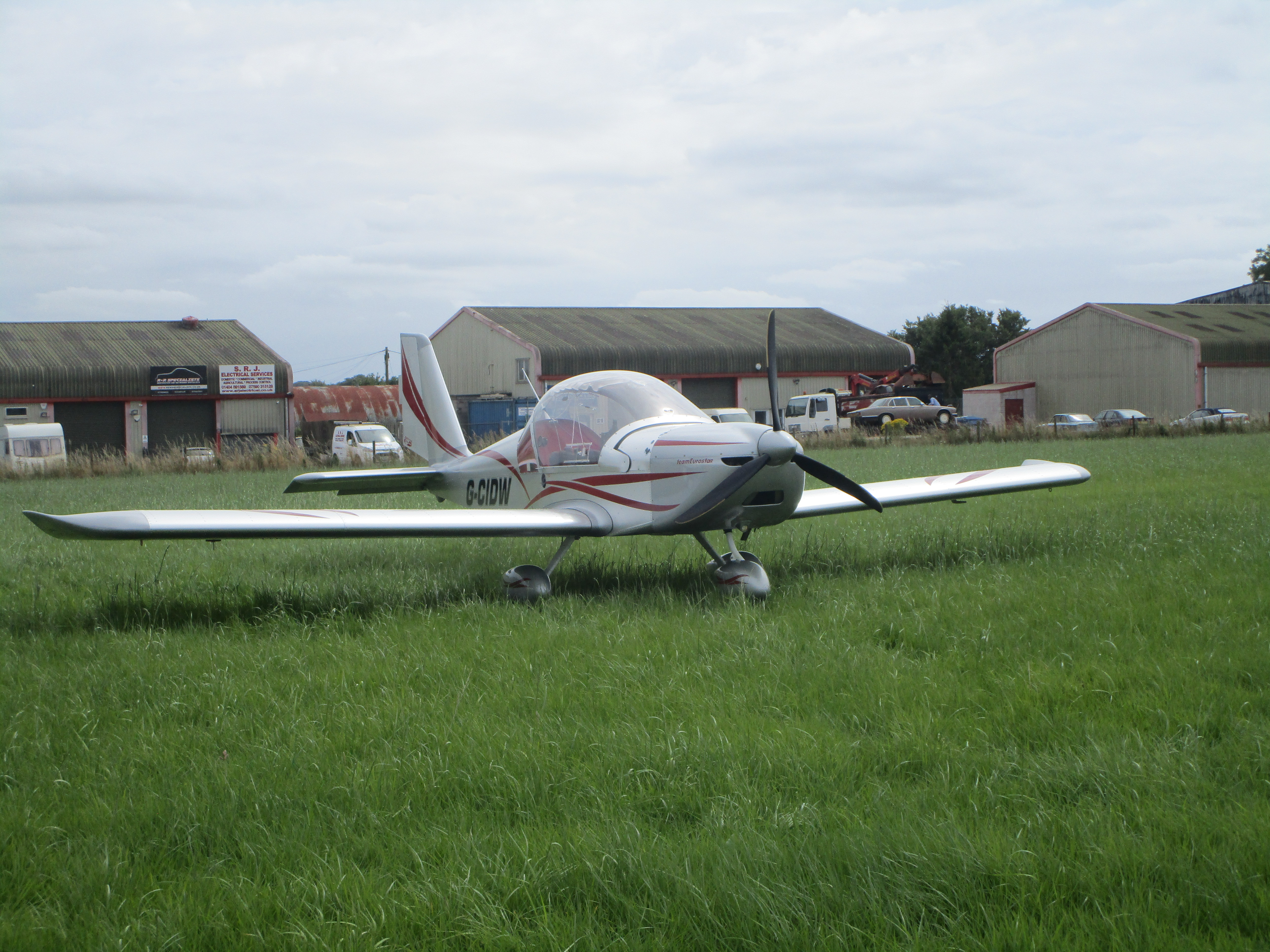
G-CIDW - Evektor EV-97 Eurostar on the grass at Dunkeswell Aerdorome

The aircraft is powered by a single Rotax 912ULS air-cooled piston engine, which typically drives a three-bladed VZLU V230C variable-pitch propeller, although alternative fixed- or variable-pitch propellers can be fitted. This engine can be operated using automotive-standard unleaded petrol; avgas and mogas can also be used for limited periods if required. A push/pull throttle lever is the primary engine control, this being centrally mounted in the base of the instrument panel; it incorporates an uncommon twist function to make fine adjustments to the engine's rpm without moving the lever. A centrally located propeller lever mounted on the cockpit floor is used to adjust the pitch of the propeller. Electrical power is provided by the engine's integrated generator that charges a single 12V battery.

The SportStar is of mostly-metal construction, being primarily made of anodized, corrosion-proofed aluminum; a limited amount of composite materials are used in areas such as panels. As a consequence of the high use of conventional aluminium, the airframe is relatively easy to repair as well as affordable to construct. The airframe uses a pop-riveted and bonded construction, which the company claims will improve fatigue characteristics and provide a longer service life than other methods. The company has also said that this construction technique results in better crashworthiness qualities, prevents rivet zippering during an accident, and is quieter in flight due to the elimination of oil-canning and flexing tendencies.

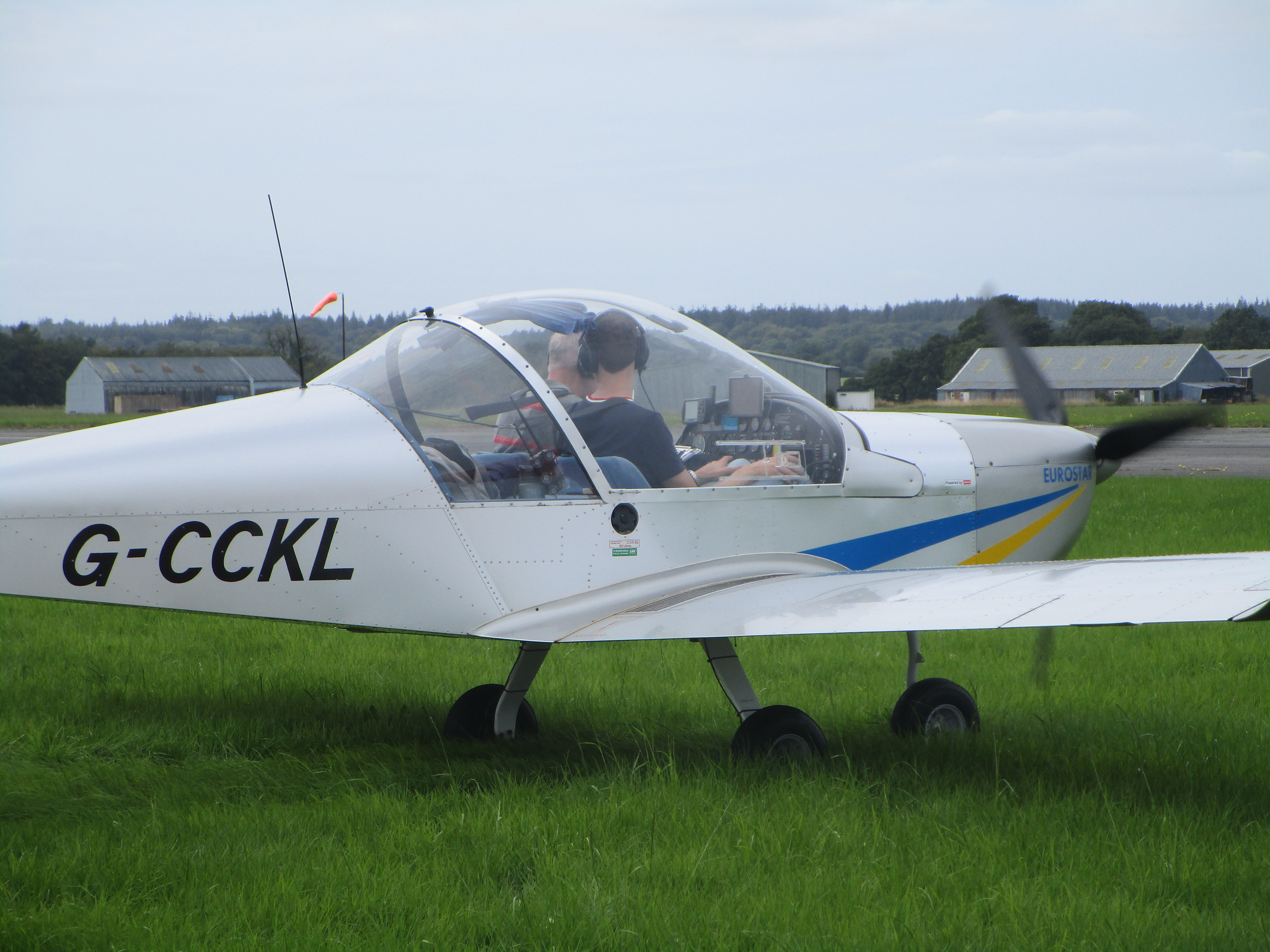
G-CCKL - Evektor EV-97 Eurostar at Dunkeswell Aerodrome

The cockpit is provided with electrically operated flight instrumentation, a VHF radio unit, transponder, GNSS and ILS navigation systems, and lighting. In a typical arrangement the console has five standard flight instruments, although different layouts and other instruments are options. Conventional analogue engine indicators are installed to the right of the instrumentation console. The cockpit can be heated via ducted engine air, while cooling is provided via compact openable panels in the canopy. The wing, which was developed in-house, has manually actuated split flaps that can be set to four positions as standard; electrically actuated flaps are available as an option. Early production aircraft had a centrally mounted single fuel tank behind the seats with a maximum capacity of 65 litres; this was later replaced by a pair of integral fuel tanks within the wings for a maximum capacity of 120 litres, freeing the fuselage space for baggage.

== Variants ==
EuroStar SL
Model for the European ultralight category, with a gross weight of 1,041 lb (472 kg)
EuroStar SL+
Version of the EuroStar SL with a new wing and integral fuel tanks, bigger baggage compartment and lower empty weight by 8 kg (18 lb). More than 1,000 have been built and it was one of the top ten ultralights sold in Germany in 2014 according to Aerokurier.
EuroStar SLW
Model for the European ultralight category, with a gross weight of 1,041 lb (472 kg). It combines the EuroStar fuselage with the wing and stabilizer from the Harmony.
Harmony
Model for the US LSA market, based on the Harmony airframe, with enlarged ailerons and rudder to improve crosswind capabilities, an improved wing, winglets and tail, wider and longer cockpit, as well as refined wheel pants and other fairings.
SportStar
Initial model
SportStar SL
Improved model
SportStar Max
Version for the US LSA market with a gross weight of 1,320 lb (599 kg)
SportStar RTC
SportStar RTC was developed to meet EASA VLA certification and intended for use in flight training.
Evektor EPOS
Electric aircraft version, using the SportStar RTC fuselage and a new wing design.

== Specifications (SportStar Max) ==
Data from Jane's All the World's Aircraft 2010-11

General characteristics

- Crew: one
- Capacity: one passenger
- Length: 5.98 m (19 ft 7 in)
- Wingspan: 8.645 m (28 ft 4 in)
- Height: 2.475 m (8 ft 1 in)
- Wing area: 10.6 m^{2} (114 sq ft)
- Airfoil: NACA 2315 mod
- Empty weight: 309 kg (681 lb)
- Max takeoff weight: 600 kg (1,323 lb)
- Fuel capacity: 118 L (31 US gal; 26 imp gal) usable / 85 kg (187 lb) max fuel weight
- Powerplant: 1 × Rotax 912ULS four-cylinder air and liquid-cooled, horizontally-opposed, piston engine, 73.4 kW (98.4 hp)
- Propellers: 3-bladed VZLU V230C ground adjustable propeller

Performance

- Maximum speed: 213 km/h (132 mph, 115 kn)
- Cruise speed: 204 km/h (127 mph, 110 kn) at 75% power
- Stall speed: 83 km/h (52 mph, 45 kn) power off flaps up
- Never exceed speed: 270 km/h (170 mph, 150 kn)
- Range: 1,300 km (810 mi, 700 nmi) with max fuel
- Endurance: 8 hours 30 minutes
- Service ceiling: 4,720 m (15,490 ft)
- g limits: +6/-3
- Rate of climb: 5.2 m/s (1,020 ft/min)
- Wing loading: 56.6 kg/m^{2} (11.6 lb/sq ft)
- Power/mass: 0.128 kW/kg (0.078 hp/lb)
- Take-off run: 190 m (623 ft)
- Take-off distance to 15 m (49 ft): 365 m (1,198 ft)
- Landing run: 180 m (591 ft)

Avionics

Garmin G3X fit
- 10.6" PFD - Primary Flight Display (GDU 460)
- 10.6" MFD - Multi Function Display (GDU 460)
- 2 ADAHRS - Air Data and Attitude and Heading Reference System (GSU 25)
- Magnetometer (GMU 22)
- EMS (GEA 24)
- OAT sensor (GTP 59)
- GPS antenas, Synthetic Vision, backup battery
- Back-up Air speed indicator + Altimeter (dia 2 ¼")
- COMM Garmin GTR225A + Transponder GTX328 (mode S) + ACK A-30
- Compass SIRS
