= Kristína Royová =

Slovak Protestant activist, thinker, revivalist, novelist and poet

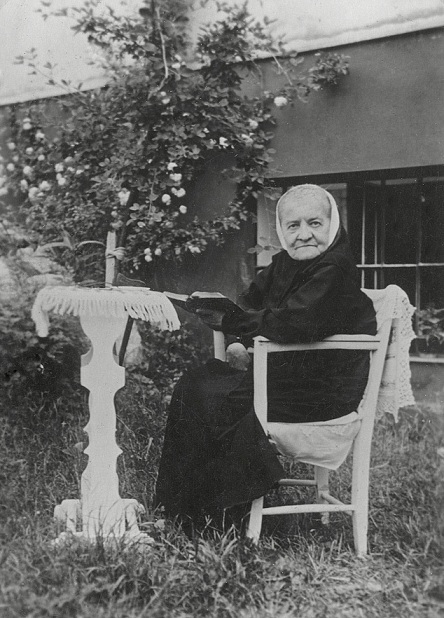
- Born: 18 August 1860; Stará Turá, Austrian Empire, (present-day Slovakia)
- Died: 27 December 1936; Stará Turá, Czechoslovakia, (present-day Slovakia)
- Citizenship: Austrian Empire, Austro-Hungarian Empire, Czechoslovakia
- Occupation(s): Protestant activist, thinker, revivalist, novelist and poet
- Known for: literary works translated into 36 languages

Signature
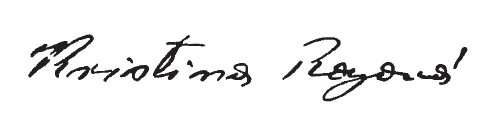

Kristína Royová (18 August 1860, in Stará Turá – 27 December 1936, in Stará Turá) was a Slovak Protestant activist, thinker, revivalist, novelist and poet.

She was founder of the Blue Cross and diaconal centre in Stará Turá. Her literary works were translated into 36 languages. During the reign of communist party in former Czechoslovakia, Christian literature written by her was among those frequently confiscated by state security service ŠtB and at the same time she was blacklisted on the socialist era school curricula. She is now considered to be the Slovak author with the most frequently translated literary works and some literary critics regard her for being a "Slovak Kierkegaard".

== Early life ==
Parents of Kristína Royová were descendants of two prominent Lutheran families. Father August Roy, close friend of J.M. Hurban, was member of Slavic society, co-founder of Matica Slovenská and Slovak gymnasiums (high schools). Mother was from house of Holuby, her brother Jozef Ľudovít Holuby was prominent Slovak botanist, ethnographer, church historian and archaeologist and her other brother Karol Holuby was executed close to present-day Šulekovo village in the revolutionary year of 1848. The childhood of Kristína Royová was associated with Lutheran parish in Stará Turá, where local chaplains were at the same time her teachers. Still, the overall education she received had not fulfilled her vast intellectual potential. The great contribution to development of her skills was a one-year study at higher secondary school in Bratislava where she managed to master the German language.

== Literary works ==
- 1882 / 1884 - Tri obrázky (Three pictures), narratives (published in Národnie noviny)
- 1893 - Bez Boha na svete (Without God in the world)
- 1898 - Božie charaktery (God-like characters)
- 1898 - Splnená túžba (Fulfilled longing)
- 1901 - Bludári (Heretics)
- 1901 - Dôležitá pravda (Important truth)
- 1901 - Istota a neistota (Confidence and doubt)
- 1901 - Lotova žena (Lot's wife)
- 1901 - Pekný začiatok-smutný koniec (Nice beginning -sad ending)
- 1901 - Nebolo miesta (There was no room)
- 1901 - Podivné hodiny (Peculiar clock)
- 1901 - Za živa do priepasti (Live into the abyss)
- 1901 - Stroskotaná loď (The wrecked ship)
- 1903 - Sluha (Servant)
- 1903 - Šťastie (Happiness)
- 1903 - Za vysokú cenu (For a high cost)
- 1904 - Ako zbohatnúť (How to get reach)
- 1904 - Divné milosrdenstvo (Amazing mercy)
- 1904 - Šťastní ľudia (Happy people)
- 1904 - Divní rozsievači (Peculiar sowers)
- 1904 - Dieťa hausírerov (The child of peddlers)
- 1906 - Vo vyhnanstve (In the exile)
- 1907 - Šťastlivé Vianoce (Happy Christmas)
- 1909 - Ako kvapôčka putovala (How the little drop wandered around)
- 1909 - V slnečnej krajine (In the sunny land)
- 1909 - Opilcove dieťa (The child of alcoholic)
- 1910 - Ako prišli lastovičky domov (How the swallows returned home)
- 1910 - Ako zomrel slávičok (The death of nightingale)
- 1910 - Nemoc a pomoc (The disease and help)
- 1910 - Tarsenský
- 1912 - Za presvedčenie čili z Mezopotámie do Kanaánu (Because of persuasion hence from Mesopotamia to Canaan)
- 1913 - Stratení (Lost)
- 1915 - Pošta (The mail)
- 1917 - Pozdrav zo Starej Turej (Greetings from Stará Turá)
- 1920 - Druhá žena (The second wife)
- 1920 - Zpráva z roku 1919 (The message from 1919)
- 1920 - Otcovrah (The parricide)
- 1921 - Keď nikde nebolo pomoci (When there was no help anywhere)
- 1921 - Štyri rozprávočky pre veľké a malé deti (Four fairy-tales for big and small kids)
- 1921 - V pevnej ruke (In the firm grasp)
- 1922 - Ztratení (Lost)
- 1922 - Traja kamaráti (Three friends)
- 1922 - Zachránená (Saved)
- 1924 - Výstražný sen (Warning dream)
- 1924 - Poslednia cesta (The last journey)
- 1924 - Kde bol jeho otec? (Where was his father?)
- 1925 - Na rozhraní (On the verge)
- 1926 - Prišiel domov (Returned home)
- 1926 - Za vysokú cenu (For a high cost)
- 1927 - Susedia (The neighbours)
- 1927 - Ako trpaslík zabil obra (How the troll killed ogre)
- 1927 - Blízko ešte neni vnútri (Close, but still not inside)
- 1928 - Staniša
- 1929 - Za svetlom a so svetlom. Rozpomienky Kristíny Royovej (Going after light and with light. Memories of Krisína Royová)
- 1930 - Navrátený raj (Given back paradise)
- 1930 - Abigail
- 1931 - Keď život začínal. Slnečné dieťa (When life aroused. The sunny child.)
- 1935 - Tuláci (Wanderers)
- Kúzlo otčiny (The charm of the fatherland), narrative (available only in handwriting)
- V okruží panslavizmu (Surrounded by panslavism), narrative (available only in handwriting)
- Pod práporom lásky (Under the flag of love), narrative (available only in handwriting)
