= Rotex Electric REB 90 =

Electric motor for aircraft

- Type: Electric aircraft engine
- National origin: Czech Republic
- Manufacturer: Rotex Electric
- Major applications: Ultralight aircraft

The Rotex Electric REB 90 is a Czech electric motor for powering electric aircraft, designed and produced by Rotex Electric of Prague.

== Design and development ==
The REB 90 is a brushless 350 volt design producing 80 kW (107 hp). Its rotational speed of 1800-2400rpm allows it to turn a propeller at efficient speeds without the need for a reduction drive.

== Specifications (REB 90) ==
Data from Tacke and manufacturer

=== General characteristics ===
- Type: Brushless electric aircraft engine
- Length: 212 mm (8.3 in)
- Diameter: 270 mm (10.6 in)
- Dry weight: 20 kg (44.1 lb)

=== Components ===
- Cooling system: air or water
- Reduction gear: none

=== Performance ===
- Power output: 80 kW (107 hp) at 2400 rpm
- Voltage: 350–380 V
- Power-to-weight ratio: 4.0 kW/kg

== See also ==
Related lists

- List of aircraft engines
