= Rotex Electric =

- Type: Privately held company
- Industry: Aerospace
- Founded: 2003
- Headquarters: Prague, Czech Republic
- Products: Electric aircraft engines
- Website: www.rotexelectric.eu

Rotex Electric is a Czech aircraft engine manufacturer based in Prague. The company specializes in the design and manufacture of electric motors for light aircraft, as well as for automobiles and other applications.

The company was founded in 2003.

The company produces four series of electric motors, REB, REG, RET and REX, in a variety of power outputs. The REB 90 is an example, a brushless 350 volt design that produces 80 kW (107 hp) for aircraft use.

== Aircraft ==
Summary of aircraft engines built by Rotex Electric:

- Rotex Electric REB 20
- Rotex Electric REB 30
- Rotex Electric REB 50
- Rotex Electric REB 90
- Rotex Electric REG 20
- Rotex Electric REG 30
- Rotex Electric RET 30
- Rotex Electric RET 60
- Rotex Electric REX 30
- Rotex Electric REX 50
- Rotex Electric REX 90
