= Uherské Hradiště =

Town in Zlín Region, Czech Republic

- Town
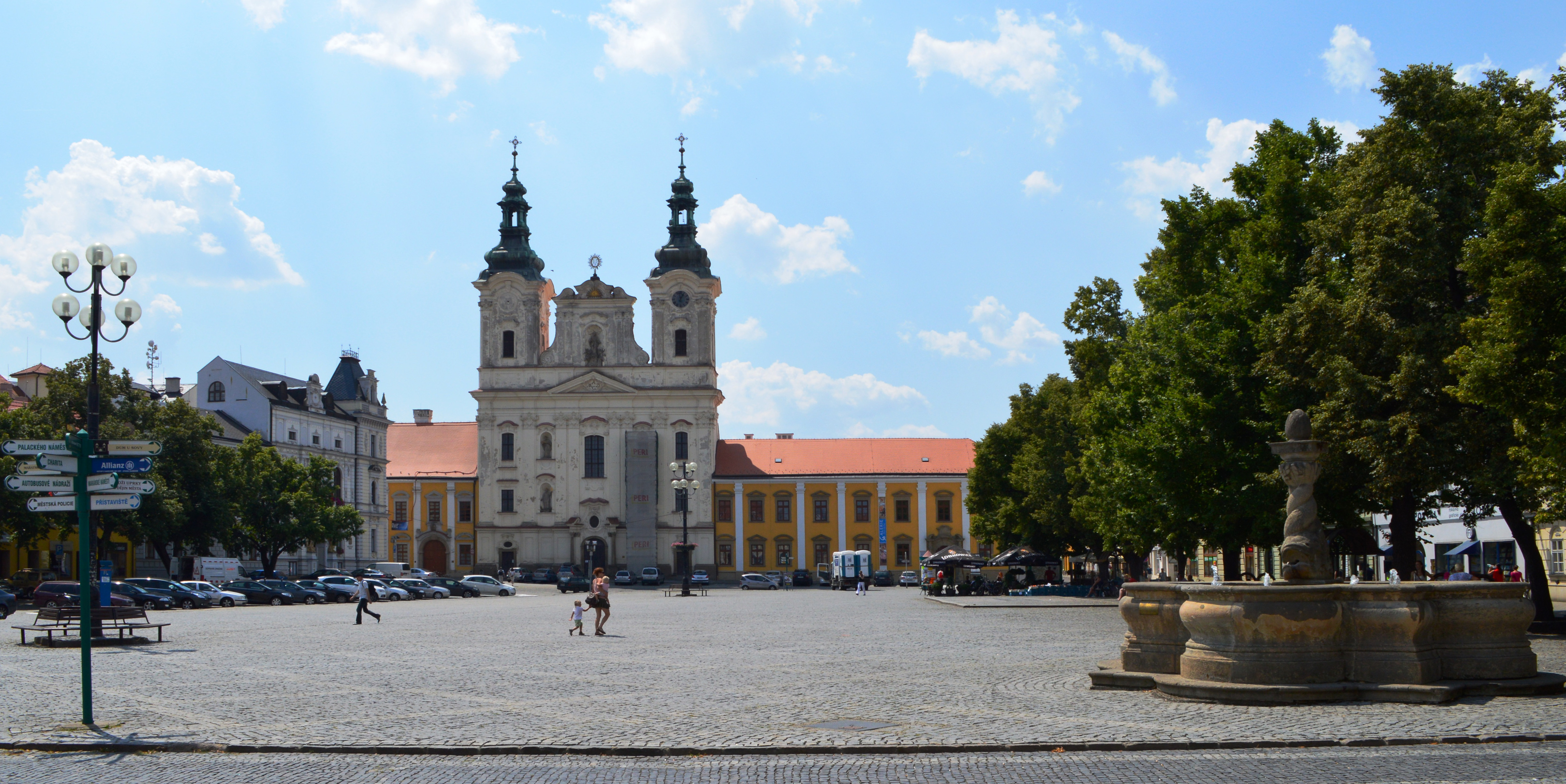
- Town square with the Church of Saint Francis Xavier

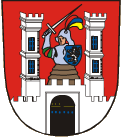
- Flag Coat of arms

- Location in the Czech Republic
- Coordinates: 49°4′11″N 17°27′35″E
- Country: Czech Republic
- Region: Zlín
- District: Uherské Hradiště
- Founded: 1257

Government
  - Mayor: Stanislav Blaha (ODS)

Area
  - Total: 21.26 km^{2} (8.21 sq mi)
- Elevation: 179 m (587 ft)

Population (2026-01-01)
  - Total: 24,852
  - Density: 1,169/km^{2} (3,028/sq mi)
- Time zone: UTC+1 (CET)
  - Summer (DST): UTC+2 (CEST)
- Postal codes: 686 01, 686 04 – 686 06
- Website: www.mesto-uh.cz

Uherské Hradiště (Czech pronunciation: [ˈuɦɛrskɛː ˈɦraɟɪʃcɛ]; German: Ungarisch Hradisch) is a town in the Zlín Region of the Czech Republic. It has about 25,000 inhabitants. The agglomeration with the two neighbouring towns of Staré Město and Kunovice has over 37,000 inhabitants. Uherské Hradiště is located on the left bank of the Morava River.

Uherské Hradiště is the centre of the cultural region of Moravian Slovakia. The town was founded in 1257. The history of the town and some of its most important monuments are connected with the Jesuits, who acted here between 1644 and 1773. The historic town centre is well preserved and is protected as an urban monument zone.

== Administrative division ==
Uherské Hradiště consists of seven municipal parts (in brackets population according to the 2021 census):

- Uherské Hradiště (12,714)
- Jarošov (2,120)
- Mařatice (6,891)
- Míkovice (814)
- Rybárny (258)
- Sady (1,609)
- Vésky (613)

== Etymology ==
The name literally translates as 'Hungarian gord', meaning "a fortified settlement near the Hungarian border".

== Geography ==
Uherské Hradiště is located about 23 km (14 mi) southwest of Zlín. It creates an urbanistically merged agglomeration with the neighbouring towns of Staré Město and Kunovice. The western part of the municipal territory lies in the Lower Morava Valley and the eastern part in the Vizovice Highlands. The highest point is at 337 m (1,106 ft) above sea level.

The town is situated on the left bank of the Morava River, which forms the northern border of the municipal territory. The Olšava River flows through the southern part of the territory.

== History ==
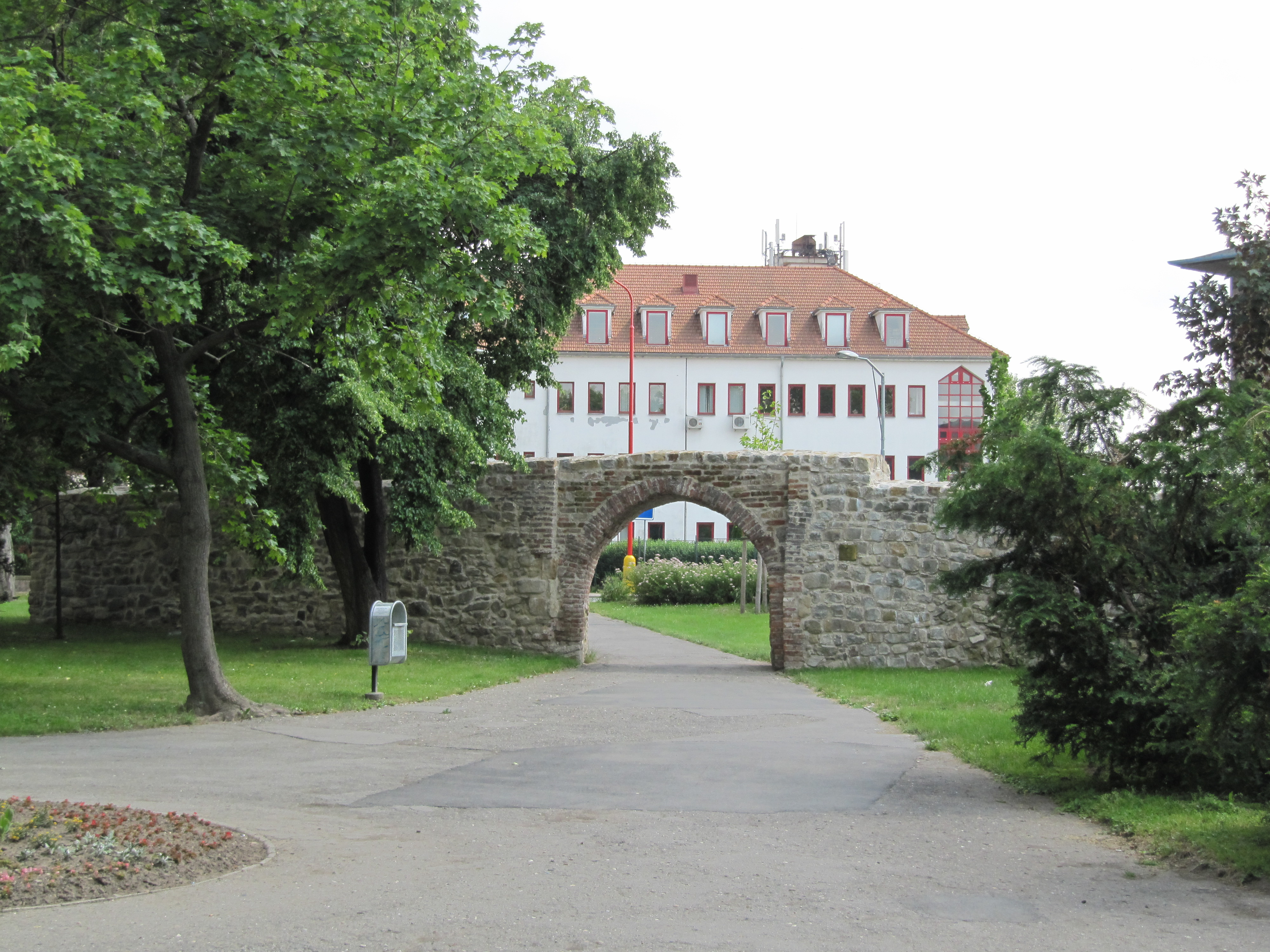
Fragment of town walls

A predecessor of Uherské Hradiště was a settlement and fortification system on three island in the Morava River, founded by Slavic tribes in the early 9th century. The settlement disappeared after the fall of the Great Moravian Empire.

The town of was founded in 1257 by King Ottokar II to protect the nearby monastery in Velehrad. It was originally named Nový Velehrad ('new Velehrad') and then Hradiště. In 1587, the name Uherské Hradiště was used for the first time.

In the 14th century, stone walls were built and replaced the original wooden palisades. In the following centuries, the fortification system has been continuously improved. Due to its location, Uherské Hradiště repeatedly faced raids. The town was threatened by the Cumans in the 16th century, by military clashes during the Thirty Years' War, or by Turkish invasions during the Austro-Turkish War (1716–1718). The town was not conquered until 1742 by the Prussian Army.

From 1644 to 1773, the Jesuits acted in the town. Their work increased the cultural and spiritual life of the town. The order founded complex of buildings which included Jesuit college, Church of Saint Francis Xavier and Jesuit school.

In the 1780s, Uherské Hradiště ceased to function as a fortress. In the mid-19th century, the town began to expand beyond the walls. Construction growth continued in the late 19th century when representative building were constructed, and in the early 20th century when industrial companies were founded.

Uherské Hradiště was hit by the 1997 Central European flood.

== Demographics ==
Historical population

Year	Pop.	±%
1869	5,659	—
1880	6,663	+17.7%
1890	7,232	+8.5%
1900	8,925	+23.4%
1910	9,451	+5.9%

Year	Pop.	±%
1921	10,051	+6.3%
1930	10,554	+5.0%
1950	13,402	+27.0%
1961	15,616	+16.5%
1970	19,427	+24.4%

Year	Pop.	±%
1980	25,015	+28.8%
1991	26,765	+7.0%
2001	26,876	+0.4%
2011	25,818	−3.9%
2021	25,019	−3.1%

Source: Censuses

== Transport ==
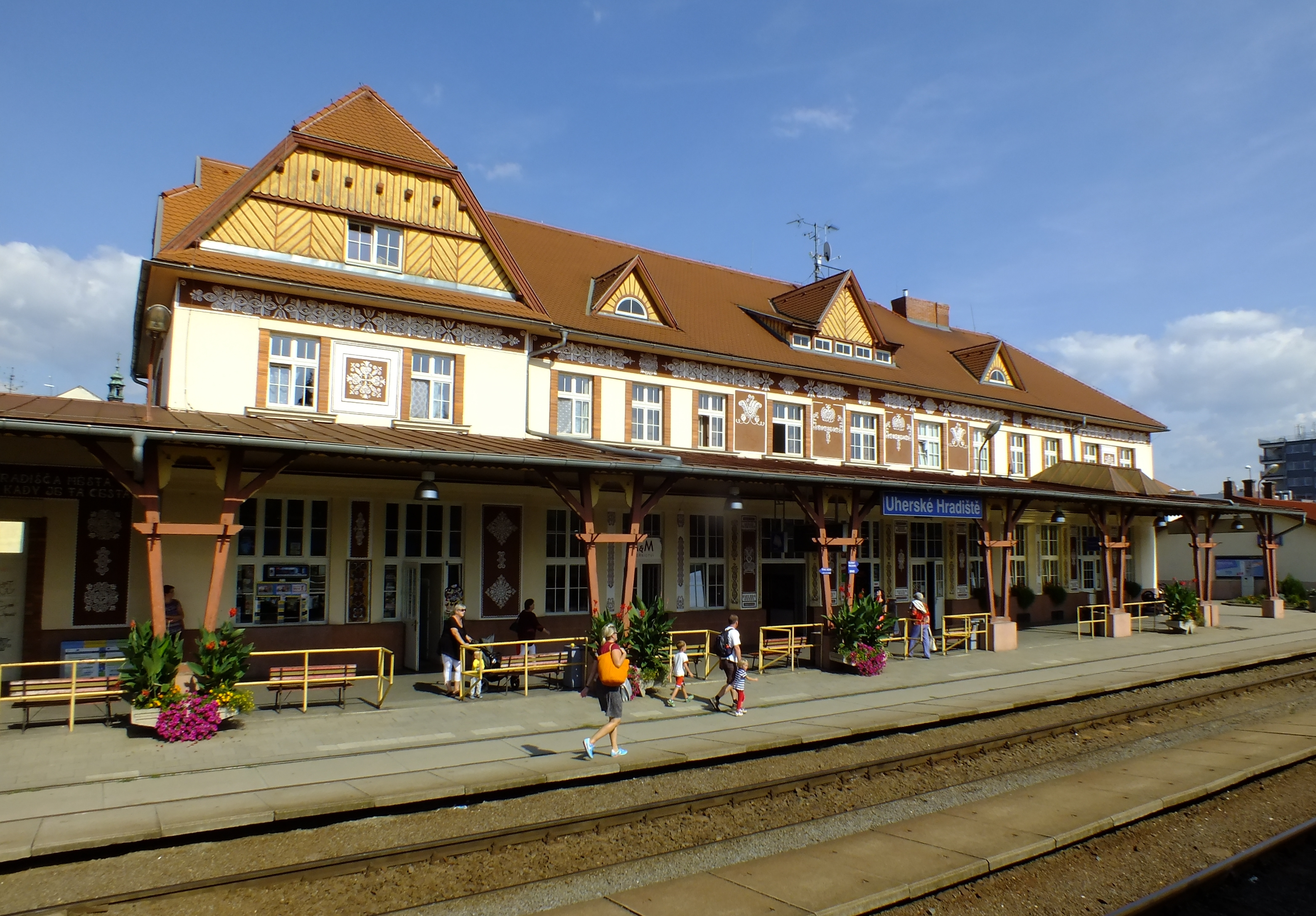
Uherské Hradiště railway station

The Uherské Hradiště agglomeration is served by eight urban bus lines (numbered 2–9, after line 1 was cancelled), as well as more regional and long-distance routes.

The I/55 road (the section from Olomouc to Hodonín) runs through the town. The I/50 road (part of the European route E50) from Brno to the Czech–Slovak border in Starý Hrozenkov passes through the southern part of the municipal territory.

Uherské Hradiště is located on the intraregional railway lines Prague–Luhačovice via Olomouc and Brno–Staré Město. In addition, the town is the start of the local line to Bylnice, which is also served by Vésky train stop.

== Education ==
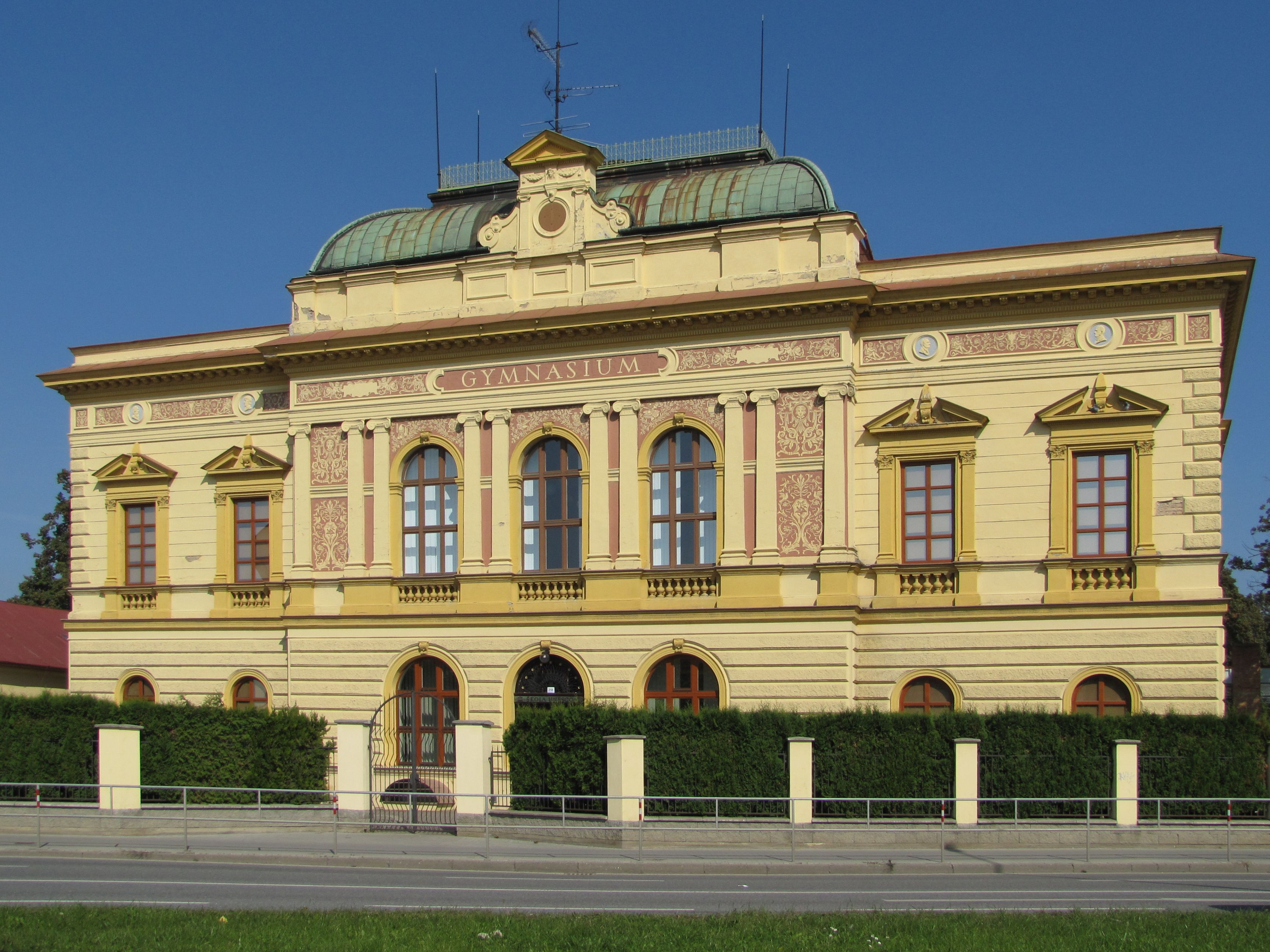
Uherské Hradiště Gymnasium

The Uherské Hradiště Gymnasium, founded 16 September 1884, is the oldest Czech-speaking grammar school in the region of Moravian Slovakia.

== Culture ==
Uherské Hradiště is the centre of the cultural region of Moravian Slovakia, which is known for its characteristic folklore, music, costumes, traditions and winemaking.

Uherské Hradiště is known for its film festival named Summer Film School (Letní filmová škola). Founded in 1975 in Písek, it has been held annually in Uherské Hradiště since 1992.

== Sport ==
The town is home to a football club 1. FC Slovácko, which plays in the Czech First League at the Městský fotbalový stadion Miroslava Valenty. The town also has an ice rink with a capacity of 1,500 visitors, which is home to HC Uherské Hradiště playing the 2nd Czech ice hockey league.

== Sights ==
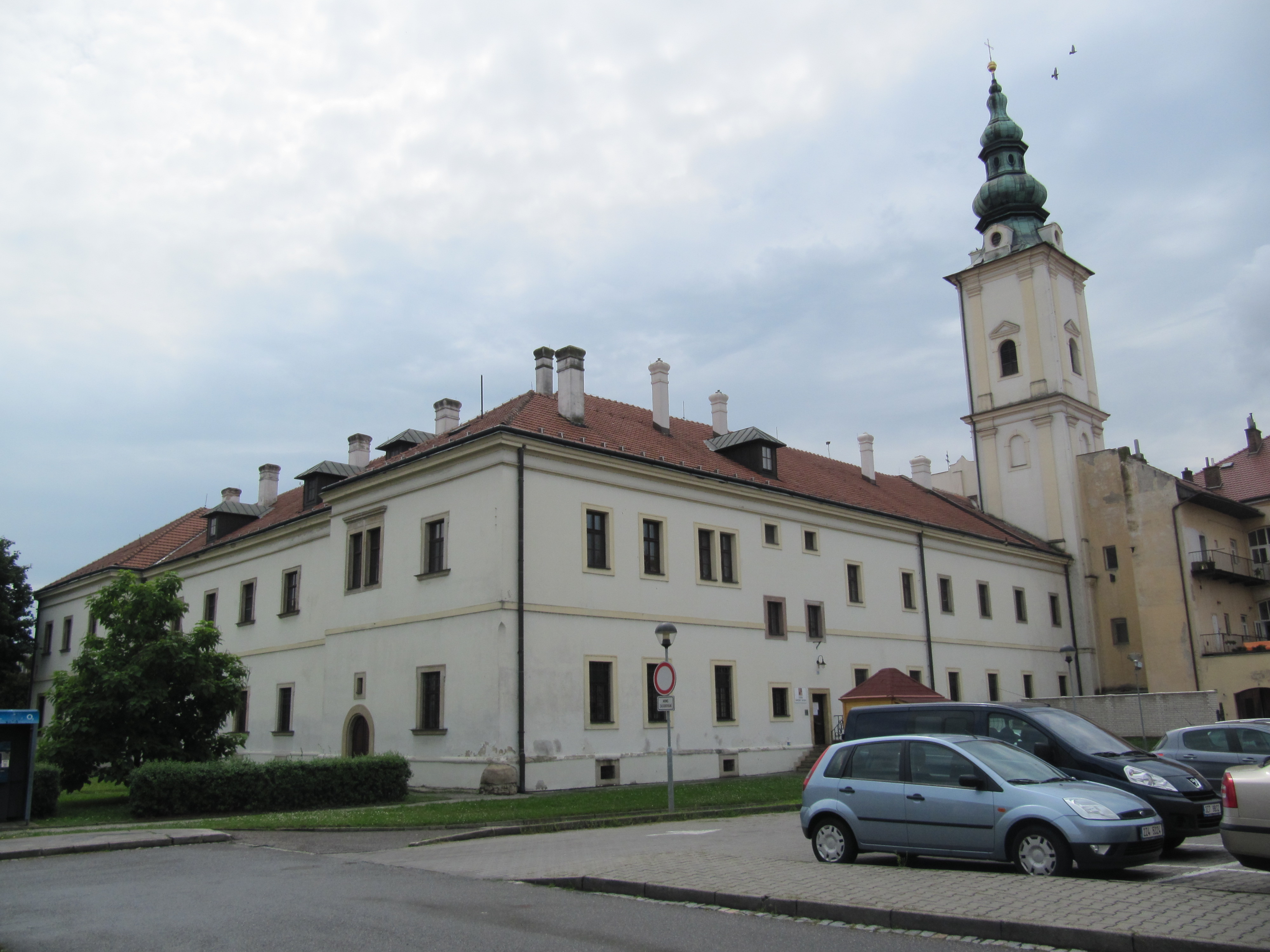
Franciscan monastery and Church of the Annunciation of the Virgin Mary

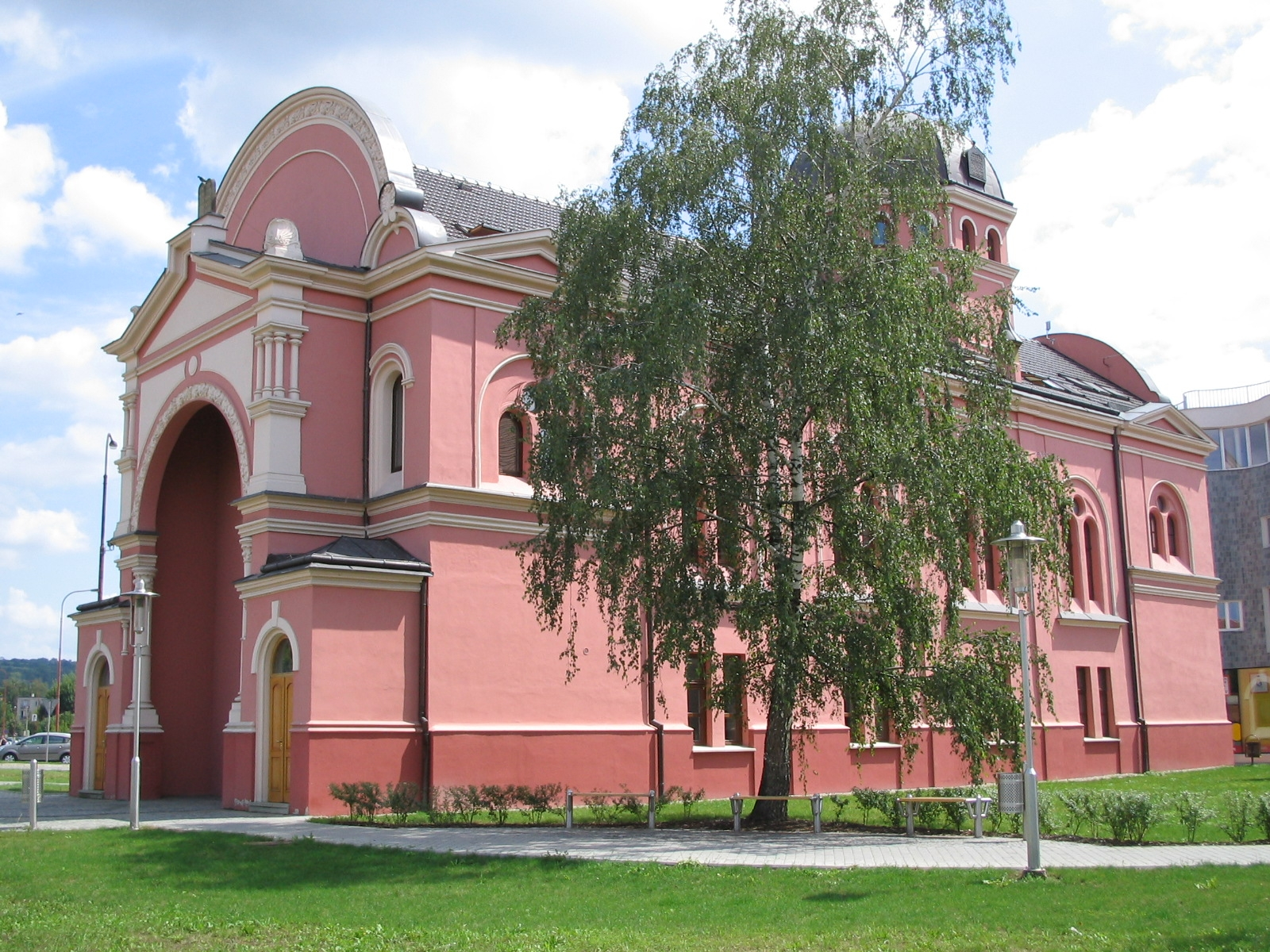
Former synagogue

The main part of the Baroque Jesuit complex is the Church of Saint Francis Xavier, built in 1670–1685. It is the main landmark of Masarykovo náměstí, the main town square. The adjacent former Jesuit college was built in 1654–1662 and today houses the tourist information centre, the gallery of Joža Uprka, and an exposition on history of the town. The former Jesuit school built in 1700–1737, today known as Reduta, is used for cultural and social purposes. The former Jesuit garden is now a town park.

The Franciscan monastery was founded in 1491. The building was not compelely finished until the early 18th century, when the baroque reconstructions were also made. The monastery is a significant monument of transregional importance with valuable interiors. Construction of the adjacent Church of Annunciation of the Virgin Mary also began in the early 16th century, but was finished after 1605.

Moravian Slovakia Museum is one of the most popular ethnographic museums in Moravia. It was founded in 1895. The side wall of the museum building is decorated by a mosaic allegory of the seasons by Jano Köhler from 1905. The new building of the museum was built in 1942 according to the design by Bohuslav Fuchs. The building is protected as a cultural monument. The museum also manages the Moravian Slovakia Museum's Gallery. The art gallery seats in the Baroque building of a former armory, which was built in 1721–1723.

The synagogue was built in 1875. In 1904, it was rebuilt and the neo-Romanesque façade was added. It was burned down in 1944 and reconstructed after World War II. Nowadays, the former synagogue serves as a library.

Uherské Hradiště railway station won the Building of the Year award after its reconstruction in 2004, and in 2011 was chosen as the "most beautiful Czech railway station".

== Notable people ==
- Adolf Jellinek (1821–1893), rabbi
- Ernst Sträussler (1872–1959), neuropathologist
- Božena Benešová (1873–1936), novelist and poet
- Jindřich Prucha (1886–1914), painter
- Anton Gala (1891–1977), Slovak ophthalmologist; studied here
- Jan Antonín Baťa (1898–1965), businessman
- Otakar Borůvka (1899–1995), mathematician; studied here
- Zdeněk Chalabala (1899–1962), conductor
- Dan H. Yaalon (1924–2014), Israeli pedologist and soil scientist
- Věra Suková (1931–1982), tennis player
- Paul Speckmann (born 1963), American singer and musician; lives here
- Petr Nečas (born 1964), politician and former Prime Minister
- Ladislav Kohn (born 1975), ice hockey player
- Radim Bičánek (born 1975), ice hockey player
- Tatana Sterba (born 1976), Swiss DJ
- Michal Tabara (born 1979), tennis player
- Lukáš Sadílek (born 1996), footballer
- Michal Sadílek (born 1999), footballer
- David Jurásek (born 2000), footballer
- Matěj Kovář (born 2000), footballer

== Twin towns – sister cities ==
Uherské Hradiště is twinned with:

- Bridgwater, England, United Kingdom
- Krosno, Poland
- Mayen, Germany
- Sárvár, Hungary
- Skalica, Slovakia
