= Kunovice =

- Town
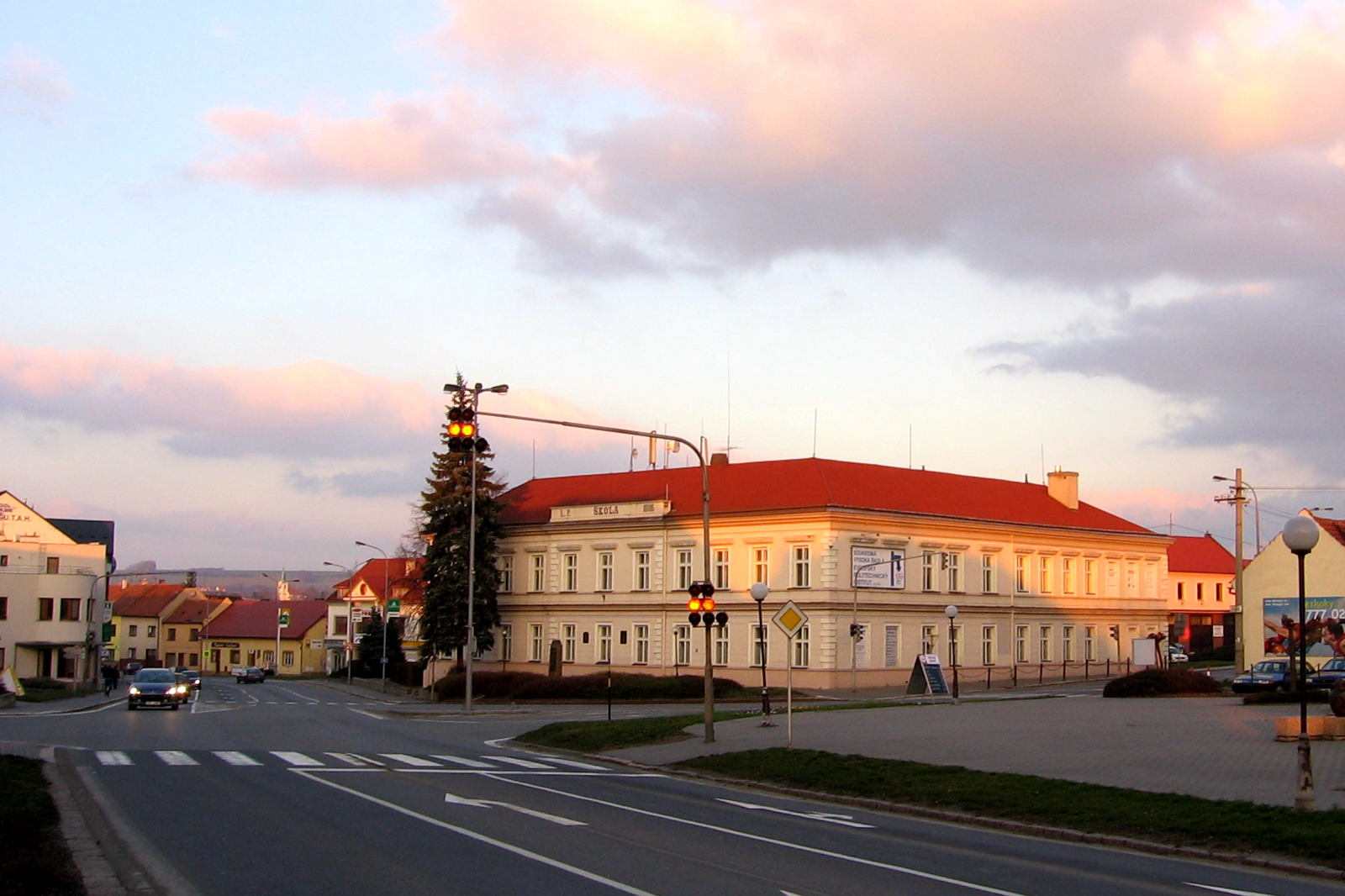
- Town square

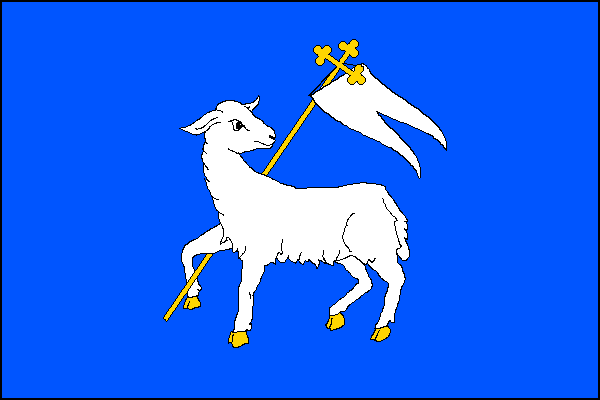
- Flag Coat of arms

- Location in the Czech Republic
- Coordinates: 49°2′31″N 17°27′59″E
- Country: Czech Republic
- Region: Zlín
- District: Uherské Hradiště
- First mentioned: 1196

Government
  - Mayor: Lukáš Libosvár

Area
  - Total: 28.55 km^{2} (11.02 sq mi)
- Elevation: 198 m (650 ft)

Population (2026-01-01)
  - Total: 5,592
  - Density: 195.9/km^{2} (507.3/sq mi)
- Time zone: UTC+1 (CET)
  - Summer (DST): UTC+2 (CEST)
- Postal code: 686 04
- Website: www.mesto-kunovice.cz

Kunovice (Czech pronunciation: [ˈkunovɪtsɛ]; German: Kunowitz) is a town in Uherské Hradiště District in the Zlín Region of the Czech Republic. It has about 5,600 inhabitants. The town is located on the Olšava River, on the border between the Vizovice Highlands and Lower Morava Valley. It is known for the aircraft manufacturer Aircraft Industries and the private international Kunovice Airport.

Kunovice was founded in the 12th century at the latest, but it became a town only in 1997. The main landmark of Kunovice is the Church of Church of Saints Peter and Paul.

== Geography ==
Kunovice forms a conurbation with neighbouring Uherské Hradiště. It lies on the border between the Vizovice Highlands and Lower Morava Valley. The highest point is the hill Hluboček at 351 m (1,152 ft) above sea level. The Olšava River flows through the town and then flows into the Morava, which forms the northern border of the municipal territory.

== History ==
The first written mention of Kunovice is from 1196. Until the establishment of Uherské Hradiště in the mid-13th century, it was an important administrative centre and defensive point with a castle. From the beginning of the 15th century, Kunovice was referred to as a market town.

In the 1930s, when an Avia factory was established, Kunovice began to transform from an agriculture community to an industrial one. In 1949–1954 and 1972–1990, Kunovice was a municipal part of Uherské Hradiště. Kunovice gained the town status in 1997.

== Demographics ==
Historical population

| Year | Pop. | ±% |
|---|---|---|
| 1869 | 3,364 | — |
| 1880 | 3,539 | +5.2% |
| 1890 | 3,776 | +6.7% |
| 1900 | 4,075 | +7.9% |
| 1910 | 4,452 | +9.3% |

| Year | Pop. | ±% |
|---|---|---|
| 1921 | 4,698 | +5.5% |
| 1930 | 4,520 | −3.8% |
| 1950 | 4,800 | +6.2% |
| 1961 | 5,333 | +11.1% |
| 1970 | 5,368 | +0.7% |

| Year | Pop. | ±% |
|---|---|---|
| 1980 | 5,558 | +3.5% |
| 1991 | 5,195 | −6.5% |
| 2001 | 5,152 | −0.8% |
| 2011 | 5,496 | +6.7% |
| 2021 | 5,337 | −2.9% |

Source: Censuses

== Economy ==
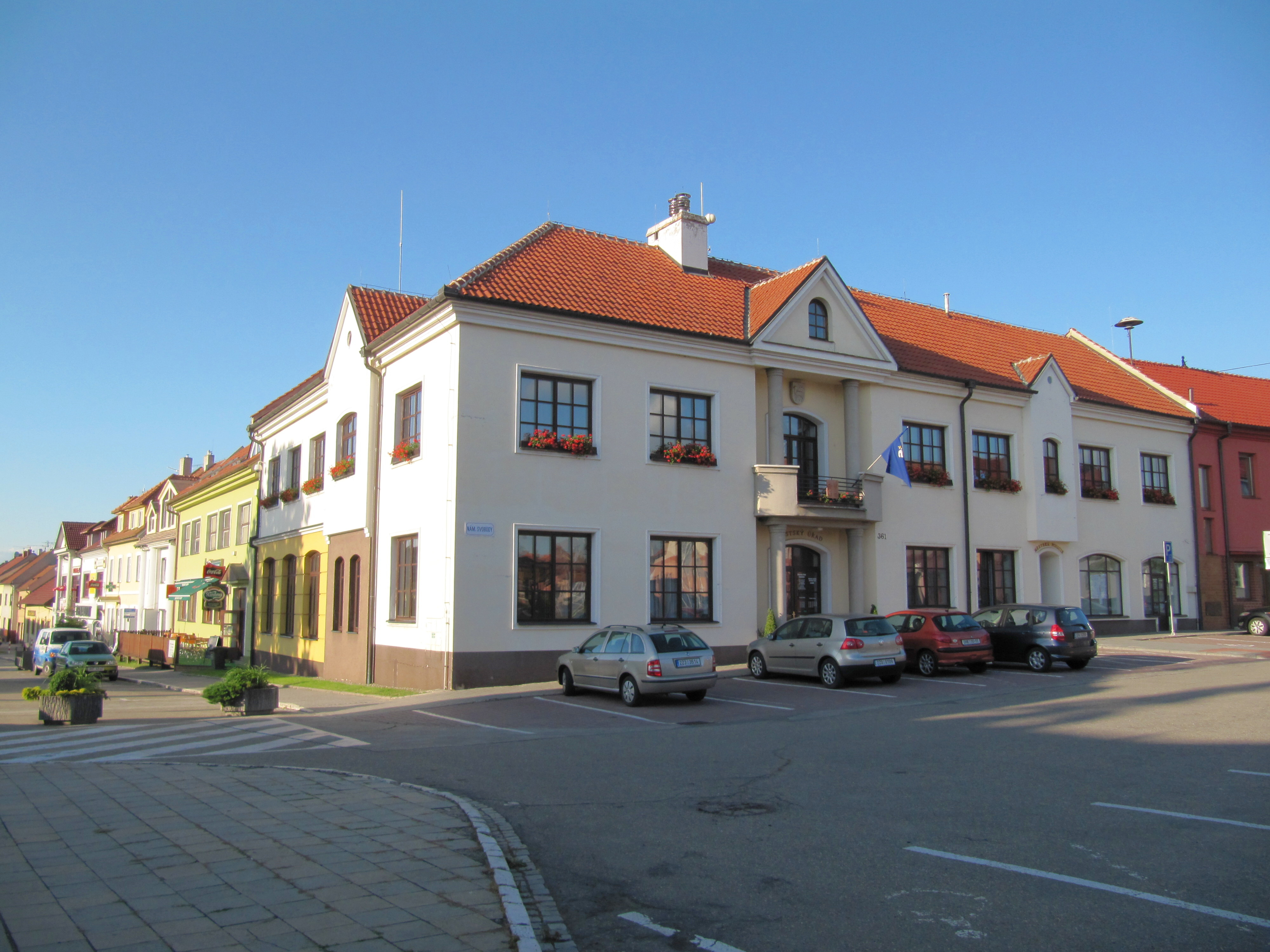
Town hall

Since 1936, the aircraft manufacturer Aircraft Industries (formerly Let Kunovice) has been based at Kunovice Airport near the town. The airport also hosts aircraft manufacturers Czech Sport Aircraft and Evektor-Aerotechnik. It is designated as a private international airport.

The largest Czech producer of refrigerated and durable food, Hamé s.r.o. company owned by the Orkla ASA conglomerate, has its headquarters in Kunovice.

== Transport ==
The town is located at the intersection of two first-class roads: the I/50 road (part of the European route E50) from Brno to the Czech–Slovak border in Starý Hrozenkov and the I/55 road, which connects Olomouc and Zlín with the Czech–Austrian border in Břeclav.

Kunovice served by two train stations on different railway lines. The station Kunovice zastávka is located on the Brno–Staré Město line. The station Kunovice is located on the Staré Město–Bylnice line.

== Sights ==
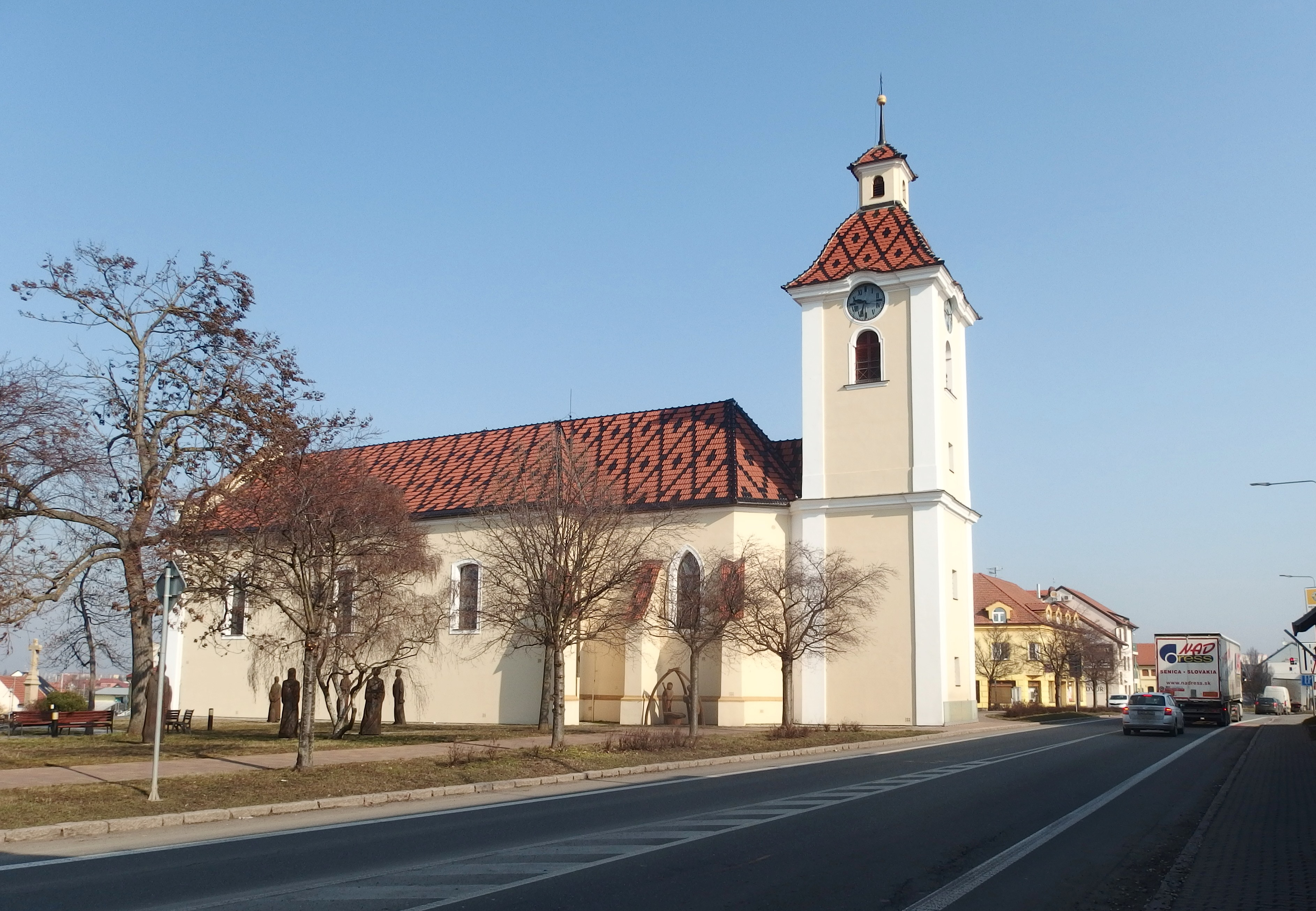
Church of Saints Peter and Paul

The main historical landmark of Kunovice is the Church of Church of Saints Peter and Paul. Its core dates from the 16th century. The church was rebuilt and extended in 1759–1761.

The main tourist attraction is the Kunovice Aviation Museum, located at the town's airport. It was founded in 1970.

== Notable people ==
- Anton Gala (1891–1977), Slovak scientist, ophthalmologist and university professor
- Josef Abrhám (1939–2022), actor; grew up here

== Twin towns – sister cities ==
Kunovice is twinned with:

- Pocheon, South Korea
- Stará Turá, Slovakia
- West, United States
