= Stará Turá =

- Municipality
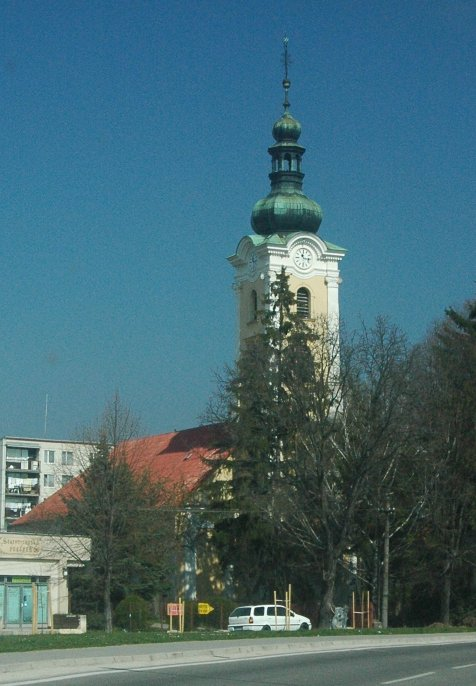
- The catholic church of the Assumption of the Virgin Mary in Stará Turá

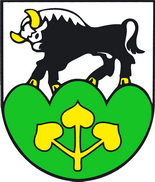
- Flag Coat of arms

- Location of Stará Turá in the Trenčín Region Location of Stará Turá in Slovakia
- Coordinates: 48.78°N 17.70°E
- Country: Slovakia
- Region: Trenčín Region
- District: Nové Mesto nad Váhom District
- First mentioned: 1392

Area
  - Total: 50.94 km^{2} (19.67 sq mi)
- Elevation: 386 m (1,266 ft)

Population (2025)
  - Total: 8,167
- Time zone: UTC+1 (CET)
  - Summer (DST): UTC+2 (CEST)
- Postal code: 916 01
- Area code: +421 32
- Vehicle registration plate (until 2022): NM
- Website: www.staratura.sk

Stará Turá is a town in the Trenčín Region in western Slovakia.

== Geography ==
The municipality lies at an altitude of 386 metres (1,266 ft) and covers an area of 50.94 km^{2} (19.67 sq mi) (2025).

It is located in the Myjava Hills close to the Little Carpathians as well as the White Carpathians. It is situated 11 km (6.84 mi) from Nové Mesto nad Váhom to the west, 12 km (7.46 mi) from Myjava to the east and around 99 km (61.52 mi) from Bratislava to the north.

== History ==
The first written record about Stará Turá was in 1392, as a village belonging to the Čachtice Castle. It was part of it until feudalism ceased to exist in the Austro-Hungarian Empire, the Kingdom of Hungary.

In 1467, Matthias Corvinus promoted Stará Turá to the servile town (oppidum), boosting the town's economy. In 1848, the town was nearly destroyed by fire.

It is mentioned in the popular folk song Teče Voda, Teče.

Before the establishment of independent Czechoslovakia in 1918, Stará Turá was part of Nyitra County within the Kingdom of Hungary. From 1939 to 1945, it was part of the Slovak Republic.

== Population ==
Historical population
| Year | Pop. | ±% |
|---|---|---|
| 1970 | 7,477 | — |
| 1980 | 9,004 | +20.4% |
| 1991 | 10,813 | +20.1% |
| 2001 | 10,291 | −4.8% |
| 2011 | 9,404 | −8.6% |
| 2021 | 8,724 | −7.2% |
Source: Censuses

Population statistic (10 years)
| Year | 1995 | 2005 | 2015 | 2025 |
|---|---|---|---|---|
| Count | 10,626 | 10,003 | 9107 | 8167 |
| Difference | | −5.86% | −8.95% | −10.32% |

Population statistic
| Year | 2024 | 2025 |
|---|---|---|
| Count | 8259 | 8167 |
| Difference | | −1.11% |

It has a population of 8167 people (31 December 2025).

=== Ethnicity ===
Census 2021 (1+ %)
| Ethnicity | Number | Fraction |
|---|---|---|
| Slovak | 8106 | 92.91% |
| Not found out | 539 | 6.17% |
| Czech | 139 | 1.59% |
| Total | 8724 | |

In year 2021 was 8724 people by ethnicity 8106 as Slovak, 539 as Not found out, 139 as Czech, 27 as Other, 14 as Hungarian, 8 as Polish, 8 as Moravian, 6 as Rusyn, 6 as Russian, 5 as German, 5 as English, 3 as Serbian, 3 as Croatian, 2 as Chinese, 2 as Ukrainian, 2 as Romani, 2 as Greek, 1 as Irish, 1 as Italian, 1 as Romanian, 1 as Canadian, 1 as Bulgarian and 1 as Albanian.

Note on population: The difference values of population numbers in the table "Population statistic" and in the sections "Ethnicity" & "Religion" is caused by the use of various statistical methods.

=== Religion ===
Census 2021 (1+ %)
| Religion | Number | Fraction |
|---|---|---|
| None | 3161 | 36.23% |
| Evangelical Church | 2808 | 32.19% |
| Roman Catholic Church | 1805 | 20.69% |
| Not found out | 629 | 7.21% |
| Total | 8724 | |

In year 2021 was 8724 people by religion 3161 from None, 2808 from Evangelical Church, 1805 from Roman Catholic Church, 629 from Not found out, 52 from Ad hoc movements, 46 from Church of the Brethren, 40 from Greek Catholic Church, 33 from Jehovah's Witnesses, 26 from United Methodist Church, 23 from Other and not ascertained christian church, 20 from Other, 20 from Seventh-day Adventist Church, 18 from Buddhism, 13 from Eastern Orthodox Church, 11 from Apostolic Church, 4 from Calvinist Church, 4 from Christian Congregations in Slovakia, 3 from Old Catholic Church, 3 from Paganism and natural spirituality, 1 from Jewish community, 1 from Islam, 1 from Hinduism, 1 from Czechoslovak Hussite Church and 1 from Baptists Church.

== Education ==
Secondary Industrial School is located in the city.

== Notable people ==
- Viliam Vagač (1909–1970), SDB, Roman Catholic priest and religious prisoner (sentenced to 18 years in prison).

== Twin towns – sister cities ==
Stará Turá is twinned with:

- Kunovice, Czech Republic
