= Aviation in Maryland =

- Aviation in the United States
- Maryland State Flag

Airports
- Commercial – primary: 2
- Commercial – non-primary: 1
- General aviation: 9
- Other public-use airports: 17
- Military and other airports: 5

First flight
- 1784 - Hot air balloon; 1850 - Dirigible; 1909 - Heavier than air

Maryland's first aeronautical event was the flight of 13-year-old Edward Warren from Baltimore in Peter Carne's tethered hot air balloon in 1784.

== Events ==
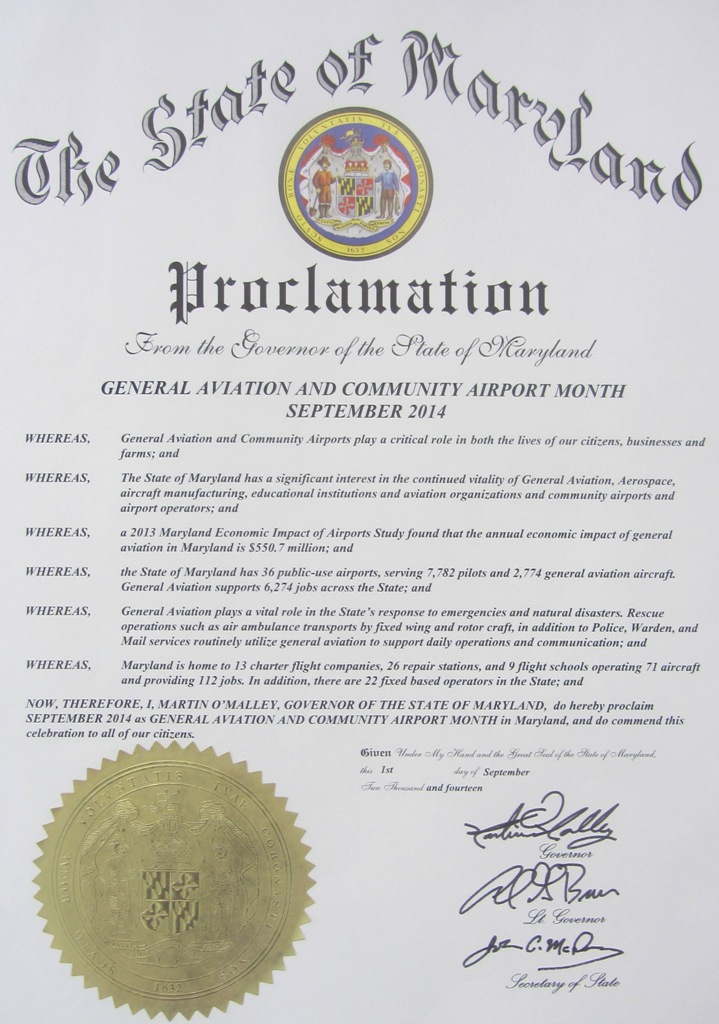
Proclamation that September 2014 is the General Aviation and Community Airport Month

- 1908 Lincoln Beachy demonstrates a dirigible over Baltimore from Electric Park
- 1909 On 9 October, Wilbur Wright demonstrated "Miss Columbia", the first U.S. Government aircraft, on five flights.
- 1909 On 22 October, Charles Elvers flies the first aircraft built in Maryland, a modified self-made Curtiss pusher style at Owings Mills.
- 1909 On 29 October, 28-year-old Sara Van Deman becomes the first woman to fly in a powered aircraft with Wilbur Wright at College Park.
- 1911 The Army Signal Corps Aviation School is founded in College Park.
- 1911 On 7 September, John Rodgers completes the first flight of a U.S. Naval aircraft from Farragut Field.
- 1912 Lieutenant Alfred Austell Cunningham reported to the Naval Aviation Camp in Annapolis, Maryland, starting Marine aviation.
- 1922 The Berliner Helicopter makes a controlled flight of a helicopter at College Park. The 1922 flights of the Berliner and the de Bothezat H1 were the first by manned helicopters.
- 1925 Jimmy Doolittle beats a British Gloster III in the Schneider Trophy race held at Baltimore Bay Shore amusement park. The sole Supermarine S.4 crashed in trials prior to the race.
- 1927 Charles Lindbergh lands the Spirit of St. Louis at Baltimore's Logan Field
- 1927 Van Lear Black, Chairman of the Baltimore Sun starts record setting international charters in the Fokker named "Maryland Free State".
- 1940 Howard University is one of four schools chosen for training African American pilots for the Civilian Pilot Training Program in Croome.
- 1947 University of Maryland considers opening a regional airport.
- 1969 A State Economic Development Study looks into a second major airport to supplement Baltimore Washington International to accommodate supersonic aircraft.
- 1996 Nathan "Bill" Morris, founder of Kentmorr Airpark, passes away at 98. He was one of the world's oldest active pilots at 98 years old.
- 2001 The September 11 attacks, caused the formation of the Washington Air Defense Identification Zone, temporarily closing, then permanently restricting air operations over central Maryland.
- 2011 The University of Maryland Gamera Human Powered Helicopter made an attempt at the Sikorsky Prize for human powered helicopter flight.
- 2014 Haysfield Airport closes to build a housing development.
- 2014 September 2014 is proclaimed by the governor to be "General Aviation and Community Airport Month".

== Aircraft Manufacturers ==
- Allied Aviation, Cockeysville, Maryland. Built the Allied Aviation LRA flying boat-glider in World War II.
- Berliner-Joyce Aircraft, Dundalk, Maryland 1929–1933. Built the Berliner-Joyce P-16 fighter, the company was bought by North American Aviation.
- Brown Aeronautical Company, Curtiss Bay Maryland, 1910–1911. Built the "Lord Baltimore I & II" amphibious aircraft.
- Curtiss-Caproni, Dundalk, Maryland 1929–1930. Built a 200,000 sq ft factory to produce Caproni aircraft, but folded into Curtiss-Wright without any production.
- Custer Channel Wing Corporation, Hagerstown, Maryland 1951–1970. Built several STOL prototype aircraft using the Willard Ray Custer's channel wing concept.
- Doyle Aero Corporation, Baltimore, Maryland 1928–1929. Built the Doyle Aero O-2 Oriole biplane, and was bought in 1929 by Detroit Aircraft Corporation.
- Engineering and Research Corporation, Riverdale, Maryland 1930–1947. Built over 6,000 Ercoupe light planes.
- Fairchild Aircraft, Hagerstown, Maryland 1929–1984. Maker of civilian and military aircraft such as the Fairchild C-123 Provider.
- General Aviation Manufacturing Corporation, 1931–1934. Built the YO-27 in an unused Curtiss Caproni Corporation plant at Logan field and the 700 hp model 34. The General Motors subsidiary was sold to North American Aviation in 1933.
- Kreider-Reisner, Hagerstown, Maryland 1923–1929. Produced light biplanes, purchased by Fairchild Aircraft in 1929.
- Glenn L. Martin Company, now Lockheed Martin, Middle River, Maryland 1928–1961. Production included the Martin Maryland, Martin Baltimore, and 4,056 B-26 Bombers.
- Maryland Pressed Steel Company, 1915–1920. Produced the Bellanca CD, and Bellanca CE biplanes in Hagerstown, Maryland.
- North American Aviation. Built the prototype North American NA-16 trainer at the former Berliner-Joyce factory in Dundalk.
- Rex Smith Aeroplane Company, College Park, Maryland, 1910–1916. Built the Rex Smith Biplane, with many early demonstrations in the Washington D.C. area.

== Aerospace ==
- American Propeller and Manufacturing Company, in Baltimore. Manufactured 75 percent of all propellers used by America in World War I.
- Avemco,(1961–) part of HCC Insurance Holdings, is Headquartered in Frederick. A provider of aviation insurance.
- Lockheed Martin, an international defense contractor is headquartered in Bethesda.
- Maryland Aviation Company 1911–1911, formed in 1911.
- Martin Marietta, 1961–1995. The merger of Martin Company and American-Marietta Corporation, headquartered in Bethesda. Bought by Lockheed Martin in 1991.
- Frank G. Schenuit Rubber Company, In Baltimore, Maryland. Manufactured automotive tires since 1912, entering the aircraft tire business in World War II through the 1960s.

== Airports ==
- College Park Airport is the world's oldest continuously operated airport.
- Columbia Air Center was an airfield in Croom, Maryland, operated from 1941 to 1958. It was started by African American pilots who were not permitted to use other airports, but was also open to whites.
- List of Airports in Maryland

== Commercial Service ==
- The Baltimore Airways Company operated daily flights in the late 1920s from Park Heights, Baltimore to New York.
- Baltimore/Washington International Thurgood Marshall Airport provides air service with 277,662 operations annually. BWI is served by most major carriers, with Southwest Airlines as the prime carrier with over 50% of passenger volume.
- Hagerstown Maryland based Henson Airlines became Piedmont Airlines. The commuter airline is now based at Salisbury, Maryland, with a fleet of 44 aircraft.
- Chesapeake Airways began service to Baltimore began on April 5, 1946, in C-47 aircraft. The service continued until 1949.
- Washington Airlines became FAA's first approved instance of a STOL airline service in 1969 between Baltimore and Washington National and Dulles.

== Organizations ==
- Aircraft Owners and Pilots Association is headquartered in Frederick, Maryland.

== Government and Military ==
- All flight operations in Maryland are conducted within FAA oversight.
- The Maryland Aviation Administration maintains state regulations, and owns and operates Baltimore/Washington International Thurgood Marshall Airport.
- The Maryland State Police Aviation command operates 12 Eurocopter Dauphin helicopters, 1 Beechcraft B300 King Air 350, and 1 Cessna P210N Pressurized Centurion for medivac and prisoner transport. In 2013, Maryland started replacing the Dauphin fleet with 10 AgustaWestland AW139 helicopters.
- Several Maryland cities and counties operate helicopter units. This includes Anne Arundel County 1 Bell 407, 2 Bell OH-58 Kiowa, Baltimore City "foxtrot" unit 1 Eurocopter EC120, Baltimore County 3 Eurocopter AS350B3, Howard County 1 Bell 407, Prince George's County 2 MD520N, Harford County 1 Bell OH-58.
- The Maryland Air National Guard was founded June 29, 1921. On that date the 104th Observation Squadron was federally recognized in Baltimore.
- NASA's Goddard Space Flight Center builds spacecraft, instruments and new technology to study the Earth, the sun, solar system, and the universe.
- The Joint Base Andrews Naval Air Facility opened in 1942 as Camp Springs Air Base in Prince George's County, Maryland. The base houses dozens of units serving the metro Washington. D.C. area. Most notably, the 89th Airlift wing, supporting the Boeing VC-25, "Air Force One" when occupied by the President of the United States.

== Museums ==
- Baltimore–Washington International Airport has a gallery with aircraft cut-aways and Maryland Aviation History.
- College Park Aviation Museum in College Park, Maryland.
- Glenn L. Martin Maryland Aviation Museum in Middle River, Maryland.
- Hagerstown Aviation Museum, in Hagerstown, Maryland
- Massey Air Museum, Massey, Maryland
- NASA Goddard Space Flight Center visitors center Greenbelt, Maryland
- Paul E. Garber Preservation, Restoration, and Storage Facility Silver Hill, Maryland
- Patuxent River Naval Air Museum, Lexington Park, Maryland

== Gallery ==
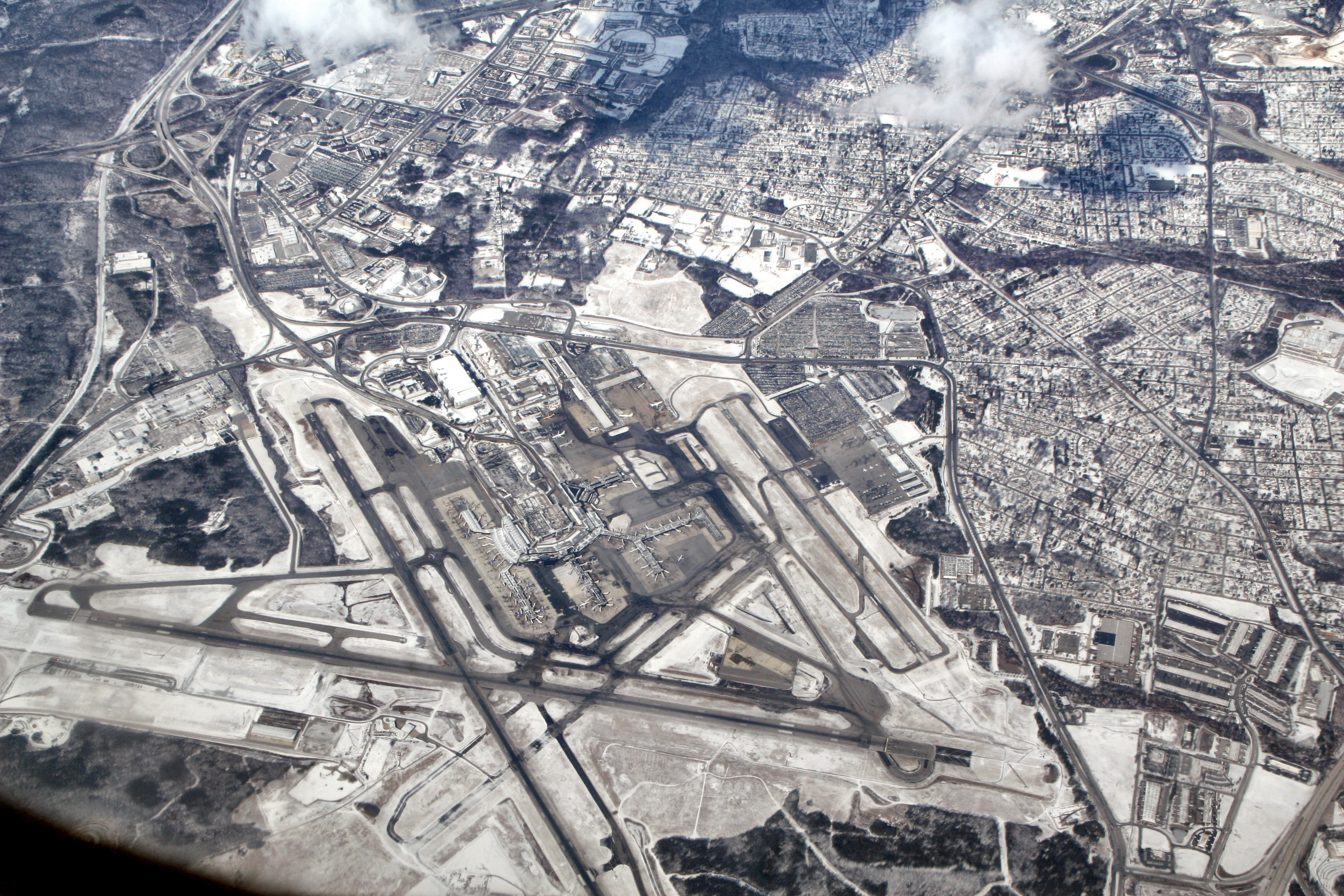
BWI Airport

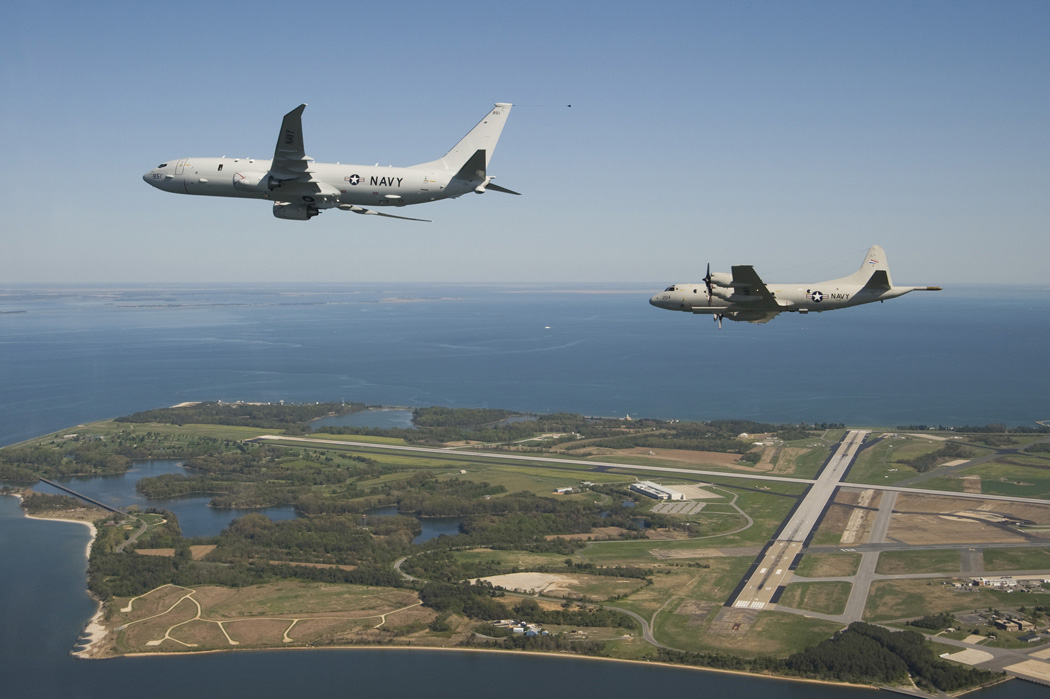
Patuxent River NAS

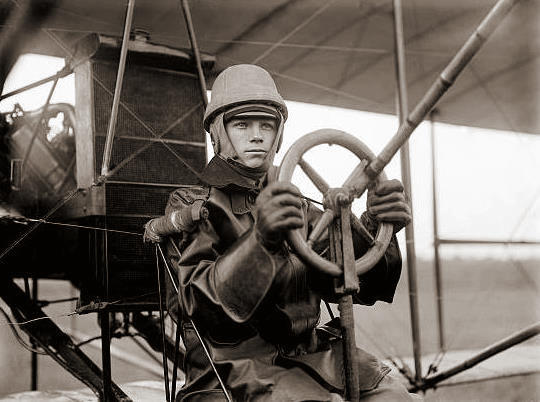
Curtiss aircraft at College Park

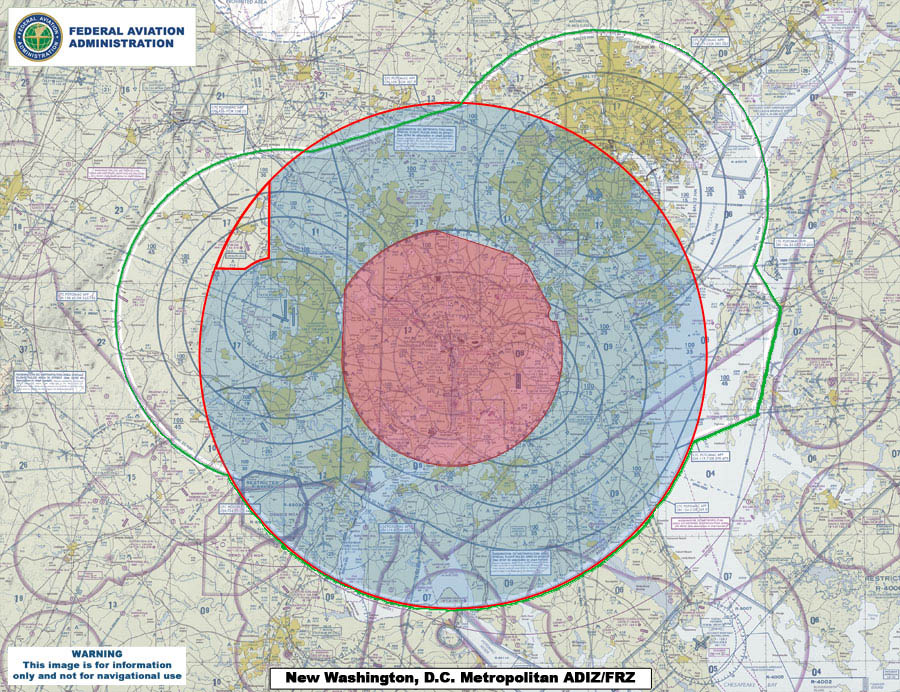
Post 9/11 airspace
