= Custer CCW-5 =

1953 twin-engined, five-seat, channel wing, pusher configuration aircraft

CCW-5
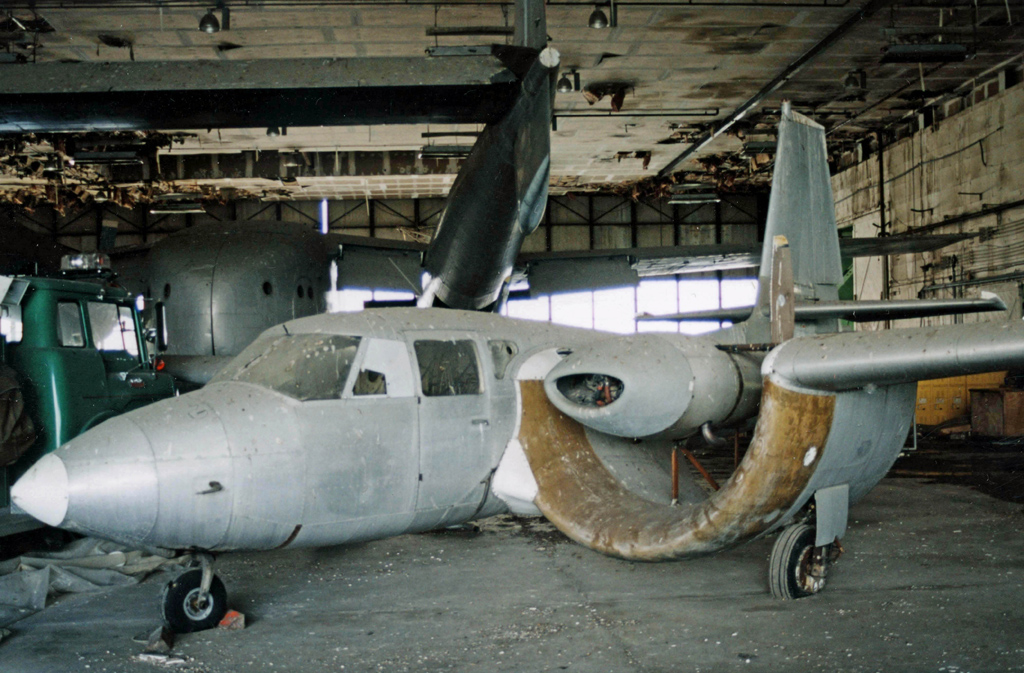

General information
- Type: 5-seat light transport
- National origin: United States
- Manufacturer: Custer Channel Wing Corporation, Hagerstown, Maryland
- Number built: 2

History
- First flight: 13 July 1953

The Custer CCW-5 is a twin-engined, 5-seat aircraft of pusher configuration, which used a channel wing claimed to enable low speed flight and short take-offs. Two CCW-5s flew, eleven years apart, but the type never entered production.

The aircraft was the third and last of a series of Custer Channel Wing designs.

== Design and development ==
In most situations an aircraft's lift comes chiefly from the low pressure generated on the upper surface by the locally enhanced higher air velocity. This latter may be the result of the movement of the aircraft through the air or, when lift at low air speeds is important for short take-off performance, produced by engine power. The channel wing, the brainchild of Willard Ray Custer, is an example of the latter, where the air velocity over the upper surface velocity in a U-shaped channel formed out of the wing was increased with a pusher propeller at the trailing edge. This near semi-circular channel laterally constrained the airflow produced by the propeller, even when the aircraft was at rest, producing higher flow velocities than over a conventional pusher wing. The need for wing mounted pusher engines made a pusher twin a natural configuration, and for his third channel wing design Custer chose to modify the existing Baumann Brigadier, a 5-seat mid wing pusher twin which itself did not reach production.

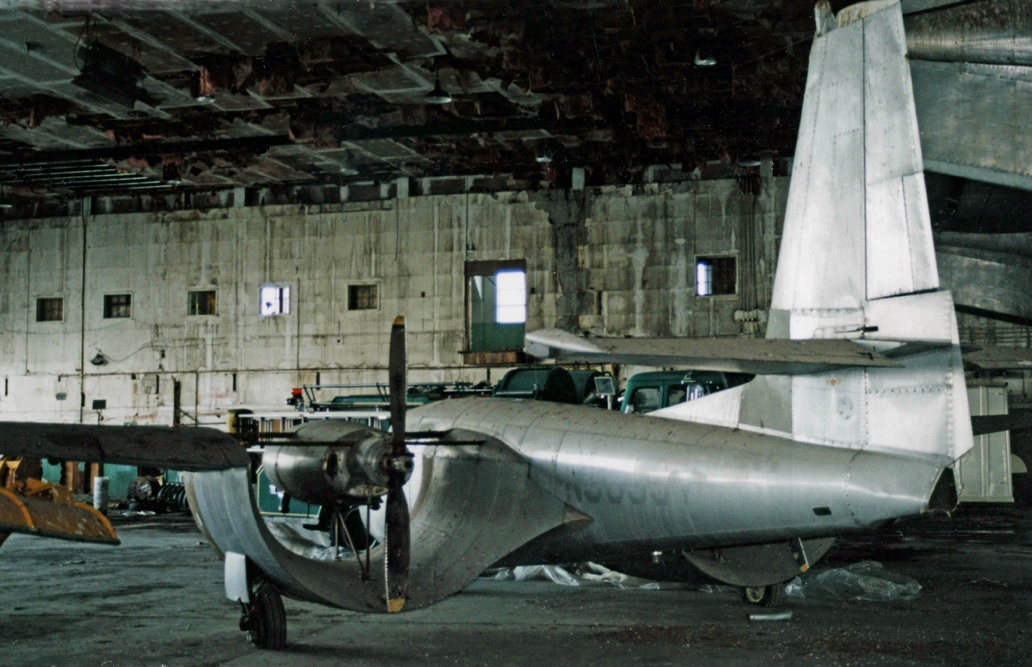
Rear view taken in 2004 of the second CCW-5 showing the fixing of the pusher engine within the wing channels.

The CCW-5 retained the fuselage and empennage of the Brigadier, but replaced the whole center section with a pair of channels, starting at roots in the lower part of the fuselage. Only beyond the channels did the conventional wings regain their mid-wing configuration. A 225 hp (168 kW) Continental O-470 flat six engine was mounted on slender vertical and horizontal struts at the center of each the channels, on the mid-wing line. These drove constant speed pusher propellers. The main undercarriage was much shortened by mounting its legs on the outer part of the channel section; the Brigadier nosewheel was retained.

The first of two CCW-5s flew on 13 July 1953 and was piloted by Walker Davidson at Oxnard, California. It was reported to have completed its test flying by autumn 1956, when production was scheduled to begin. This did not happen, though a second aircraft flew in June 1964. The delay was partly the result of financial problems. The CCW-5 performed well below the original estimates with a maximum achieved speed of 220 mph (350 km/h) compared with an estimated 300 mph (480 km/h). It was claimed that the aircraft could fly under control at 11 mph (18 km/h) and that it could take off with a 1,500 pounds (680 kg) load at 70% power in 90 ft (27 m).

The second CCW-5 was finished in 1964 with 260 hp (194 kW) Continental IO-470P engines; it survives and is under restoration at the Mid-Atlantic Air Museum, Reading, Pennsylvania.

== Specifications ==
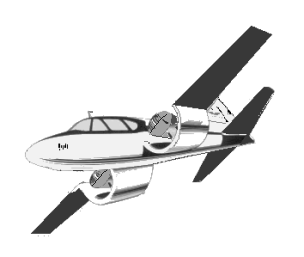
CCW-5

Data from Jane's All the World's Aircraft

General characteristics

- Crew: 1
- Capacity: 4 passengers
- Length: 28 ft 8.5 in (8.750 m)
- Wingspan: 41 ft 2 in (12.55 m)
- Height: 10 ft 10 in (3.30 m)
- Airfoil: root: NACA 4418; tip: NACA 4412
- Empty weight: 3,000 lb (1,361 kg) design weight
- Gross weight: 5,400 lb (2,449 kg) design weight
- Fuel capacity: 200 US gal (757 L; 166 Imp gal)
- Maximum gross weight: 6,000 pounds (2,700 kg)
- Landing speed: 15 mph (24 km/h)
- Landing and take-off distances: 100 ft (30 m)
- Powerplant: 2 × Continental O-470-A flat 6-cylinder air-cooled, 225 hp (168 kW) each

Performance

- Maximum speed: 220 mph (350 km/h, 190 kn)
- Cruise speed: 180 mph (290 km/h, 160 kn)
- Range: 1,680 mi (2,700 km, 1,460 nmi)
- Service ceiling: 20,000 ft (6,100 m)
- Rate of climb: 3,000 ft/min (15 m/s) .

== See also ==
Aircraft of comparable role, configuration, and era

- Antonov 181
