= PA21 =

PA21 may refer to:

- Pennsylvania Route 21
- Pennsylvania's 21st congressional district
- Piper PA-21, an aircraft prototype
- Pitcairn PA-21, an autogyro of the 1930s
