= Rhein-Flugzeugbau RF-1 =

RF-1
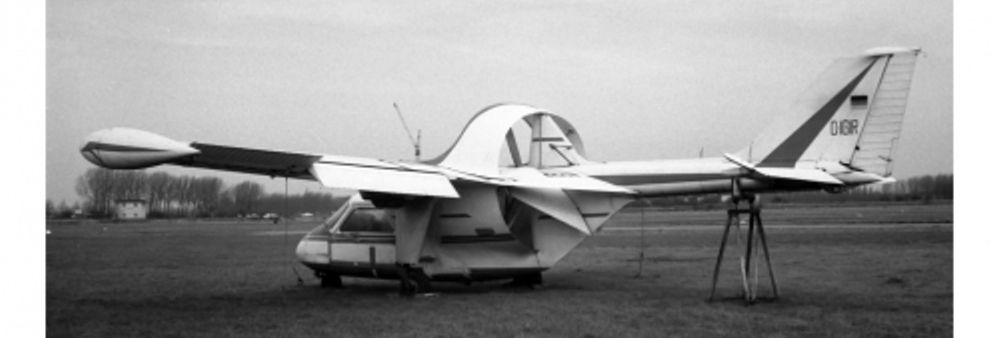

General information
- Type: Experimental aircraft
- National origin: Germany
- Manufacturer: Rhein Flugzeugbau GmbH
- Designer: Hanno Fischer
- Number built: 1

History
- First flight: 15 August 1960

The Rhein-Flugzeugbau RF-1 was a prototype channel wing aircraft.

== Design and development ==
The RF-1 is a modification of the channel wing concept, that uses a single channel and propeller to eliminate the asymmetrical lift issues with a twin channel wing design. The "channel" is an airfoil-shaped section along the lower arc of the rearward propeller that produces additional lift from the propwash. The RF-1's propeller was completely shrouded, creating a hybrid ducted propeller. Twin engine redundancy is maintained with multiple engines driving a central propeller with freewheeling clutches to allow for an engine failure.

The aircraft had the unique shape to facilitate a channel wing design. The fuselage was composed of welded steel tubing with a composite skin. The landing gear was electrically retractable.

== Operational history ==
The prototype was built at Krefeld/Mönchengladbach and was only flown once.

== Variants ==
RF-1 V1
The original prototype
RF-1 V2
A modified prototype that did not go into production. Changes included 275 hp (205 kW) engines.

== Specifications (Rhein-Flugzeugbau RF-1) ==
Data from Flight

General characteristics

- Capacity: 6
- Length: 13.08 m (42 ft 11 in)
- Wingspan: 14.1 m (46 ft 3 in)
- Height: 3.8 m (12 ft 6 in)
- Wing area: 32.53 m^{2} (350.2 sq ft)
- Empty weight: 1,800 kg (3,968 lb)
- Max takeoff weight: 2,700 kg (5,952 lb)
- Fuel capacity: 360
- Powerplant: 2 × Lycoming O-540-A1A , 190 kW (250 hp) each

Performance

- Maximum speed: 290 km/h (180 mph, 160 kn)
- Cruise speed: 260 km/h (160 mph, 140 kn)
- Range: 750 km (470 mi, 400 nmi)
- Service ceiling: 6,200 m (20,300 ft)

== See also ==
Related development

- Custer Channel Wing
