= Channel wing =

Aircraft wing design

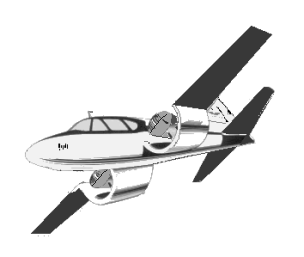
Channel Wing aircraft CCW-5

The channel wing is an aircraft wing principle that places an engine in the middle of a half-tube driving a propeller placed at the rear end of the channel formed by the half-tube. It was developed by Willard Ray Custer in the 1920s.

The basic idea is to use a ducted fan to increase the velocity of the airflow as it passes through the duct. Normally the duct it circular, but by cutting away the upper part the resulting lift from the high-velocity air produces lift upward only. It shares some features with the coleopter, which uses a circular duct to produce a true VTOL aircraft.

Although channel wing aircraft demonstrated improved takeoff and landing performance, they had several drawbacks and were never widely used. A significant issue is that there is no way to "turn off" the lift as long as the engine is running; in the case of a single-engine failure on a twin-engine plane, this leads to dramatically more lift on one wing than the other, making it very difficult to control. It also introduces a challenging mechanical design which generally leads to higher weights.

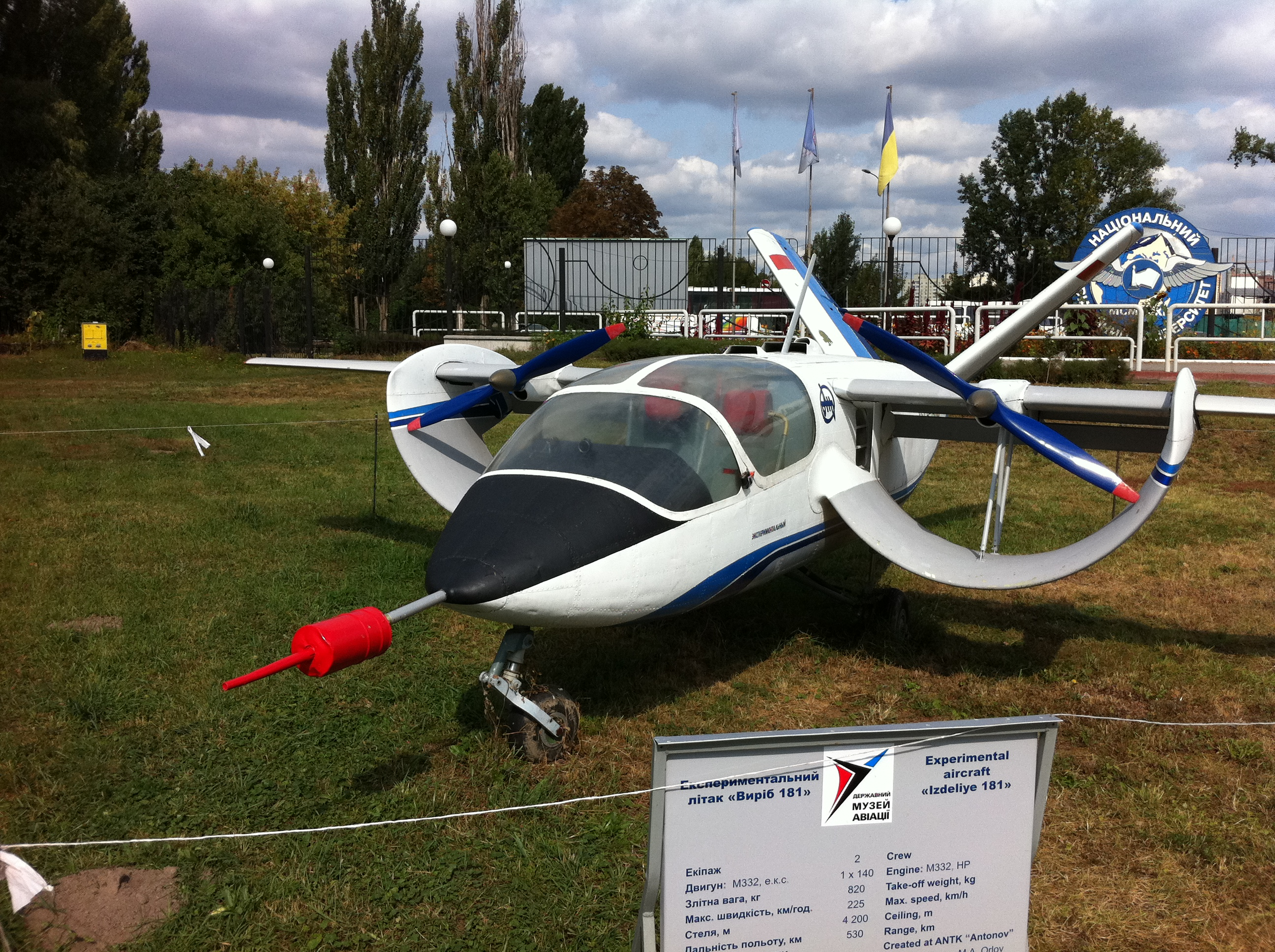
Antonov Izdeliye 181 Experimental

== Development ==
In 1925, Custer had observed how strong winds had lifted the roof of a barn. Custer realized that the high velocity of the wind created a lower pressure above the roof while the pressure remained high inside, literally blowing the roof off. This low pressure above/high pressure below is the same phenomenon that allows an airplane wing to provide lift.

Custer studied the phenomenon, and by 1928 had made the first models of a wing with a half-tube section instead of the usual wing profile. He patented the idea in 1929. The half-tube channel wing was then refined further, and on November 12, 1942, the CCW-1 (Custer Channel Wing 1) airplane flew for the first time. Custer built additional experimental aircraft; the last one was CCW-5, of which a few were manufactured in 1964.

== Operating principle ==
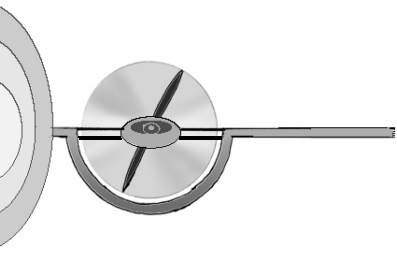
Sketch of channel wing (seen from front)

Custer's summary of his invention was that the lift created by a wing is the velocity of the stream of air passing over the wing, not the velocity of the airplane itself: the speed of air, not the airspeed.

A wing functions because the air over the wing has a lower pressure than the air under it. The conventional aircraft must reach a significant minimum speed before this pressure differential become large enough that it generates sufficient lift to become airborne.

In Custer's channel wing the rotating propeller directs a stable stream of air backwards through the channel. A propeller at the low pressure side is normally be supplied by air from all directions. Since the half-tube prevents air from being drawn from below, the air moves through the channel instead. This creates a low pressure area in the channel, which generates lift.

== Applications ==
The channel wing was not proven in an aircraft for a long time, though Custer showed theoretically and experimentally the principle of vertical flight. His designs were built with conventional rudders that required some airspeed to be functional, so none of the aircraft designed by Custer were capable of vertical takeoff, but instead were characterized as STOL (short takeoff and landing). The required runway for takeoff was remarkably short: 200 feet (61 m) for the CCW-1, 66 feet (20 m) for the CCW-2, with a take off speed of as low as 20 miles per hour (32 km/h). Full vertical takeoff is theoretically feasible.

Custer investigated aircraft with pure channel wings and aircraft with additional conventional wings located outside the channels. The construction functions very well at relatively low speeds. At higher speeds, at high propeller RPM, oscillations occurred in the areas around the propeller, causing increased noise as well as creating long term destructive vibrations in the structure.

The twin engine layout featuring two channel wing features was the most tested configuration. The twin layout had a higher risk of loss of control during a single engine failure situation, and required a high nose up attitude for STOL flight.

Two of Custer's CCW aircraft survive. CCW-1 is located at the Smithsonian's National Air & Space Museum in Suitland, Maryland. CCW-5, which was based on the Baumann Brigadier executive aircraft, is exhibited at the Mid-Atlantic Air Museum in Pennsylvania.

Later, research performed by NASA concluded that the advantage in lift and field length performance achieved did not offset the layout's many deficiencies in climb and high speed ability, and identified problems meeting certification requirements for general aviation. The main issue is that the semi-circular beam wing configuration incurs increased profile drag and weight penalties over a conventional wing of the same lifting planform, and a common straight wing could provide almost the equivalent lift enhancement when exposed to the same slipstream-induced increased dynamic pressure.

=== Hybrids ===
From 1999–2004 a joint research project led by Georgia Institute of Technology Research Institute was funded by Langley Research Center. Aircraft were tested using channel wing layouts with circulation control devices that leveraged the Coandă effect. Performance improved and angle of attack was lowered. The resultant design is patented.

=== VTOL ===
In 2017, aerospace startup Hop Flyt Inc. was founded around the concept of eVTOL aircraft that use channel wing technology to achieve vertical flight. The flagship aircraft Venturi, named after the Venturi Effect, is a conceptual canard aircraft that allows the angle of incidence of the channel wing to vary, enabling the aircraft to achieve hover, transition, and fixed wing flight. A patent was issued in 2020. The company targets the remote resupply market. It claims that its unmanned aerial vehicle offers 90% lower operational cost and 50-fold CO_{2} reductions in a VTOL with an 800 mile range and 250 lb payload.

== Examples ==
Prototype aircraft
Model	Designer	Company	approximate year
CCW-1	Willard Ray Custer	Custer Channel Wing Corporation	1942
CCW-2	Willard Ray Custer	Custer Channel Wing Corporation	1948
CCW-5	Willard Ray Custer	Custer Channel Wing Corporation	1953–64
RFV-1	Hanno Fischer	Rhein-Flugzeugbau, Mönchengladbach	1960
Antonov 181	Oleg Antonov	Antonov	1990
Cyclone	Neil Winston	HopFlyt	2026
