= G Elias & Brother =

American Aircraft Manufacturer

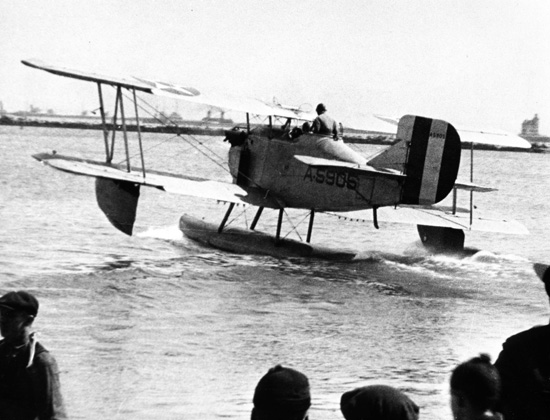
- Founded: circa 1920
- Defunct: 1929
- Headquarters: Buffalo, New York
- Key people: A.G. Elias & E.J Elias
- Products: Commercial aircraft

G Elias & Brother was an American manufacturer of cabinets and aircraft based in Buffalo, New York in the 1920s. A.G. Elias sat on the Manufacturers Aircraft Association's board of directors along with President Frank H. Russell, VP Glenn L. Martin, Charles L. Laurence, Chance M. Vought, S.S. Bradley, George P. Tidmarsh, and Donald Douglas. E.J Elias promoted the construction of a Buffalo municipal airport to aid the local fledgling airplane industry of five aviation companies constructing airplanes and airplane parts. From 1920 to 1925, Elias company's chief engineer, David Earle Dunlap (1896-1957), designed the Elias EM-2 Expeditionary planes. He designed the NBS-3 bomber fuselage and the Elias M-1 Mail plane. Dunlap's Elias TA-1 design was the first United States Army Air Corps Trainer to have a radial engine. After tests a McCook Field, the Army Air Corps selected other manufacturers over the Elias bomber and trainer. The company designed the Elias EM-1 to meet requirements for a multirole amphibian marine expeditionary aircraft. Elias delivered six production Elias EM-2 aircraft with Liberty engines to the United States Navy in 1922.

== Aircraft ==
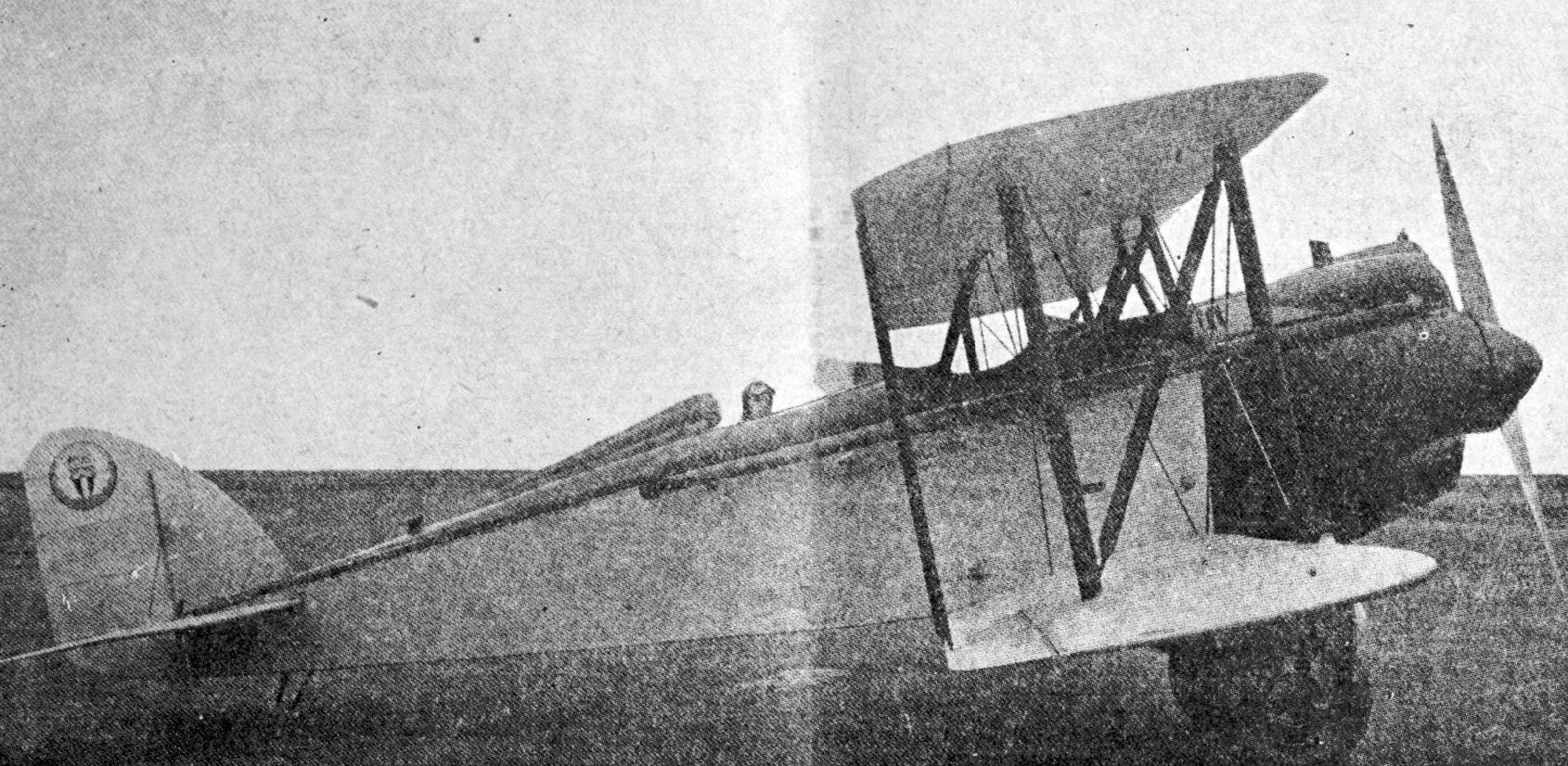
Elias Airmobile

- Elias Airmobile
- Elias AJE Air Express
- Elias EC-1 Aircoupe
- Elias EM
- Elias EO
- Elias ES-1
- Elias M-1 Mailplane
- Elias TA-1
- Elias XNBS-3

== Gallery ==
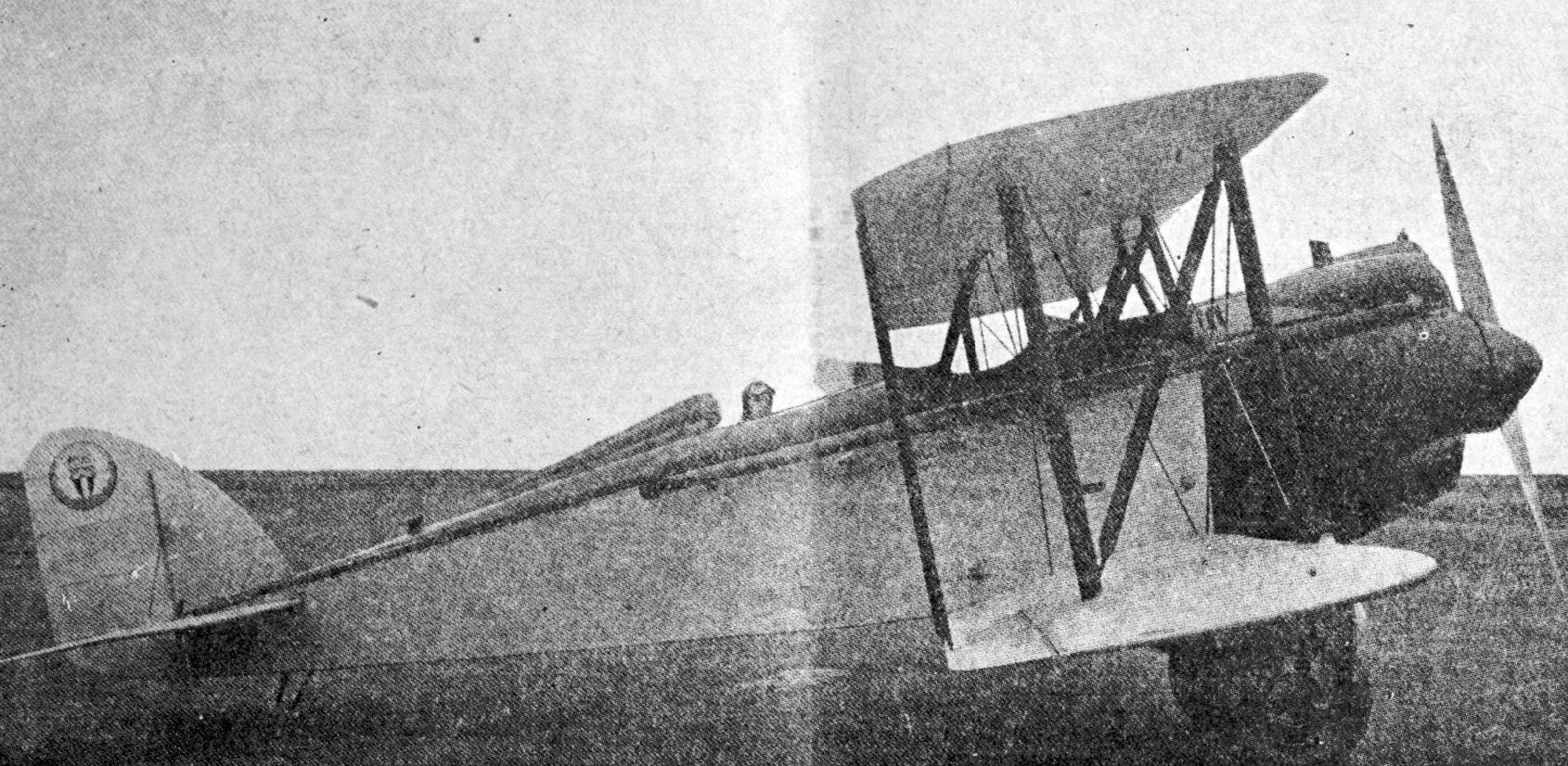
Elias Airmobile

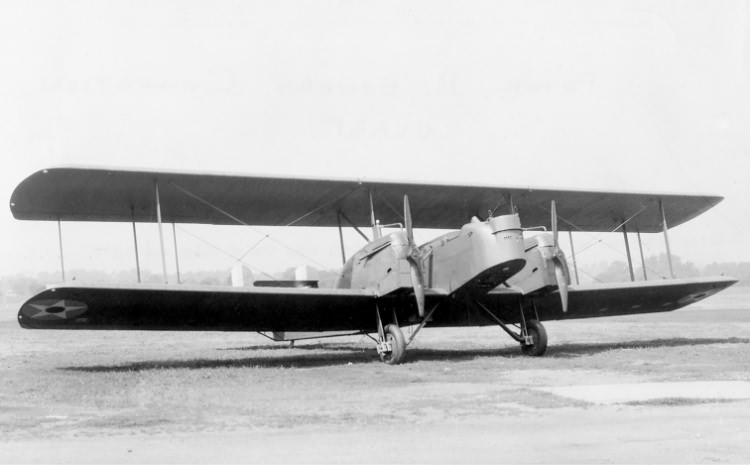
XNBS-3

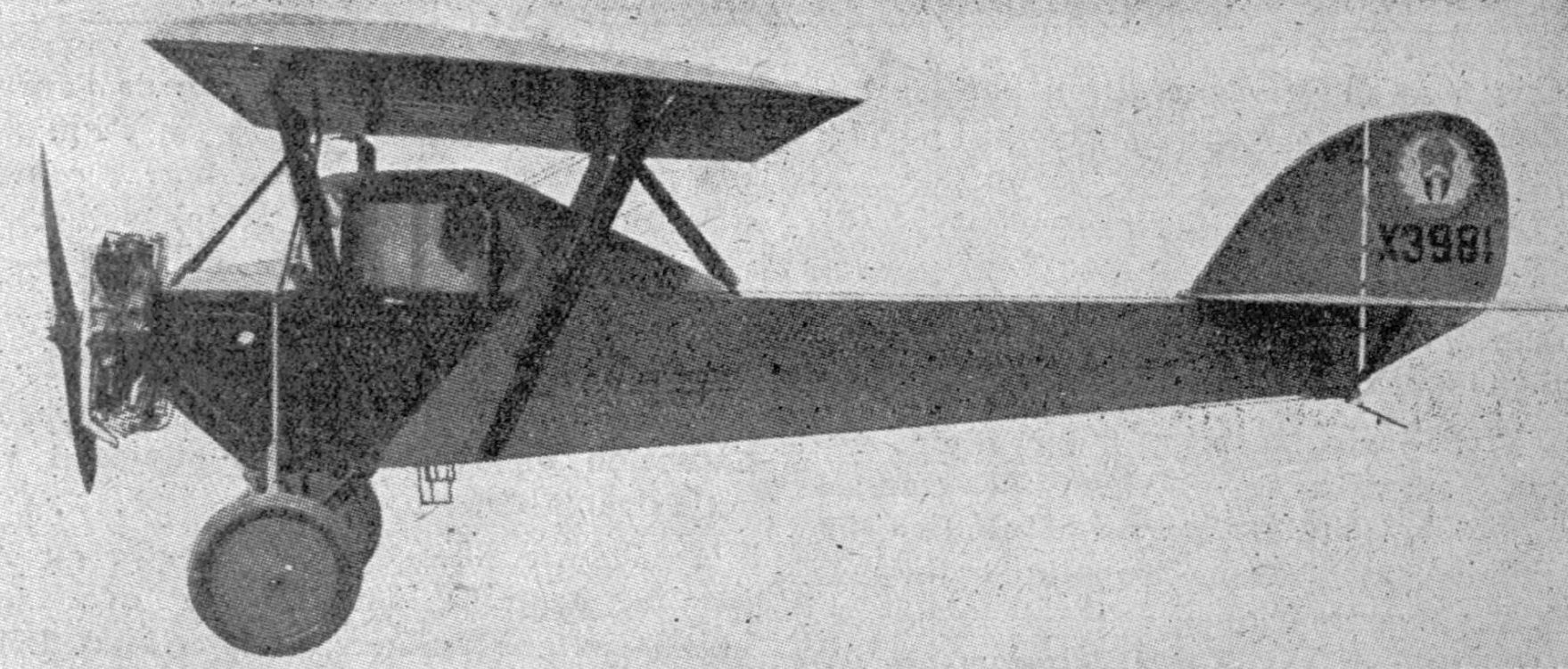
Elias Aircoupe left side Le Document aéronautique March,1929

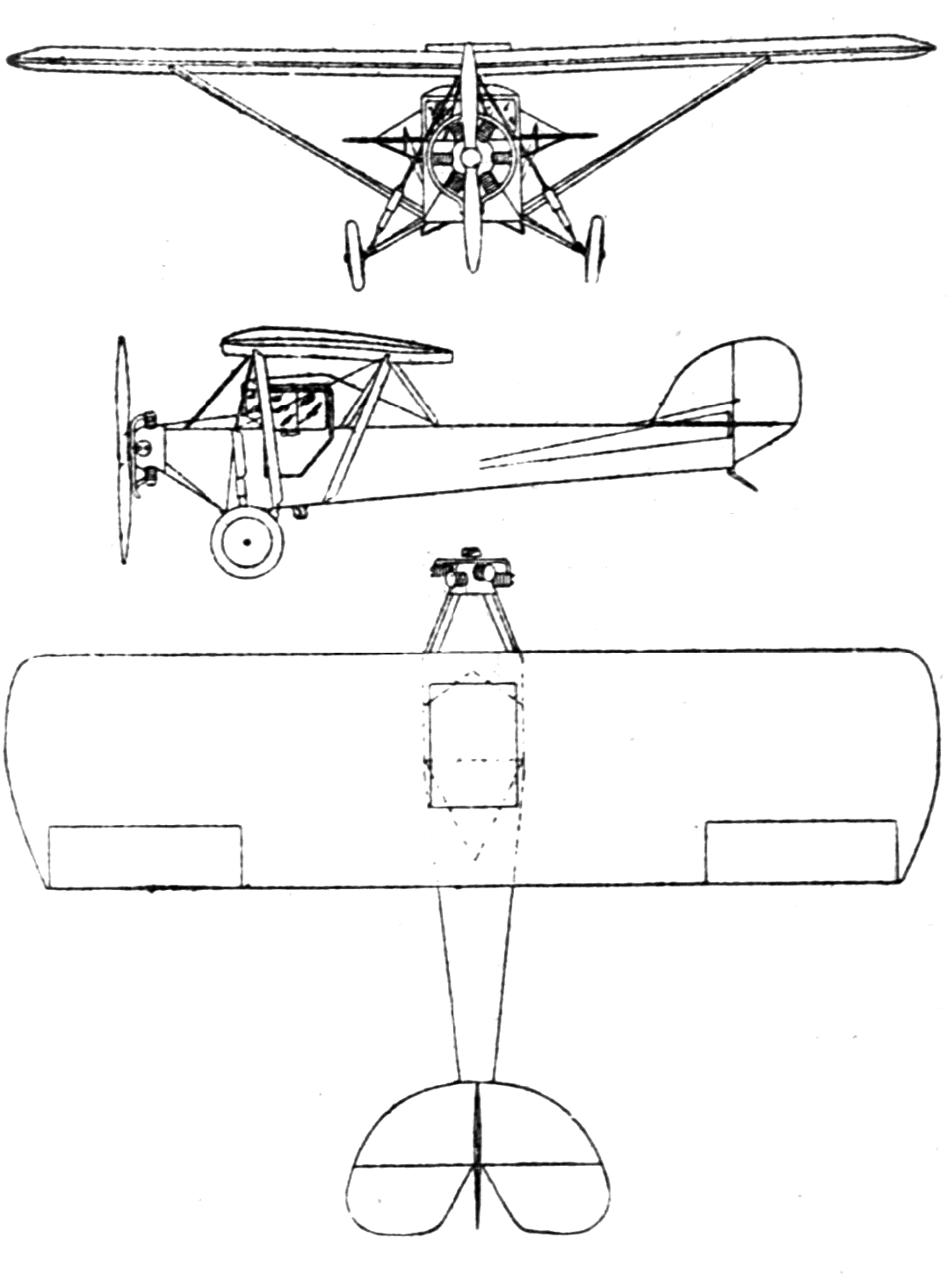
Elias Aircoupe 3-view drawing from Le Document aéronautique March,1929

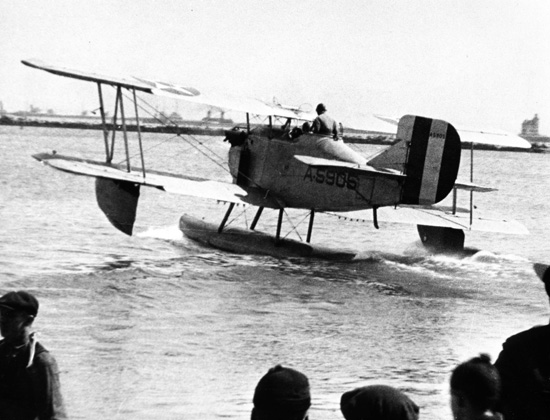
Elias EM-1

== See also ==
- Martin NBS-1
- List of military aircraft of the United States
- List of bomber aircraft
