= Antonov 181 =

1980s Soviet experimental aircraft

Antonov Izdelie 181
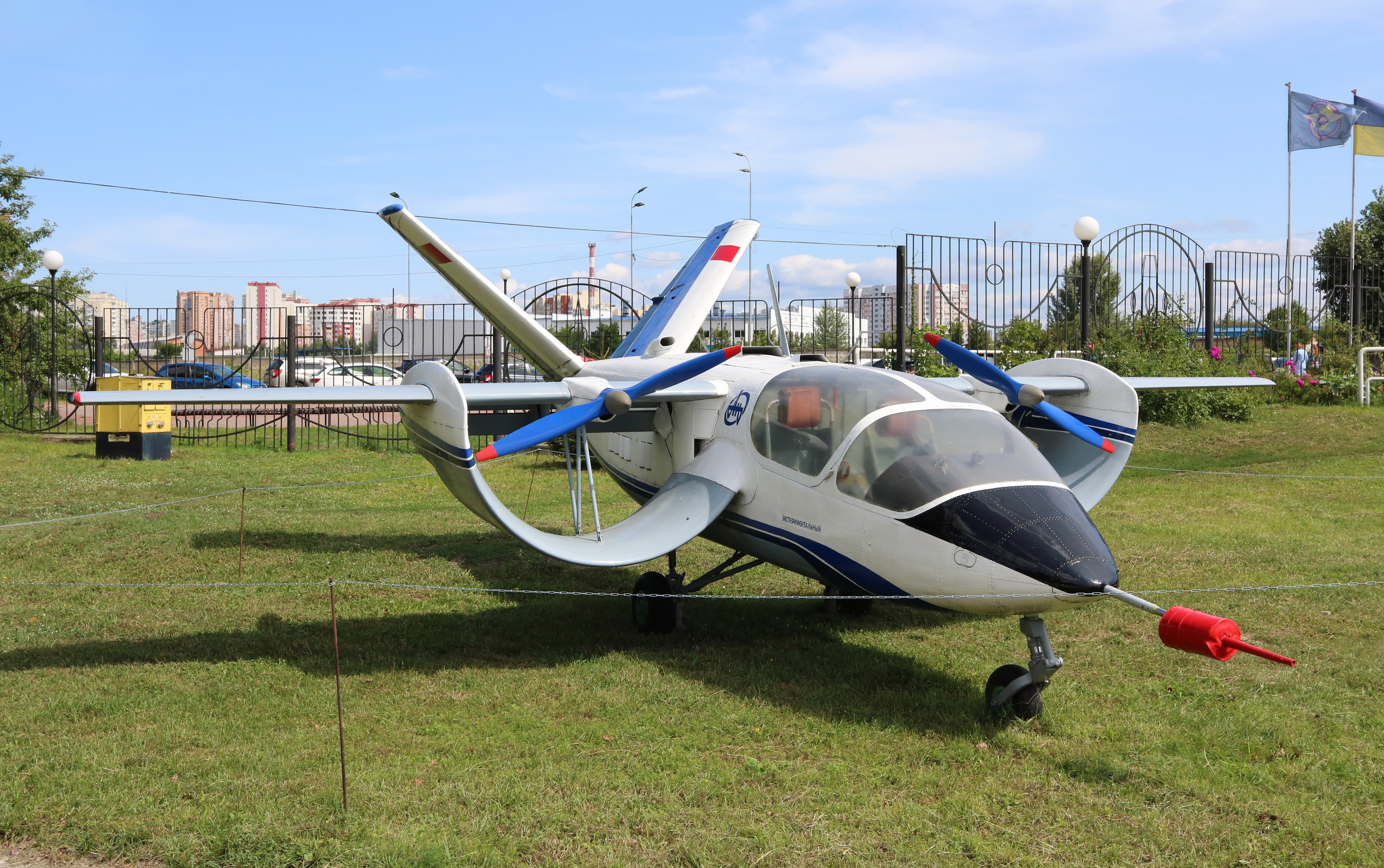

General information
- Type: Research aircraft
- Manufacturer: Antonov
- Designer: Mykola Opanasovych Orlov
- Number built: 1

The Antonov Izdelie 181 (Ukrainian: Виріб 181, Russian: изделие 181, sometimes unofficially called An-181) was a Soviet experimental aircraft created in the 1980s.

== History ==
The izdelie 181 project was terminated due to the lack of funds following the collapse of the Soviet Union. An interesting feature of the plane is its unusual arc-shaped wing, known as a channel wing; in addition, the aircraft has side-by-side seating, a fixed tricycle landing gear configuration, and a V-tail. Power from the engine is delivered by means of drive shafts and deflection gearboxes to the two-blade propellers. The aircraft received the registration СССР-190101 and is exhibited in the State Museum of Aviation of Ukraine. Willard Ray Custer had previously built aeroplanes with the same wing concept in the USA.

== Specifications ==
General characteristics

- Crew: 2 people
- Length: 7,31 m
- Wingspan: 7,3 m
- Height: 2,5 m
- Wing area: 7 m²
- Normal take-off weight: 820 kg
- Maximum take-off weight: 900 kg
- Engine: AP LOM M-337A, 6 cylinders, 103 kW
- Propeller diameter: 1.5 m
- Maximum speed: 225 km / h
- Practical range: 530 km
- Service height: 4200 m
- Starting distance: 70 m
- Landing distance: 80 m

== See also ==
Aircraft of comparable role, configuration, and era

- Custer CCW-5

== Sources ==
- Antonov X plane
