= Elias EM =

Elias
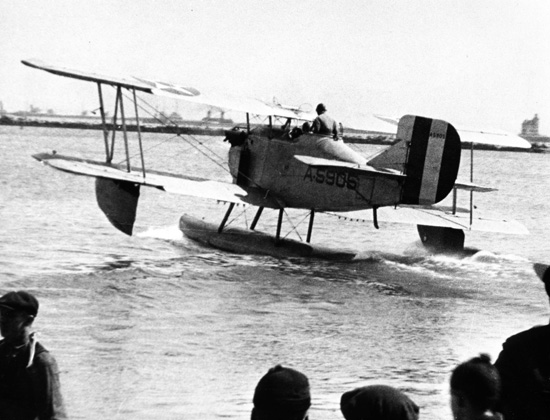
- EM-1

General information
- Type: Utility biplane
- Manufacturer: Elias
- Primary users: United States Navy United States Marine Corps
- Number built: 7

History
- Introduction date: 1922

The Elias EM was a 1920s American general-purpose and marine expeditionary biplane built by Elias.

== Development ==
The company designed the Elias EM-1 to meet a United States Marine Corps requirement for a multirole marine expeditionary aircraft. It was required to operate on either floats or wheels. The EM-1 was a tandem two-seat unequal-span biplane powered by a 300 hp (224 kW) Wright-Hispano H engine. The prototype was modified with equal-span wings and delivered to the Marine Corps in 1922. Six production aircraft were built (designated EM-2) having equal-span wings, being powered by 400 hp (298 kW) Liberty 12 inline engines.

One production aircraft was delivered to the United States Marine Corps and five to the United States Navy. One of the Navy aircraft was modified as an observation aircraft and redesignated EO-1.

== Variants ==
EM-1
Prototype with a 300hp (224kW) Wright-Hispano H engine, one built.
EM-2
Production aircraft with a 400hp (298kW) Liberty 12 inline engine, six built including one later converted to an EO-1.
EO-1
One EM-2 aircraft converted as an observation aircraft.

== Operators ==
United States

- United States Marine Corps
- United States Navy

== Specifications (EM-2) ==
Data from The Illustrated Encyclopedia of Aircraft

General characteristics

- Crew: two
- Length: 28 ft 6 in (8.69 m)
- Wingspan: 39 ft 8 in (12.09 m)
- Height: 10 ft 9 in (3.28 m)
- Gross weight: 4,233 lb (1,920 kg)
- Powerplant: 1 × Liberty 12 inline piston engine , 400 hp (298 kW)

Performance

- Maximum speed: 120 mph (193 km/h, 100 kn)

Armament

- dorsal 0.3 inch machine gun

== See also ==
Related lists

- List of United States Navy aircraft designations (pre-1962)
