= Elias XNBS-3 =

American bomber prototype

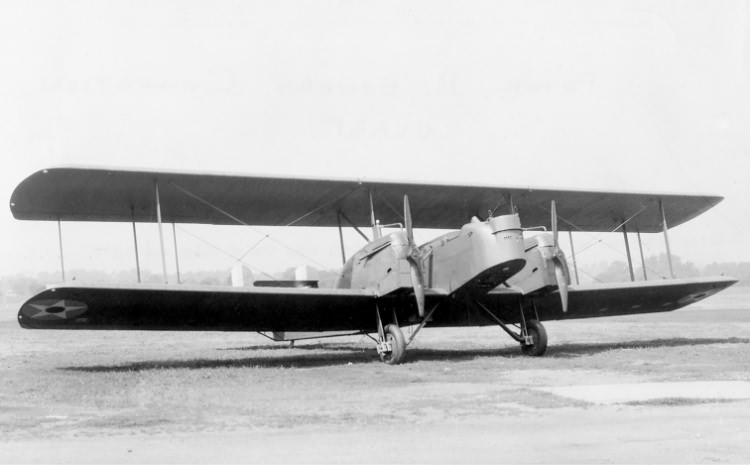

General information
- Type: Night bomber
- National origin: United States
- Manufacturer: Elias
- Primary user: United States Army Air Corps
- Number built: 1

The Elias XNBS-3 was a 1920s prototype biplane bomber built by Elias for the United States Army Air Corps.

== Development ==
The XNBS-3 was a large biplane bomber with a steel tube fuselage and powered by two 425 hp (317 kW) Liberty 12A piston engines. It had a conventional landing gear with a tailskid and a crew of four. The prototype was designated XNBS-3 (XNBS=prototype night bomber short distance). On 13 August 1924 Lieutenant John A. Macready test piloted the Elias XNBS-3 twin engine bomber for the United States Army Air Corps at McCook Field in Dayton, Ohio. The XNBS-3 had New York to Chicago non-stop range and five machine guns for defense. It was similar to the earlier Martin NBS-1 and was no real improvement, so it was not ordered into production.

== Operators ==
United States

- United States Army Air Corps

== Specifications ==
Data from National Museum of the United States Air Force

General characteristics

- Crew: four
- Length: 48 ft 5 in (14.76 m)
- Wingspan: 77 ft 6 in (23.63 m)
- Height: 16 ft 10 in (5.13 m)
- Gross weight: 14,427 lb (10,763 kg)
- Powerplant: 2 × Liberty 12A , 425 hp (317 kW) each

Performance

- Maximum speed: 101 mph (163 km/h, 88 kn)
- Range: 465 mi (748 km, 404 nmi)
- Service ceiling: 8,680 ft (2,650 m)

Armament

- 1692 lbs of bombs
- Five 0.30in machine-guns

== See also ==
Aircraft of comparable role, configuration, and era

- Martin NBS-1

Related lists

- List of military aircraft of the United States
- List of bomber aircraft
