= Elias TA-1 =

TA-1

General information
- Type: Biplane trainer
- Manufacturer: Elias
- Primary user: United States Army Air Service
- Number built: 3

The Elias TA-1 was a 1920s American biplane training aircraft built by Elias. Only three aircraft were built for evaluation by the United States Army Air Service.

The TA-1 (a United States military designation Trainer, Aircooled No. 1) was designed to meet a United States Army requirement for a training aircraft for the air service. The TA-1 was a conventional two-seat biplane. Three were built, two with a Lawrance R-1 engine and another with an ABC Wasp, the last two under McCook field project numbers Elias P-178 and Elias P-179. The aircraft performance was inferior to the other aircraft under evaluation (the Dayton-Wright TA-3) and no orders were placed or further aircraft built.

== Operators ==
United States

- United States Army Air Service

== Specifications (TA-1) ==
Data from The Illustrated Encyclopedia of Aircraft (Part Work 1982-1985), 1985, Orbis Publishing, Page 1599

General characteristics

- Crew: two
- Length: 24 ft 9 in (7.54 m)
- Wingspan: 32 ft 7 in (9.93 m)
- Powerplant: × Lawrance R-1 , 140 hp (104 kW)

Performance

== See also ==
Related lists

- list of military aircraft of the United States
