= Elias AJE Air Express =

Prototype mail plane built in the United States in 1927

AJE Air Express

General information
- Type: Mail plane
- National origin: United States
- Manufacturer: Elias
- Number built: 1

History
- First flight: c.1927
- Developed from: Elias M-1 Mailplane

The Elias AJE Air Express was a prototype mailplane built in the United States around 1927 by G. Elias and Brother. The design was intended to be adaptable to a number of other roles, but failed to attract any orders and did not progress beyond its single prototype.

== Design ==
The AJE Air Express was a development of the company's Elias M-1 Mailplane, with which it was marketed side-by-side in 1926. It was a single-bay, equal-span, unstaggered biplane of conventional configuration. Its fuselage incorporated a 65-cubic-foot (1.8 m^{3}) duralumin-lined mail compartment and an open cockpit for the pilot. The tail was of conventional design, and it was equipped with fixed, tailskid undercarriage. Power was supplied by a piston engine in the nose driving a tractor propeller. The ends of the wings were braced with N-struts, and in place of bracing wire, interplane bracing was achieved with steel tube.

The fuselage and tail were built from welded steel tube, and the wings from wood. The whole aircraft was covered in fabric.

From the outset, Elias hoped that the mail compartment could also be fitted with cameras for aerial survey work, or be used as a chemical hopper for crop-dusting. Despite this forward thinking, the aircraft failed to find a market.

== Specifications ==
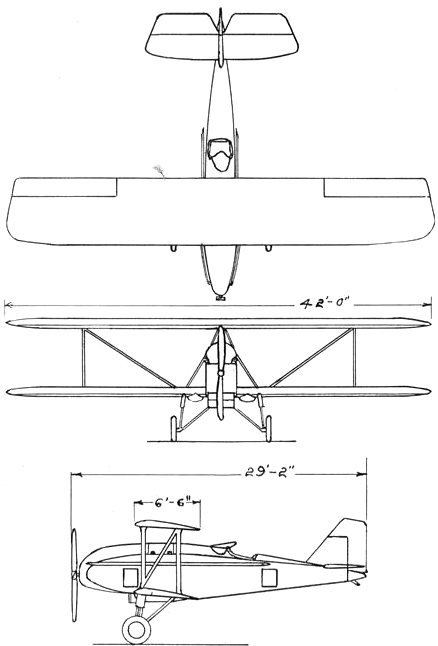
Three-view drawing of Elias AJE Air Express. Note dimensions slightly different from those published in Jane's

Data from Grey & Bridgman 1928, p.219

General characteristics

- Crew: 1 pilot
- Capacity: mail compartment of 65 cubic feet (1.8 m^{3}) with normal load of 1,200 pounds (540 kg)
- Length: 29 ft 2 in (8.89 m)
- Wingspan: 44 ft (13 m)
- Height: 11 ft 8 in (3.56 m)
- Wing area: 540 sq ft (50 m^{2})
- Empty weight: 2,890 lb (1,311 kg)
- Gross weight: 4,960 lb (2,250 kg)
- Powerplant: 1 × Liberty L-12 water-cooled, 12-cylinder V engine

Performance

- Maximum speed: 126 mph (203 km/h, 109 kn)
- Range: 550 mi (890 km, 480 nmi)
- Service ceiling: 15,800 ft (4,800 m)

== Notes ==
=== Bibliography ===
- Aircraft Year Book 1926. New York: Aeronautical Chamber of Commerce of America. 1926.
- The Illustrated Encyclopedia of Aircraft. London: Aerospace Publishing.
- Grey, C.G.; Bridgman, Leonard (1928). Jane's All the World's Aircraft 1928. London: Sampson Low Marston.
- McLaughlin, George F. (August 1926). "American Commercial Airplanes". Aero Digest. Vol. 9, no. 2. New York: Aeronautical Digest Publishing. pp. 90–94.
