= Washington Airlines =

American airline

- Founded: 1968; 58 years ago
- Ceased operations: 26 September 1969; 56 years ago
- Destinations: Baltimore, Washington
- Key people: Robert Richardson

Washington Airlines is a defunct airline that was based in the United States The service was the FAA's first approved instance of a STOL airline service.

== History ==
Washington Airlines was founded to operate under a concept that STOL operations could enhance airport capacity without significant infrastructure costs. In 1968 Albert Scott Crossfield demonstrated the concept flying 160 operations between Boston, La Guardia and Washington National for Eastern Airlines. There was worldwide interest in the concept of STOL operations within cities with limited land for expansion. New York had $126 million planned for construction of STOL runways in 1970.

The company was founded by Butler Aviation International and Pan Maryland Airways. Butler had franchise rights to sell Dornier Do 28 aircraft in America, and chose the aircraft for their STOL service. After five months in service between BWI, DCA and IAD the company was losing money with load factors of 20% and a total net loss of $100,000. Washington Airlines ceased operations on 26 September 1969

== Destinations ==
- Baltimore, Maryland (BWI)
- Washington D.C. (DCA)
- Washington D.C. (IAD)

== Fleet ==
The fleet consisted of the following aircraft as of 1969:

Israir Airlines Fleet
Aircraft	Total	Routes	Notes
Dornier Do 28	10	KDCA, KBWI, KIAD

== See also ==
- List of defunct airlines of the United States
