= Curtiss-Caproni =

- Genre: Aircraft manufacturer
- Founded: 1929
- Headquarters: Baltimore, Maryland
- Number of employees: 2
- Parent: Curtiss-Wright

Curtiss-Caproni was an Italian-American aircraft manufacturer formed in the late 1920s to produce Caproni aircraft in America as part of the Curtiss-Wright aviation conglomerate.

As early as 1917, Curtiss was contracted to build Caproni-designed aircraft. On 18 May 1918, Curtiss received an order to build 500 Caproni aircraft. The Caproni test pilots died testing prototypes, and replacements never materialized.

A production partnership was tried again in 1929 with the forming of the Curtiss-Caproni Company. Curtiss-Caproni built a 200,000-square-foot (19,000 m^{2}) construction factory in Dundalk, Maryland with a 20-year lease from the city of Baltimore and the hiring of George C. Westervelt as manager. Construction was completed in 1930 at the peak of the Great Depression with the intent of hiring 500 to 1000 employees. Employment was reduced to two after completion of the plant and agreements were made to delay operating expenses with the city of Baltimore until production commenced. The factory was later occupied by the General Aviation Corporation in 1931. Curtiss-Caproni was absorbed into its parent company, the new Curtiss-Wright, on 5 July 1929.
