= Brown Aeronautical Company =

- Industry: Aircraft manufacturer
- Founded: 1910
- Defunct: 1911
- Fate: Dissolved in 1911
- Headquarters: Baltimore, Maryland
- Key people: Edward R Brown, Don Swann, Clyde Loose

Brown Aeronautical Company was an American aircraft manufacturer in the pioneering era of flight between 1900 and 1914.

Three young men from Baltimore founded Brown Aeronautical shortly after the Halethorpe Air Meet of 1910. The first aircraft built, the Brown Lord Baltimore, was destroyed in a fire in October 1910. The second, the Brown Lord Baltimore II, had its first flight promoted throughout the city. On 17 May 1911, the hydroplane was demonstrated near the Light Street Bridge in the Curtiss Bay of Baltimore. The 22-year-old Washington, D.C.–based pioneering aviator Tony Jannus was hired for the successful test flight in front of a large group of spectators. Two-seat aircraft and flight training were rare at the time. Company owner Edward Brown took the controls of the Lord Baltimore II alone for his first flight in an aircraft on 19 May. He climbed 50 feet and spun into the bay, not able to turn the aircraft around. The injured Brown did not attempt to fly again. Clyde Loose attempted to fly the Lord Baltimore II on 2 July, but wrecked in some bushes. The aircraft was reassembled soon after.

An announcement that the Brown aircraft would be flown to Washington D.C. via Annapolis was released. On 9 July 1911, Jannus attempted to fly the aircraft again configured as a hydroplane with Clyde Loose as a passenger. After three attempts, the aircraft was grounded with a failed radiator. Brown publicized the aircraft would fly to Frederick the next day.

The aircraft was tested through the summer. One flight by Loose on 27 July included Frank Brown Jr, son of Maryland's Governor Frank Brown. Partner Don Swan flew the aircraft once to fifty feet and landed after he found he could not turn the aircraft. Swan's wife grounded him permanently afterward. The company was dissolved later in 1911.

== Aircraft ==
Summary of aircraft built by Brown Aeronautical Company
Model name	First flight	Number built	Type
Brown Lord Baltimore	1910	1	Curtiss Style Biplane
Brown Lord Baltimore II	1911	1	Curtiss Style Hydroplane
