= Elias EC-1 Aircoupe =

EC-1 Aircoupe
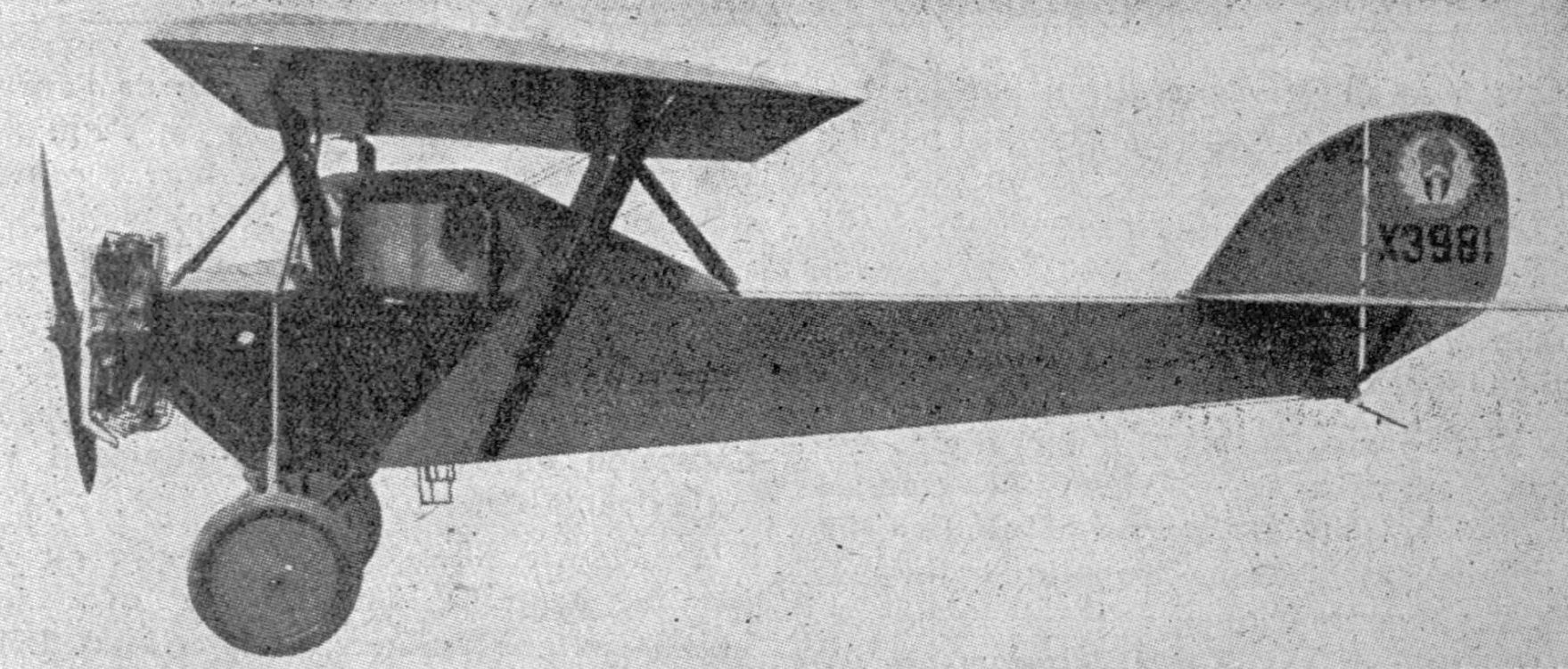

General information
- Type: Sporting monoplane
- National origin: United States
- Manufacturer: Elias
- Designer: Joseph Cato
- Number built: 1

History
- First flight: 1928

The Elias EC-1 Aircoupe was an American two-seat parasol wing monoplane designed and built by Elias of Buffalo, New York.

== Design and development ==
The EC-1 Aircoupe was a parasol wing monoplane powered by an 80 hp (60 kW) Anzani engine which first flew in 1928. Designed by Joseph Cato, it had an open cockpit with a removable cabin enclosure. The airplane was known as the Airsport when flown without the cabin enclosure. The EC-1 was also available with a 100 hp (75 kW) Kinner K-5 engine. One prototype is known, but more may have been produced.

== Specifications ==
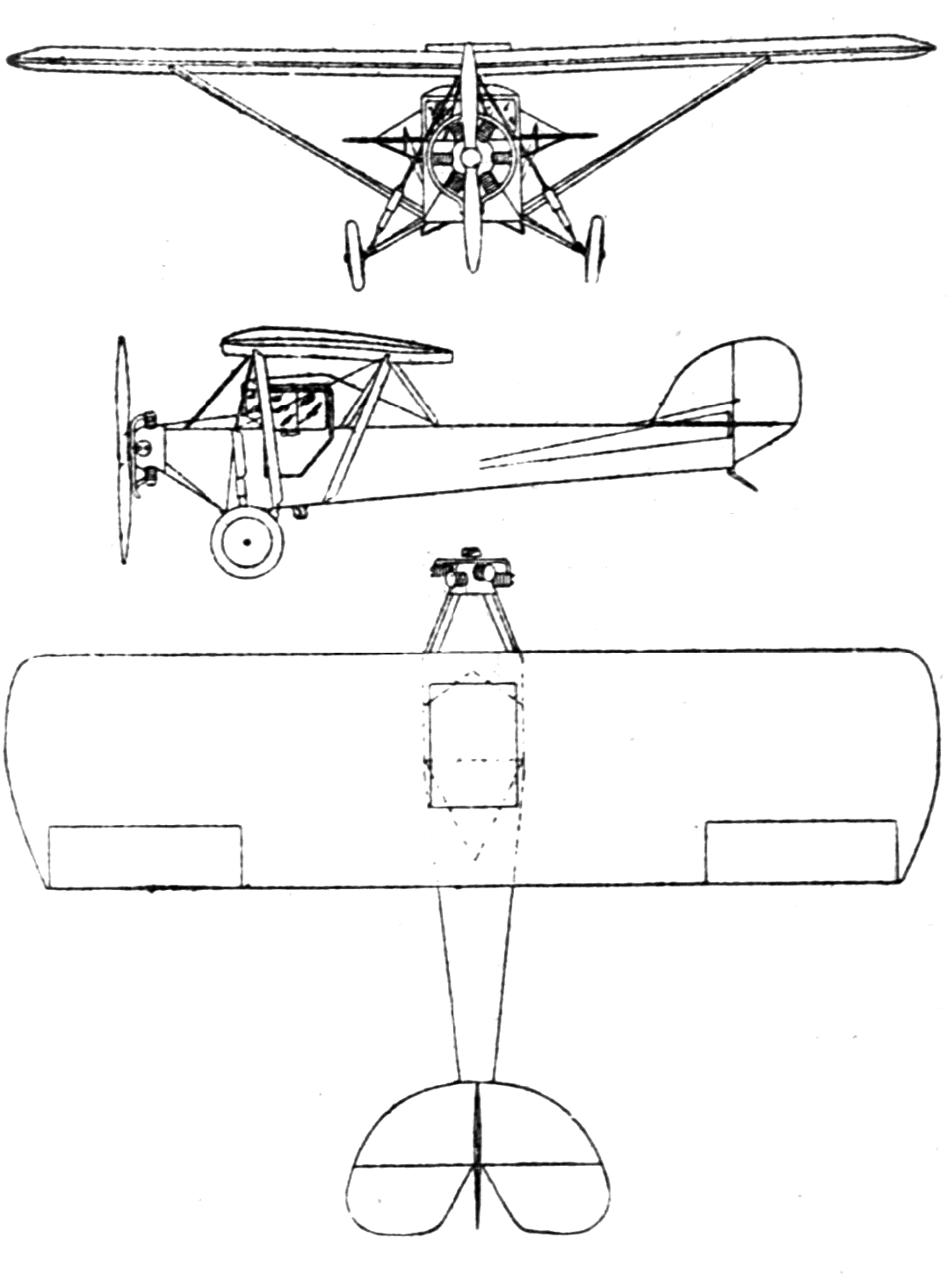
Elias Aircoupe 3-view drawing from Le Document aéronautique March,1929

Data from www.aerofiles.com, Jane's all the World's Aircraft 1928

General characteristics

- Crew: 2
- Length: 20 ft 11 in (6.38 m)
- Wingspan: 28 ft 2 in (8.59 m)
- Height: 7 ft 5 in (2.26 m)
- Wing area: 192 sq ft (17.8 m^{2})
- Empty weight: 870 lb (395 kg)
- Gross weight: 1,388 lb (630 kg)
- Powerplant: 1 × Anzani 6 cylinder two-row air-cooled radial piston engine, 80 hp (60 kW)
- Propellers: 2-bladed wooden fixed pitch propeller

Performance

- Maximum speed: 90 mph (140 km/h, 78 kn)
- Cruise speed: 80 mph (130 km/h, 70 kn)
- Stall speed: 30 mph (48 km/h, 26 kn)
- Range: 400 mi (640 km, 350 nmi)
- Service ceiling: 10,000 ft (3,000 m)
- Rate of climb: 590 ft/min (3.0 m/s)
- Wing loading: 7 lb/sq ft (34 kg/m^{2})
- Power/mass: 0.0576 hp/lb (0.0947 kW/kg)
- Fuel consumption: 5 gal/h (4.2 imp gal/h; 19 L/h)
- Oil consumption: 0.4 gal/h (0.33 imp gal/h; 1.5 L/h)
