= Willard Ray Custer =

American aerospace engineer

William Ray Custer
- Born: June 6, 1899; Warfordsburg, Pennsylvania
- Died: December 25, 1985 (aged 86); Hagerstown, Maryland
- Known for: Custer Channel Wing

Willard Ray Custer (June 6, 1899, Warfordsburg, Pennsylvania – December 25, 1985, Hagerstown, Maryland) was an American engineer and aircraft visionary, inventor of the channel wing concept.

Custer left school at age 13, working as a blacksmith and, later, an engineer and mechanic.

The inspiration to the channel wing concept came in 1925 when Custer had observed how the roof of a barn was lifted during a very strong gust of wind. He started investigating the phenomenon and, by 1928, he had developed the first Model of a new airplane wing for which he received a patent in 1929. (Note: US patent US1708720A, "Aeroplane", published 1929-04-09) This channel wing managed much lift even at very low airspeeds and allowed start and landing on very short airfields.

In 1939 Custer founded the National Aircraft Corporation and, on November 12, 1942, started development of the CCW-1 (CusterChannelWing 1) experimental aircraft. With the CCW-2 that followed, he could achieve almost vertical starts, and flight almost like a helicopter. The military started a number of trials which were subsequently canceled despite some interesting achievements. Later, Custer founded the Custer ChannelWing Corporation and, in 1954, built more aircraft. The last one, the CCW-5, almost reached series production.

The principle of the channel wing was not well understood by many, especially at the time. Custer was an experimenter and visionary, with many patents filed, but he did not have a strong theoretical and scientific background. The Custer Channelwing Corporation had to cease its activities, and the channel wing principle was mostly forgotten. Today, only two CCW aircraft survive. The CCW-1 is displayed at the Smithsonian´s National Air and Space Museum, Suitland, Maryland, while the CCW-5 is at the Mid-Atlantic Air Museum, Pennsylvania.
