= Baumann Brigadier =

Twin-engined light transport aircraft, 1947

B-290 Brigadier
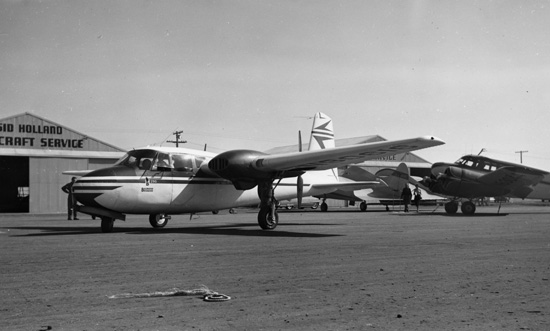

General information
- Type: Light transport
- National origin: United States
- Manufacturer: Baumann Aircraft Corporation
- Designer: Jack Boyer Baumann
- Number built: 2

History
- First flight: June 1947
- Developed into: Custer CCW-5

The Baumann Brigadier was a prototype American light transport aircraft of the late 1940s. It was a twin-engined monoplane, which, unusually, was of pusher configuration. Only two were built, plans for production never coming to fruition.

== Development and design ==
Jack Baumann, who had worked for the Taylor Aircraft Company (later to become Piper Aircraft) and Lockheed, set up the Baumann Aircraft Corporation in Pacoima, Los Angeles, California in 1945. His first design for the new company was the B-250 Brigadier, a twin-engined pusher monoplane intended as an executive transport. It was of all-metal construction, with cantilever shoulder mounted wings, and with the pusher engines mounted in nacelles on the wing. An enclosed cabin accommodated a pilot and four passengers, while the aircraft was fitted with a retractable nosewheel undercarriage.

The first prototype, powered by two 125 hp (93 kW) engines (hence the B-250 designation) flew on 20 June 1947. Piper Aircraft was interested in building a tractor version of the Brigadier, and purchased the B-250 prototype and its drawings, designating it the PA-21, with some sources claiming that the B-250 formed the basis of the Piper Apache, although other sources state that Piper abandoned work on the PA-21 and that the Apache was unrelated.

Baumann continued development of the pusher Brigadier, with the second example, the B-290, being fitted with 145 hp (108 kW) Continental C-145 engines but was otherwise similar to the B-250. The B-290, registered N90616, crash-landed at Pacoima on January 8, 1953, heavily damaging the fuselage and injuring pilot Ward C. Vettel and flight engineer Thomas Cox. Production at a rate of one aircraft per month was planned for the B-290. The Brigadier was chosen by Willard Ray Custer as the basis of his Custer CCW-5, which used the fuselage and tail of the Brigadier, but had a modified wing with the engines sitting in U-shaped ducts, but other than the two CCW-5s no production of the B-290 followed. Baumann continued to propose more powerful versions of the Brigadier, but no airframes resulted.

== Variants ==
B-250 Brigadier
Initial prototype. Two 125 hp (93 kW) engines.
B-290 Brigadier
More powerful second prototype (two 145 hp (108 kW) engines).
B-360 Brigadier
Planned version with 180 hp (130 kW) Lycoming engines.
B-480 Super Brigadier
Planned enlarged version with 240 hp (180 kW) Continental O-470 engines.
Piper PA-21
Proposed tractor-engined production version of the B-250, abandoned.

== Specifications (B-290) ==
Data from Jane's All The World's Aircraft 1953–54.

General characteristics

- Crew: 1
- Capacity: 4 passengers
- Length: 27 ft 5 in (8.36 m)
- Wingspan: 41 ft (12 m)
- Height: 10 ft 2 in (3.10 m)
- Wing area: 207 sq ft (19.2 m^{2})
- Empty weight: 2,200 lb (998 kg)
- Gross weight: 3,500 lb (1,588 kg)
- Fuel capacity: 78 US gallons (300 L)
- Powerplant: 2 × Continental C145-H air-cooled Flat-six engine, 145 hp (108 kW) each
- Propellers: 2-bladed Sensenich

Performance

- Maximum speed: 190 mph (310 km/h, 170 kn)
- Cruise speed: 165 mph (266 km/h, 143 kn) (75% power)
- Stall speed: 45 mph (72 km/h, 39 kn) (power on)
- Range: 750 mi (1,210 km, 650 nmi)
- Service ceiling: 18,000 ft (5,500 m)
- Rate of climb: 1,250 ft/min (6.4 m/s)

== See also ==
Related development

- Custer CCW-5
