= Mid-Atlantic Air Museum =

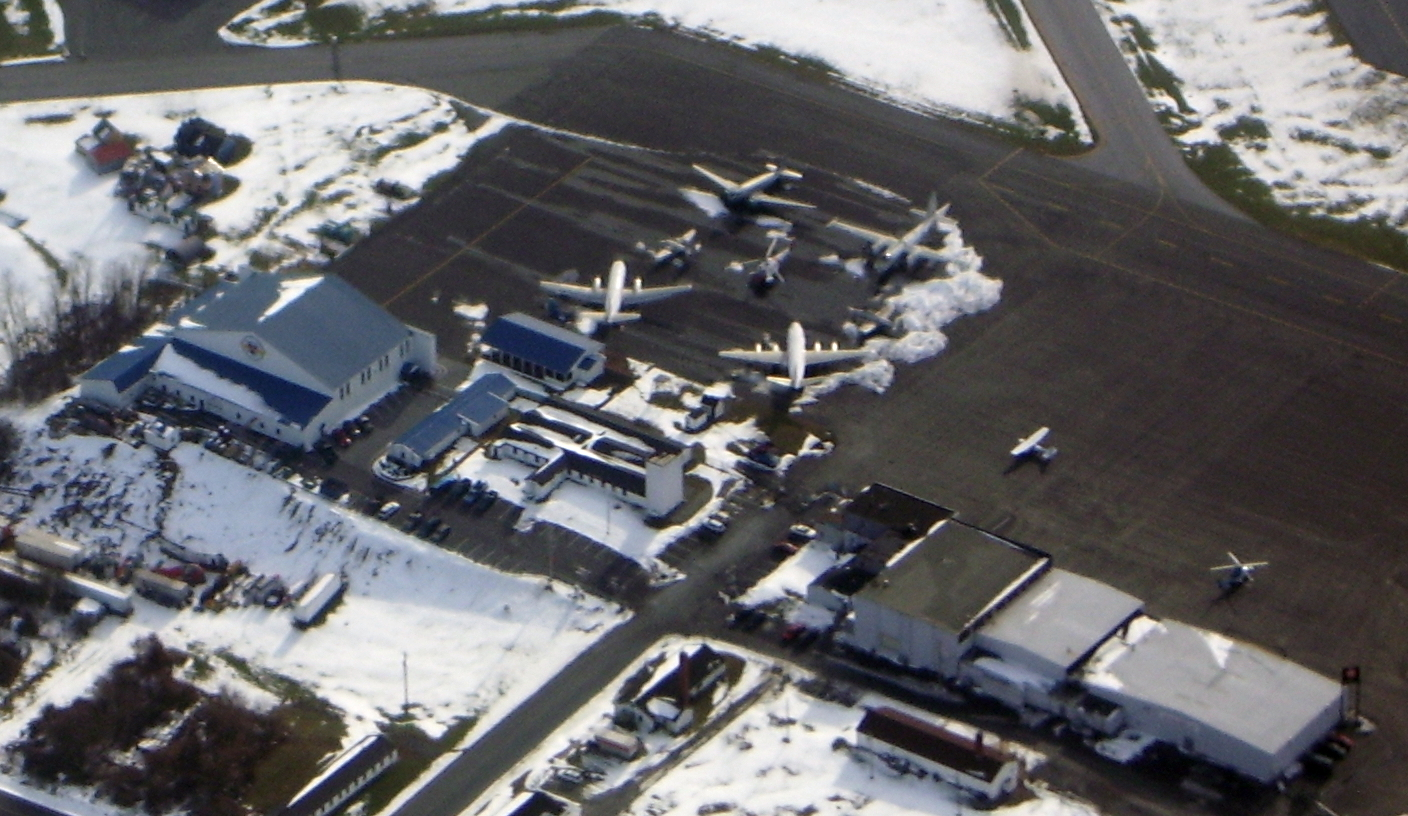
- An aerial view of the museum

- Location in Pennsylvania
- Established: 1980
- Location: Reading, Pennsylvania
- Coordinates: 40.382°N 75.967°W
- Type: Aviation museum
- Founders: Eugene Strine; Russell A. Strine
- Director: Eugene Strine
- President: Russell A. Strine
- Website: http://www.maam.org

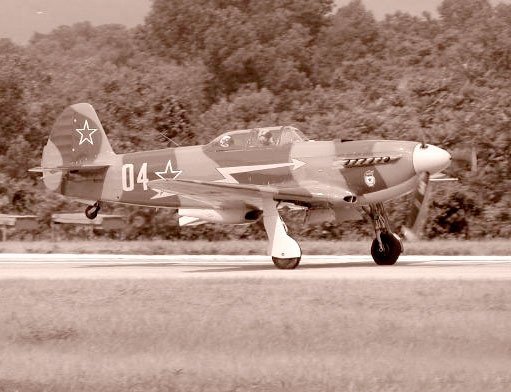
Vintage Soviet Yak-9 on takeoff at the 2002 MAAM WWII Weekend Air Show.

The Mid-Atlantic Air Museum (MAAM) is an aviation museum and aircraft restoration facility located at Reading Regional Airport in Reading, Pennsylvania. The museum, founded by Russ Strine, the current President, collects and actively restores historic war planes and classic airliners as well as rare civilian and military aircraft. Many of the museum's historic aircraft are often seen on the airshow circuit.

== Overview ==
The Mid-Atlantic Air Museum has hosted the “World War II Weekend Air Show” annually since 1990. The event is generally scheduled to coincide with 6 June, attracting nearly 100,000 people.

The museum offers rides in their vintage North American SNJ and in a Stearman Biplane on the second Saturday of the month from May through October, excluding the month of June.

It has also undertaken an ambitious project to restore its Northrop P-61B Black Widow, recovered from New Guinea in 1989, to flying condition.

Mid Atlantic Air Museum also sells aircraft for MS Flight Simulator of some of their restored aircraft, such as the B-25, C-47, and TBM Avenger.

In 2014, the museum acquired 10 t-hangars from a company called Airlife Hangars.

In 2017, the construction of a new 6,400 sq ft (590 m^{2}) hangar and 3,200 sq ft (300 m^{2}) storage building was approved, and work began the following year.

== Aircraft on display ==
- Aeronca C-3
- Aeronca K
- Aichi D3A – replica
- American Aerolites Double Eagle
- American Eagle Eaglet 31
- Arrow Model F
- Auster Mk.V J/1 Autocrat
- Beechcraft Model G18S
- Bellanca 14-19-3 Cruisair
- Stearman N2S-3 Kaydett
- Brunner-Winkle Bird
- Cessna 150M Commander
- Cessna UC-78 Bobcat
- Commonwealth 185 Skyranger
- CCW-5 Channelwing
- Douglas R4D-6 Skytrain
- Elias EC-1 Aircoupe
- ERCO 415-G Ercoupe
- Fairchild 24 G
- Fairchild C-119F Flying Boxcar
- Fairchild PT-19
- Fairchild PT-26 Cornell
- Eastern Aircraft TBM-3E Avenger
- Heath CNA-40 Midwing
- Heath LNA-40
- Kellett KD-1
- Kinner B-1
- Lockheed SP-2H Neptune
- Martin 4-0-4
- Naval Aircraft Factory N3N
- North American B-25J Mitchell
- North American F-86F Sabre
- North American SNJ-4B Texan
- Northrop P-61B Black Widow
- Piasecki H-21B Shawnee
- Pietenpol Air Camper
- Piper J-2 Cub
- Piper NE-1 Cub
- Piper L-21B Grasshopper
- Piper PA-22 Tripacer
- Piper PA-22-150 Caribbean
- Piper PA-34-200 Seneca
- Republic F-84B Thunderjet
- Republic RC-3 Seabee
- Ried Flying Submarine
- Rutan VariEze
- Sikorsky UH-34D Seahorse
- Sikorsky HH-52A Seaguard
- Spratt 108
- Taylor-Young Model A
- Troyer VX
- Vickers 745D Viscount
- Vultee BT-13A Valiant
