= Custer Channel Wing =

Experimental American aircraft design

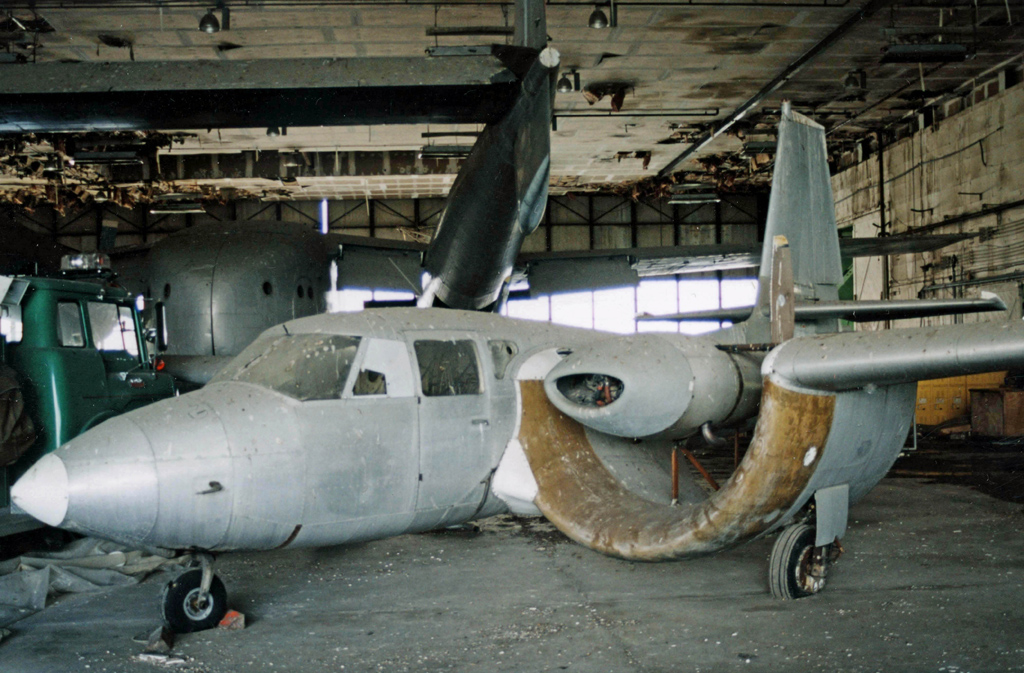
The second CCW-5 preserved by the Mid-Atlantic Air Museum in Reading, Pennsylvania

The Custer Channel Wing is a series of American-built experimental aircraft designs of the 1940s and 1950s incorporating a half-barrel shaped section to each wing.

== The channel wing principle ==
In 1925, Willard Custer noticed how very strong winds had managed to lift the roof of a barn. He realized that the high velocity of the wind created a lower pressure above the roof while the pressure remained high inside, literally lifting the roof off. This low pressure above/high pressure below is the same phenomenon that allows an airplane wing to provide lift.

Custer developed a wing design incorporating a semi-circular channel or "half barrel" shape in which an engine was to be fitted, in order to draw air over the wing and, in 1929, he received a United States patent. (Note: US patent US1708720A, "Aeroplane")

The arrangement is intended to draw enough air over the wing, even when moving slowly, to create sufficient lift to fly. Custer claimed that this layout, the channel wing, gave STOL operating capabilities and resulted in a design "which is an aircraft not an airplane. It does not plane the air to fly, rather it brings the air to the lift surfaces and reduces pressure to fly at 8 to 11 mph." (Note: "American airplanes: Cu - Cy". K. O. Eckland's AeroFiles. 2008-08-03.)

== CCW-1 ==
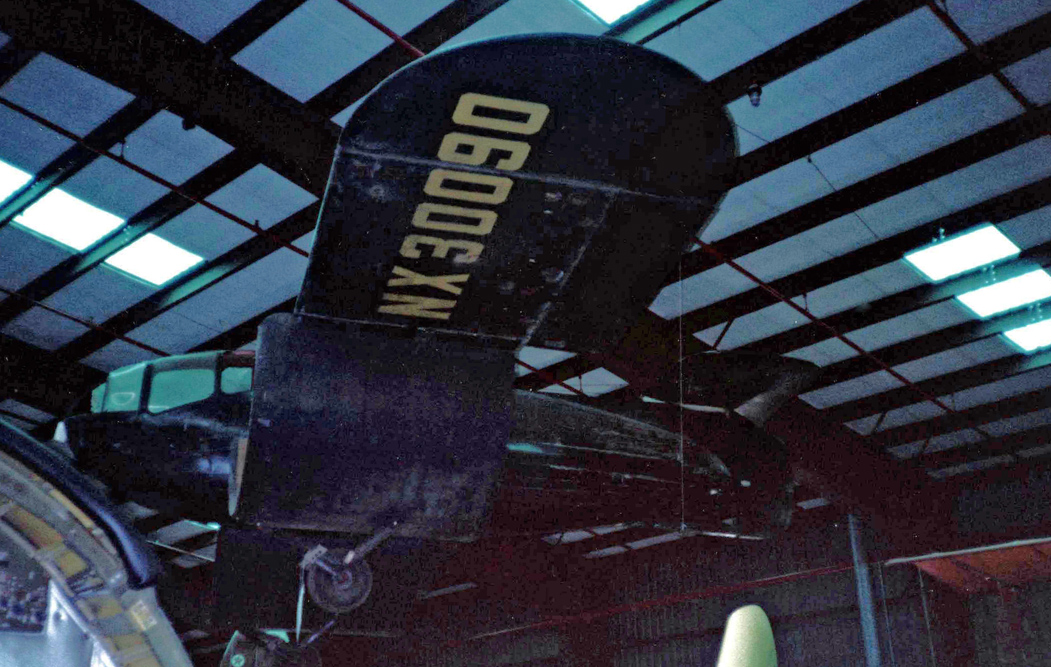
The prototype Custer CCW-1 single-seat test aircraft displayed at the National Air and Space Museum facility at Silver Hill, Maryland in April 1982

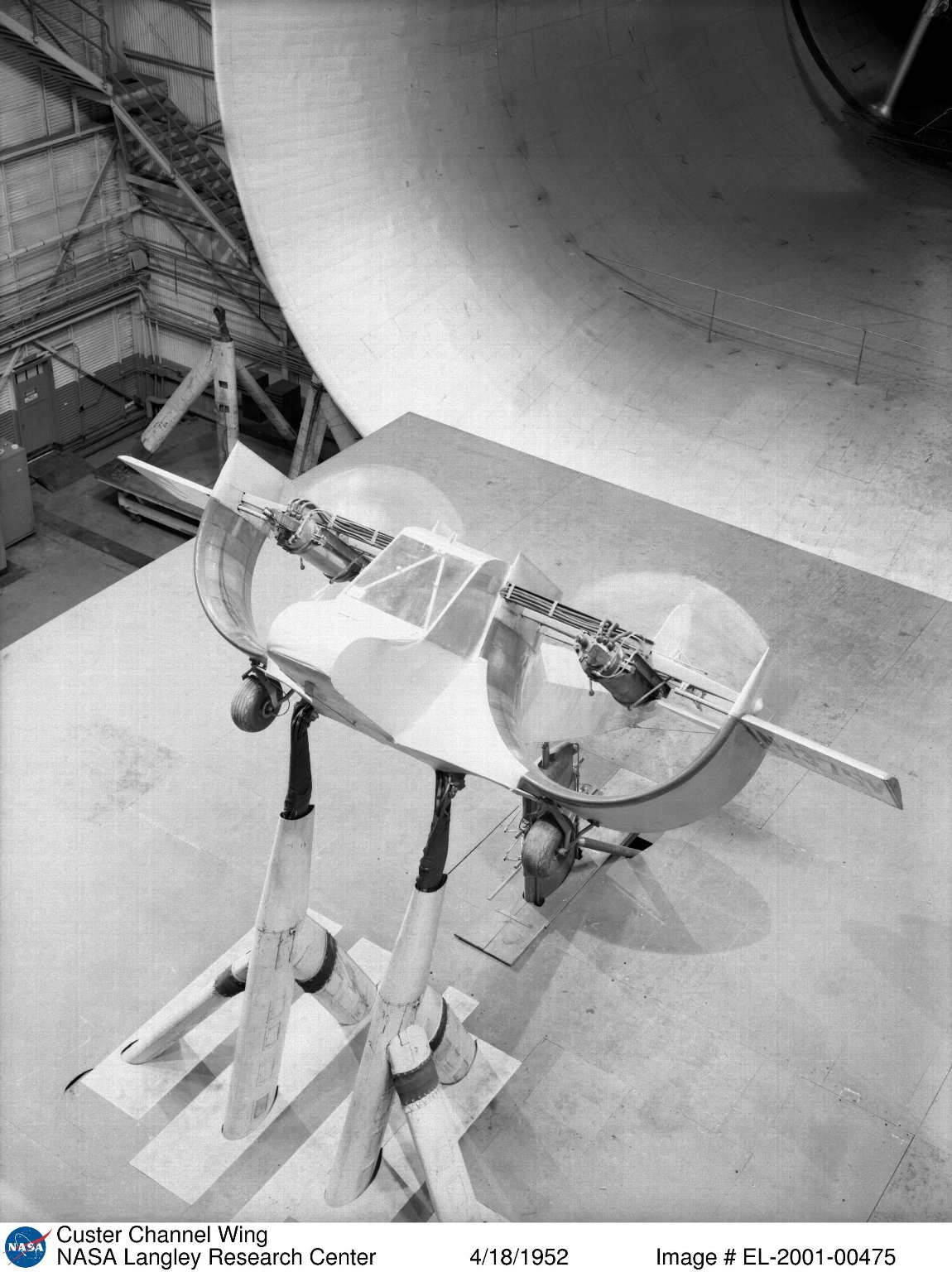
Channel Wing concept testing at Langley

The first aircraft to incorporate Custer's concept was the CCW-1 which was fitted with a single-seat and was powered by two 75 horsepower (56 kW) Lycoming O-145 pusher engines. Registered NX30090 in the FAAs experimental category, the sole example first flew on 12 November 1942 during a solo flight that was quite unintentional. Custer, who was a non-pilot, taxied the aircraft in a demonstration for financial backers and it suddenly became airborne. A hard landing followed, and one landing gear collapsed, but this did not dampen his backers' enthusiasm.

The prototype was test flown by Frank D. Kelley, who would become a partner in the National Aircraft Corporation with Custer. The Channelwing concept was demonstrated with scale wind tunnel tests for the United States Army Air Forces in Dayton in June 1944, and again, in 1946, with 53 different configurations.

NX30090 was donated to the National Air and Space Museum and displayed at Silver Hill, Maryland.

== CCW-2 ==
This was an evolution of the CCW-1 as a single-seat test bed and used an adapted uncovered fuselage of a Taylorcraft BC-12 light aircraft, replacing the single engine with two pusher engines fitted each side of the fuselage and placed within the wing channels. The sole example N1375V first flew on July 3, 1948. It was flown for about 100 hours of testing with take-off and landing being made within 45–65 feet (14–20 m). Despite the claim of "flying better than a conventional aircraft," it was calculated that a stock Piper Cub was more efficient, lifting 18 lb/hp (11 kg/kW) versus the CCW-2's 11 lb/hp (6.7 kg/kW). The CCW-3 and CCW-4 designations were not used.

== The Custer Channel Wing Corporation ==
In 1951, Custer formed the Custer Channel Wing Corporation with a registered address at 1905 West Washington Street, Hagerstown, Maryland.

Taylorcraft Inc of Conway, Pennsylvania were the first manufacturers to be licensed for the production of both military and private aircraft using the Channel Wing principles. The first type intended to be produced was an experimental military aircraft to comply with United States Air Force specifications for a liaison aircraft. It was to carry a pilot and three fully equipped combat troops or 10 litter patients. Performance envisaged was a 1,000-pound (450 kg) load, cruising at 150 knots (280 km/h; 170 mph) or better over a five-hour cruise range. Taylorcraft never put the plans into action. A design had been prepared by early 1952 for a single-engined channel wing aircraft with the engine fitted in a single channel immediately behind the crew cabin, but this aircraft was not built. Design numbers CCW-3 and CCW-4 were not used.

In 1978, Custer filed an US$80 million (equivalent to US$395 million in 2025) suit (Note: "Custer v. United States". casetext. 1980-05-14.) against the designers of the A-10 for using his idea of induced lift from the proximity of the engines to the wings. The suit was dismissed.

== CCW-5 ==
Custer's Corporation went on to develop and build the five-seat CCW-5, intended for commercial sale. The first example N6257C was designed by Custer but built by the Baumann Corporation of Santa Barbara, California. It utilized an adapted fuselage and tail assembly of a Baumann Brigadier. Power was from two pusher 225 h.p. Continental O-470 engines. The first flight was made on July 13, 1953 .

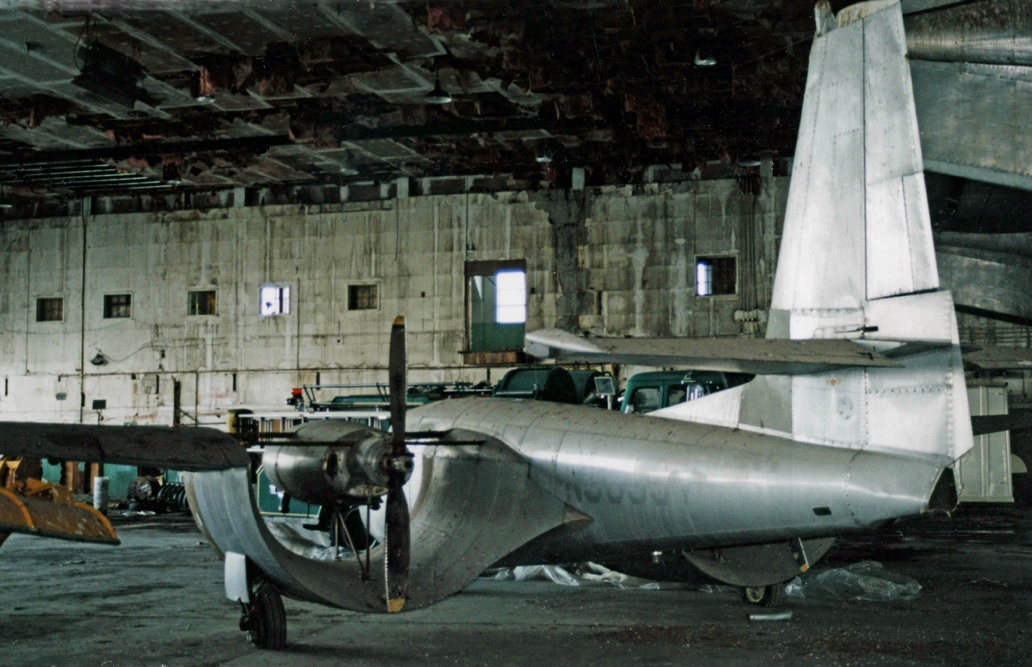
Rear view of the second CCW-5 showing the fixing of the pusher engine within the wing channels.

The second example N5855V was manufactured at the Custer factory. It again used a Baumann Brigadier fuselage and tail assembly. This aircraft first flew on June 19, 1964. Although several firms expressed interest in production of the design, all failed to provide the necessary downpayment.

The CCW-5 accommodated five persons, and its power plants are suspended in the center of the 6-foot (1.8 m)-chord wing channels on tubular frameworks attached to the wing spars. The aircraft draws air through the channels at high velocity, decreasing pressure over the wings and increasing lift. The CCW-5 was claimed to be capable of flying at a sustained speed of 35 miles per hour (56 km/h).

The CCW-5 continued to make developmental flights during the 1960s and 1970s, but no production orders were obtained.

N5855V was donated to the Mid-Atlantic Air Museum at Reading Airport, Pennsylvania and is on restricted display.
