= List of aircraft (Df–Dz) =

This is a list of aircraft in alphabetical order beginning with 'Df–Dz'.

== Df–Dz ==
=== DF Helicopters ===
- DF Helicopters DF333
- DF Helicopters DF334

=== DFS ===
(Deutsche Forschungsanstalt für Segelflug) see also: RRG

- DFS 39
- DFS 40
- DFS 54
- DFS 193
- DFS 194
- DFS 203
- DFS 228
- DFS 230
- DFS 230F (despite designation it was a totally new aircraft)
- DFS 331
- DFS 332
- DFS 346
- DFS B6
- DFS Condor
- DFS E 32
- DFS Einheitsschulflugzeug
- DFS Fliege IIa
- DFS Ha III
- DFS Habicht
- DFS Hangwind
- DFS Hol's der Teufel
- DFS Jacht 71
- DFS Kranich
- DFS Maikäfer
- DFS Mo 6
- DFS Mo 12
- DFS Moazag'otl
- DFS Olympia Meise
- DFS Präsident
- DFS Professor
- DFS Reiher
- DFS Rhönbussard
- DFS Rhönadler
- DFS Rhönsperber
- DFS São Paulo
- DFS Seeadler
- DFS SG 38
- DFS Stanavo
- DFS Weihe

=== DFW ===
(Deutsche Flugzeug-Werke G.m.b.H)

- DFW B.I
- DFW B.II
- DFW C-type
- DFW C.I
- DFW C.II
- DFW C.III
- DFW C.IV
- DFW C.V
- DFW C.VI
- DFW D.I
- DFW D.II
- DFW Dr.I
- DFW T.28 Floh
- DFW T.34-I
- DFW T.34-II
- DFW Mars
- DFW P.1
- DFW Pfiel
- DFW R.I
- DFW R.II
- DFW R.III
- DFW Stahl-Taube
- DFW F 34
- DFW F 37
- D.F.W. Pusher Biplane
- DFW MD 14
- DFW flugboot

=== DG ===
(DG Flugzeugbau GmbHpreviously Gläser-Dirks)

- Rolladen-Schneider LS8
- LS10
- DG Flugzeugbau DG-800
- DG Flugzeugbau DG-808
- DG Flugzeugbau DG-1000 S

=== DGRCN ===
(Dirección General de Reparaciones y Construcciones Navales - Mexico)

- DGRCN Tonatiuh MX-1

=== Diablo ===
(Diablo Aircraft Co, Stockton, CA)

- Diablo 1929 Biplane

=== Diamond Aircraft ===
- Diamond DA20
- Diamond DV20
- Diamond DA40 Star
- Diamond DA42 TwinStar
- Diamond DA50
- Diamond HK36 Super Dimona
- Diamond D-Jet
- Diamond Dart 280
- Diamond Dart 450

=== Díaz ===
(Amalio Díaz)

- Díaz type C

=== Dickey ===
(Shirl Dickey Enterprises, Phoenix, AZ)

- Dickey E-Racer Mark 1
- Dickey E-Racer Mark 2
- Dickey King Racer

=== Didier ULM ===
(Francheval, France)

- Didier Pti'tAvion

=== Diehl ===
(Diehl Aero-Nautical, Jenks, OK)

- Diehl XTC Hydrolight

=== Diemert ===
(Bob Diemert)

- Diemert Defender

=== Dietrich ===
(Dietrich-Gobiet Flugzeugwerke AG - 1922, Richard-Dietrich-Flugzeugbau-GmbH, Dietrich Flugzeugwerke AG, Mannheim)

- Dietrich DP.I
  - Dietrich DP.I Sperber
- Dietrich DP.II
  - Dietrich DP.II Bussard
  - Dietrich DP.IIa
- Dietrich DP.III (Abandoned)
- Dietrich DP.IV (Project)
- Dietrich DP.V (Project)
- Dietrich DP.VI
- Dietrich DP.VII
  - Dietrich-Gobiet DP.VII
  - Dietrich-Gobiet DP.VIIA
- Dietrich DP.IX
- Dietrich DP.XI
- Dietrich DS.I

=== Dietz ===
((Conrad G) Dietz Laboratories, Cincinnati, OH, 1925: Dietz Aeroplane Co, 815 Herman Ave/33 Hess St, Dayton, OH)

- Dietz C-4
- Dietz 1927 Biplane
- Dietz 1928 Biplane
- Dietz Nighthawk
- Dietz Paraplane
- Dietz Special a.k.a. 'The Comet'

=== Dietz-Schreiber ===
- Dietz-Schreiber Skylark

=== DiFoGa ===
(Frits Diepens Ford Garage)

- DiFoGa 421

=== DINFIA ===
(Dirección Nacional de Fabricación e Investigación Aeronáutica - Spanish language for "National Directorate of Aeronautical Manufacturing and Research").

- DINFIA IA 24
- DINFIA IA 25 Mañque
- DINFIA IA 28
- DINFIA IA 31
- DINFIA IA 32 Chingolo
- DINFIA IA 35 Huanquero
  - DINFIA IA 35 Type 1A
  - DINFIA IA 35 Type 1U
  - DINFIA IA 35 Type II
  - DINFIA IA 35 Type III
  - DINFIA IA 35 Type IV
  - DINFIA Constancia II
  - DINFIA Pandora
  - DINFIA IA 35 Guaraní I
- DINFIA IA 38 Naranjero
- DINFIA IA 45 Querandi
- FMA IA 50 Guaraní II

=== DirectFly ===
(DirectFly sro, Hluk, Czech Republic)

- DirectFly Alto
- DirectFly ArGO

=== Discovery Aviation ===
- Discovery Aviation Model 201

=== Distar ===
(Distar Air)

- Distar UFM-13 Lambada
- Distar Samba XXL

=== Dittmar ===
- Dittmar HD 153 Motor-Möwe

=== Dixie ===
(Charles W Lay, Cincinnati, OH)

- Dixie 1924 Monoplane

=== Dixon ===
(Jess Dixon, Andalusia, AL)

- Dixon 1936 Helicopter

=== Dixon ===
(Tom Dixon, Burlington, NC)

- Dixon Special

=== DJB ===
(DJB Aeroplane Co (Harry Deuther, Junkin & Brukner), the basis for Weaver Aircraft Co. )

- DJB Flying Boat
- DJB Scout

=== D.K.D. ===
see:Działowskich

=== DLR ===
(Deutsches Zentrum für Luft- und Raumfahrt e.V. (DLR) - German Aerospace Center)

- DLR HY4

=== D.N.F. ===
(Dupperon, Niepce & Fetterer)

- D.N.F. 1916 bomber

=== Doak ===
(Doak Aircraft Co Inc, Torrance, CA )

- Doak DRD-1
- Doak Model 16
- Doak VZ-4

=== Doak & Deeds ===
((Edward) Doak & (Woody) Deeds Aircraft Co, Culver City, CA)

- Doak & Deeds Sportsman

=== Dobi ===
(Jurgis Dobkevičius - Lithuania)

- Dobi-I
- Dobi-II
- Dobi-III

=== Doblhoff ===
(Friedrich Baron von Doblhoff)

- Doblhoff WNF 342

=== Dobson ===
(Franklin A. Dobson, Whitter, CA, USA)

- Dobson Convertiplane

=== Dockery-Barneko ===
(Leland Dockery and Ralph Barnecko, Valparaiso, IN)

- Dockery-Barneko S-1

=== Doerflein ===
(Howard Doerflein, Milwaukee WI.)

- Doerflein Sportsman

=== Dokuchayev ===
(Aleksnadr Yakovlevich Dokuchayev)

- Dokuchayev 1910 biplane
- Dokuchayev No.2 biplane
- Dokuchayev No.3 biplane
- Dokuchayev No.4 biplane
- Dokuchayev No.5 monoplane
- Dokuchayev No.6 biplane
- Dokuchayev 1910 biplane (Aleksnadr Yakovlevich Dokuchayev)
- Dokuchayev 1912 sesquiplane
- Dokuchayev 1914 biplane
- Dokuchayev 1915 sesquiplane trainer
- Dokuchayev 1916 monoplane
- Dokuchayev 1916 biplane

=== Doflug ===
(Dornier-Werke AG)

- Doflug D-3800
- Doflug D-3801
- Doflug D-3802
- Doflug D-3802A
- Doflug D-3803

=== Doman ===
(1945: (Glidden S) Doman-(Clinton W) Frasier Helicopters Inc, New York, NY and Stamford, CT, 1949: Doman Helicopters Inc, Danbury, CT 195?: Berlin Doman Helicopters Inc (Europe).)

- Doman D-10B
- Doman D-11
- Doman LZ-1
- Doman LZ-1A
- Doman LZ-2A Pelican
- Doman LZ-4
- Doman LZ-5
- Doman H-31
- Doman HC-1

=== Dominion ===
(Dominion Aircraft Corporation Ltd, Renton, WA)

- Dominion Skytrader 800

=== Donnet-Denhaut ===
(Société des Établissements Donnet-Denhaut)

- Donnet-Denhaut flying boat
- Donnet-Denhaut Hispano-Suiza 140/150 hp
- Donnet-Denhaut Lorraine 160 hp
- Donnet-Denhaut Canton-Unné 160 hp
- Donnet-Denhaut Hispano-Suiza 200 hp RR
- Donnet-Denhaut Hispano-Suiza 275 hp
- Donnet-Denhaut Bimoteur
- Donnet-Denhaut DD-1
- Donnet-Denhaut DD-2
- Donnet-Denhaut DD-3
- Donnet-Denhaut DD-8
- Donnet-Denhaut DD-9
- Donnet-Denhaut DD-10
- Donnet-Denhaut P.10
- Donnet-Denhaut P.15
- Donnet H.B.3

=== Donnet-Lévêque ===
- Donnet-Leveque Type A
- Donnet-Leveque Type B
- Donnet-Leveque Type C
- Donnet-Leveque 1912 flying boat
- Donnet-Leveque 1913 flying boat racer
- Donnet-Leveque PD

=== Dopourdois ===
(Georges Dopourdois)

- Dopourdois DV.219

=== Dorand ===
(Colonel Émile Dorand, director of the Section Technique de l'Aéronautique (STAé) at Chalais-Meudon / Société d`Études des Giravions Dorand)

- Dorand 1908 Avion Militaire
- Dorand 1909 Laboratoire
- Dorand 1911 biplane
- Dorand AR.1
- Dorand AR.2
- Dorand DO.1
- Dorand armoured interceptor
- Dorand BU
- Dorand flying boat

=== Dorand ===
(Réne Dorand / Société d'Etudes des Giravions Dorand / Société Francaise Du Gyroplane)

- Dorand DH.011
- Dorand G.II Gyroplane
- Dorand G.20 Gyroplane

=== Dorland ===
(L S Dorland, San Francisco, CA)

- Dorland Helicopter

=== Dormoy ===
(Etienne Dormoy, Detroit, MI and Dayton, OH)

- Dormoy 1919 Biplane
- Dormoy 1920 Biplane
- Dormoy Bathtub

=== Dorna ===
(H F Dorna Company)

- Dorna Parandeh Abi
- Dorna Parandeh Sefid
- Dorna Free Bird

=== Dornier ===
(Dornier Werke GmbH) (During World War 1, Dornier designed for Zeppelin-Lindau)

- Dornier Cs.I
- Dornier Gs I
- Dornier Gs II
- Dornier Do A Libelle and Libelle II
- Dornier Do B Merkur
- Dornier Do B Bal Merkur II
- Dornier Do C
- Dornier C III Komet I
- Dornier Do C2
- Dornier Do C3
- Dornier Do C4
- Dornier Do D
- Dornier Do E
- Dornier Do F
- Dornier G I Greif
- Dornier Do H Falke
- Dornier Do H Seefalke
- Dornier Do J Wal
- Dornier Do J B
- Dornier Do J G
- Dornier Do J K
- Dornier Do J II
- Dornier Do K1
- Dornier Do K2
- Dornier Do K3
- Dornier L1 Delphin I
- Dornier L2 Delphin II
- Dornier L3 Delphin III
- Dornier Do N
- Dornier Do O
- Dornier Do P
- Dornier Do Q
- Dornier Do R2 Superwal
- Dornier Do R4 Superwal
- Dornier Do S
- Dornier Do T
- Dornier Do U
- Dornier Do V
- Dornier Do X
- Dornier Do Y
- Dornier Do 10
- Dornier Do 11
- Dornier Do 12 Libelle III
- Dornier Do 13
- Dornier Do 14
- Dornier Do 15
- Dornier Do 16 Wal
- Dornier Do 17
- Dornier Do 18
- Dornier Do 19
- Dornier Do 20
- Dornier Do 22
- Dornier Do 23
- Dornier Do 24
- Dornier Do 25
- Dornier Do 26
- Dornier Do 27
- Dornier Do 28
- Dornier Do 29
- Dornier Do 31
- Dornier Do 32
- Dornier Do 34
- Dornier 128
- Dornier Do 200
- Dornier Do 212
- Dornier Do 214
- Dornier Do 215
- Dornier Do 216
- Dornier Do 217
- Dornier 228
- Dornier Do 317
- Dornier Do 318
- Dornier 328
- Dornier Do 335 Pfeil
- Dornier Do 435
- Dornier Do 535
- Dornier Do 635
- Dornier 628
- Dornier Do 417
- Dornier 728
- Dornier Alpha Jet
- Dornier Spatz
- Dornier Libelle (1921)
- Dornier Libelle II
- Dornier Libelle III
- Dornier Delphin I
- Dornier Delphin II
- Dornier Delphin III
- Dornier Falke
- Dornier Greif
- Dornier Merkur
- Dornier Merkur II
- Dornier Komet I
- Dornier Komet II
- Dornier Komet III
- Dornier Seefalke
- Dornier Superwal
- Dornier Wal
- Dornier Pfeil
- Dornier Schneider trophy projects
- Dornier LTA

=== Dornier Seawings ===
- Dornier Seawings Seastar

=== Dornier (Altenrhein) ===
see FFA

=== Douglas ===
(Charles M Ford, Al M Williams, and members of the Douglas Flying Club, Douglas, AZ)

- Douglas 1909 Biplane

=== Douglas ===
see also: Davis-Douglas, McDonnell-Douglas

- Douglas D-109 (DC-1-109)
- Douglas D-112 (DC-2-112)
- Douglas D-113
- Douglas D-114
- Douglas D-115 (DC-2-115)
- Douglas D-117
- Douglas D-118 (DC-2-118, C-32A)
- Douglas D-119
- Douglas D-120 (DC-2-120, C-32A)
- Douglas D-123 (DC-2-123)
- Douglas D-124 (DC-2-124)
- Douglas D-125 (DC-2-125, R2D-1)
- Douglas D-127 (DC-2-127)
- Douglas D-129
- Douglas D-142 (DC-2-142, R2D-1)
- Douglas D-144 (DST-144, C-49E, DC-3A)
- Douglas D-145 (DC-2-145, C-33, R2D-1)
- Douglas D-151 (DF-151)
- Douglas D-152 (DC-2-152)
- Douglas D-153 (DC-2-153, C-32)
- Douglas D-171 (DC-2-171, C-32A)
- Douglas D-172 (DC-2-172)
- Douglas D-173 (DC-2-173, YC-34)
- Douglas D-178 (DC-3-178)
- Douglas D-185 (DC-2-185)
- Douglas D-190 (DC-2-190)
- Douglas D-191 (DC-3A, converted C-48C)
- Douglas D-192 (DC-2-192)
- Douglas D-193 (DC-2-193)
- Douglas D-194 (DC-3-194, C-49H)
- Douglas D-195 (DF-195)
- Douglas D-196 (DC-3-196)
- Douglas D-197 (DC-3-197, DC-3A-197, C-48C)
- Douglas D-197D (C-52)
- Douglas D-199 (DC-2-199)
- Douglas D-200 (DC-2-200)
- Douglas D-201 (DC-2-201)
- Douglas D-201D C-48C
- Douglas D-201F C-49B & G
- Douglas D-201G C-49D
- Douglas D-202 (DC-3B-202)
- Douglas D-203 (DT-203, 6 passenger, development of Northrop A-17A)
- Douglas D-204 (DO-204)
- Douglas D-207 (DST-A-207A, converted C-48A/B)
- Douglas D-208 (DC-3-208)
- Douglas D-209 (DC-3-209)
- Douglas D-210 (DT-210, DC-2-210)
- Douglas D-211 (DC-2-211)
- Douglas D-214 (DC-3, DC-3-214)
- Douglas D-216 (DC-3-216)
- Douglas D-217 (DST-217, converted C-49, later converted DC-3A)
- Douglas D-220 (DC-3-220)
- Douglas D-221 (DC-2-221)
- Douglas D-227 (DC-3, DC-3-227B, converted C-49H-DO)
- Douglas D-228 (DC-3-228, DC-3A-228C, C-49H)
- Douglas D-229 (DC-3-229)
- Douglas D-232 (DC-3-232)
- Douglas D-237 (DC-3A-237)
- Douglas D-243 (DC-2-243, C-39, converted C-42)
- Douglas D-253 (C-41)
- Douglas D-260 DC-3-260
- Douglas D-267 (C-42)
- Douglas D-268 DC-3, DC-3A
- Douglas D-269 DC-3A, converted C-48C
- Douglas D-269C C-48C
- Douglas D-270B C-49E & F
- Douglas D-270C C-51
- Douglas D-276 DC-3-276 (Fokker)
- Douglas D-277 C-49H
- Douglas D-279 DC-3-279
- Douglas D-280 DB-280, B-18A Digby I for RCAF
- Douglas D-294 DC-3 (Fokker)
- Douglas D-312 P-48
- Douglas D-314 C-49H
- Douglas D-318 C-49F
- Douglas D-320 DB-320, B-23 Dragon
- Douglas D-322A C-49F
- Douglas D-322B C-49D
- Douglas D-332F XB-31
- Douglas D-343 DC-3A-343
- Douglas D-345 DC-3A-345
- Douglas D-346 DC-2, YC-34
- Douglas D-348 DC-3A-348, converted C-52D
- Douglas D-357A C-49C
- Douglas D-360 C-47
- Douglas D-363 C-48C, C-52F
- Douglas D-367 C-47C
- Douglas D-368 C-48A
- Douglas D-375 DC-3A-375
- Douglas D-377 DC-3A-377, C-48
- Douglas D-384 C-49
- Douglas D-386 C-49C
- Douglas D-387 DC-3-387, C-49B
- Douglas D-388 R4D-2
- Douglas D-389 DC-3-389, C-49D
- Douglas D-390 C-51
- Douglas D-391 DC-3-391, C-50C
- Douglas D-392 DC-3-392, C-50D
- Douglas D-393 DC-3A-393
- Douglas D-395 DC-3-395, C-52B
- Douglas D-396 DC-3-396, C-50
- Douglas D-397 DC-3-397
- Douglas D-398 DC-3A-398
- Douglas D-399 DC-3A-399
- Douglas D-400 cargo carrier for USAAC (basic DC-6)
- Douglas D-401 C-50A
- Douglas D-402 DC-3-402, C-52C
- Douglas D-403 A-20C Havoc
- Douglas D-404 DC-3-404
- Douglas D-405 C-53
- Douglas D-406 DST
- Douglas D-407 DC-3-407
- Douglas D-408 DC-3-408, 21-passenger DC-3 for Douglas
- Douglas D-409 A-20C Havoc
- Douglas D-410 24-passenger, twin-engine airliner
- Douglas D-411 DC-3-411
- Douglas D-412 long-range bomber, a modified DC-4
- Douglas D-413 long-range supercharged bomber
- Douglas D-414 C-48C, C-68
- Douglas D-415 long-range combat transport (similar to D-413)
- Douglas D-415A C-74
- Douglas D-416 long-range, high-altitude heavy bomber for USAAC
- Douglas D-417 C-47 training mockup for USAAC
- Douglas D-418 C-53
- Douglas D-419 R4D-2
- Douglas D-420 DC-3
- Douglas D-421 DB-7C
- Douglas D-422A C-54A training mockup
- Douglas D-423 proposed heavy bomber; cancelled in favor of the B-36
- Douglas D-424 P-70 Nighthawk
- Douglas D-425A trimotor combat transport (similar to D-400)
- Douglas D-426 trimotor commercial transport
- Douglas D-427 A-20C Havoc (lend-lease)
- Douglas D-428 DC-3-428
- Douglas D-429 DC-3-429
- Douglas D-430 DC-3-430
- Douglas D-438 DC-3A-438
- Douglas D-440 C-68
- Douglas D-447 DC-3A for Pan Am
- Douglas D-448 C-74-derived airliner (DC-7)
- Douglas D-449 C-54
- Douglas D-450 C-54A
- Douglas D-451 C-54
- Douglas D-452 C-54A
- Douglas D-453 C-53C
- Douglas D-454 C-49J
- Douglas D-455 C-49K
- Douglas D-456 C-47A (R4D-5)
- Douglas D-457 C-53C
- Douglas D-458 high-wing combi transport, similar to D-425
- Douglas D-459 XA-42, XB-42 Mixmaster
- Douglas D-460 A-20H Havoc
- Douglas D-461 C-47As converted to DC-3s
- Douglas D-462 C-53Ds converted to DC-3s
- Douglas D-463 DC-4, 44-passenger version for ABA, based on C-54B
- Douglas D-464 DC-4
- Douglas D-466 XB-43 Jetmaster
- Douglas D-467 C-47B
- Douglas D-470 C-54B
- Douglas D-476 C-54D/C-54E
- Douglas D-477 DC-6-477
- Douglas D-478 XC-112/A Liftmaster
- Douglas D-481 DC-4C
- Douglas D-482 DC-4
- Douglas D-483 C-54C
- Douglas D-484 confidential project for USAAF
- Douglas D-485 confidential project for USAAF
- Douglas D-486 C-47Bs converted to DC-3s for USAAF
- Douglas D-487 C-54Bs converted to C-54Fs
- Douglas D-488 A-26D Invader
- Douglas D-489 C-54G
- Douglas D-490 XC-114A
- Douglas D-491
- Douglas D-492
- Douglas D-495
- Douglas D-496 DC-6-496
- Douglas D-497 C-54G
- Douglas D-499 X-3 Stiletto
- Douglas D-509 proposed 86 passenger version of DC-4
- Douglas D-510 DC-5-510, C-110
- Douglas D-511 DC-5-511, C-110
- Douglas D-518 DC-5-518
- Douglas D-535 DC-5-535
- Douglas D-537 proposed cargo freighter version of D-509
- Douglas D-557 A2D Skyshark
- Douglas D-558 Skystreak
- Douglas D-561 F3D Skyknight
- Douglas D-565 proposed US Navy fighter
- Douglas D-581 blimp
- Douglas D-585 proposed US Navy fighter
- Douglas D-592 mixed power fighter, Ryan FR-1 competitor
- Douglas D-593 A3D
- Douglas D-671 Skyrocket
- Douglas D-790 naval fighter
- Douglas D-906 CX-4 super heavy transport, resembled the An-225
- Douglas D-966 DC-10; 2 engine, 332 passenger (proposal)
- Douglas D-967 DC-10-3 (proposal)
- Douglas D-968 DC-10-4 (proposal)
- Douglas D-969 DC-X-200, 2 or 3 engine (proposal)
- Douglas D-974 6 engine, low-wing large transport (proposal)
- Douglas Model 1004 DC-8-1004; XB-42-derived airliner proposal
- Douglas Model 1009 DC-4-1009, DC-4, C-54E
- Douglas Model 1011 all-weather fighter
- Douglas Model 1015 Cloudster II
- Douglas Model 1028 CG-19
- Douglas Model 1037 DC-4-1037, postwar freighter version of DC-4
- Douglas Model 1119 DC-9 (1947), proposed 28 passenger, twin-engine airliner intended as a DC-3 replacement
- Douglas Model 1211J heavy bomber, B-52 competitor
- Douglas Model 1814 C-132
- Douglas Model 1848 DC-7D
- Douglas Model 1867 turboprop version of DC-6
- Douglas Model 1906 four-engine, high-wing turboprop USAF transport; C-130 competitor
- Douglas Model 1906A USMC/USN four-engine fleet aerial resupply, COD and light assault transport
- Douglas Model 1920 swing-tail DC-8 proposal
- Douglas Model 1925 four-engine DC-9; scaled-down version of DC-8
- Douglas Model 1940 DC-10 (1957), proposed civil derivative of Model 1906
- Douglas Model 2086 DC-9
- Douglas Model 2229 SST
- Douglas A-1 Skyraider
- Douglas A-2
- Douglas A-3 Skywarrior
- Douglas A-4
- Douglas A-4 Skyhawk
- Douglas A-6
- Douglas A-20 Havoc
- Douglas A-24 Banshee
- Douglas A-26 Invader
- Douglas A-33
- Douglas A-42
- Douglas AC-47 Spooky
- Douglas AD Skyraider
- Douglas A2D Skyshark
- Douglas A3D Skywarrior
- Douglas A4D Skyhawk
- Douglas B-7
- Douglas B-11
- Douglas B-18 Bolo
- Douglas B-19
- Douglas B-22
- Douglas B-23 Dragon
- Douglas B-26 Invader
- Douglas B-31
- Douglas B-42 Mixmaster
- Douglas B-43 Jetmaster
- Douglas B-66 Destroyer
- Douglas BD
- Douglas BLR-2
- Douglas BT-1
- Douglas BT-2
- Douglas BT-30
- Douglas BTD Destroyer
- Douglas BT2D
- Douglas C-1 Milirole
- Douglas C-9 Skytrain II
- Douglas C-21 Dolphin
- Douglas C-24
- Douglas C-26 Dolphin
- Douglas C-29 Dolphin
- Douglas C-32
- Douglas C-33
- Douglas C-34
- Douglas C-38
- Douglas C-39
- Douglas C-41 (modified Douglas C-33)
- Douglas C-41A (modified Douglas DC-3A)
- Douglas C-42
- Douglas C-47 Skytrain
- Douglas C-48
- Douglas C-49
- Douglas C-50
- Douglas C-51
- Douglas C-52
- Douglas C-53 Skytrooper
- Douglas C-54 Skymaster
- Douglas C-58
- Douglas C-67 Dragon
- Douglas C-68
- Douglas C-74 Globemaster
- Douglas C-84
- Douglas C-110
- Douglas C-112 Liftmaster
- Douglas C-114 Skymaster
- Douglas C-115 Skymaster
- Douglas C-116 Skymaster
- Douglas C-117 Super Dakota
- Douglas C-118 Liftmaster
- Douglas C-124 Globemaster II
- Douglas C-129 Super Dakota
- Douglas C-132
- Douglas C-133 Cargomaster
- Douglas CG-17
- Douglas F-3
- Douglas F-6 Skyray
- Douglas F-10 Skyknight
- Douglas F-24
- Douglas F3D Skyknight
- Douglas F4D Skyray
- Douglas F5D Skylancer
- Douglas F6D Missileer
- Douglas FD
- Douglas JD
- Douglas O-2
- Douglas O-5
- Douglas O-7
- Douglas O-8
- Douglas O-9
- Douglas O-14
- Douglas O-22
- Douglas O-25
- Douglas O-29
- Douglas O-31
- Douglas O-32
- Douglas O-34
- Douglas O-35
- Douglas O-36
- Douglas O-38
- Douglas O-43
- Douglas O-44
- Douglas O-46
- Douglas O-48
- Douglas O-53
- Douglas OA-3
- Douglas OA-4
- Douglas OA-5
- Douglas OD
- Douglas O2D
- Douglas P-48
- Douglas P-70 Nighthawk
- Douglas PD
- Douglas P2D
- Douglas P3D
- Douglas RD
- Douglas R2D
- Douglas R3D
- Douglas R4D
- Douglas R5D
- Douglas R6D
- Douglas SBD Dauntless
- Douglas SB2D
- Douglas T2D
- Douglas T3D
- Douglas TBD Devastator
- Douglas TB2D Skypirate
- Douglas X-3 Stiletto
- Douglas XP-472
- Douglas XS-3
- Douglas 1-X
- Douglas 1 Special
- Douglas 7
- Douglas 8
- Douglas 640
- Douglas Boston
- Douglas Cloudster II
- Douglas Commuter
- Douglas DA-1 Ambassador
- Douglas Dakota
- Douglas DAM-1
- Douglas DB-1
- Douglas DB-7
- Douglas DB-19
- Douglas DC-1
- Douglas DC-2
- Douglas DC-3
- Douglas DC-4
- Douglas DC-4E no relation to DC-4/C-54
- Douglas DC-5
- Douglas DC-6
- Douglas DC-7
- Douglas DC-8
- Douglas DC-9
- Douglas DC-10
- Douglas DF
- Douglas DF-151
- Douglas DF-195
- Douglas Digby
- Douglas Dolphin
- Douglas DOS
- Douglas DST
- Douglas DT
- Douglas DT-202
- Douglas DWC
- Douglas DXD
- Douglas FP-1
- Douglas FP-2
- Douglas Havoc
- Douglas HXD
- Douglas L2D
- Douglas LXD1
- Douglas M-1
- Douglas M-2
- Douglas M-3
- Douglas M-4
- Douglas MO-2B
- Douglas Navy Experimental Type D Flying Boat
- Douglas Navy Experimental Type D Transport
- Douglas Navy Type D Transport
- Douglas Navy Type 0 Transport
- Douglas SDW
- Douglas Sinbad
- Douglas Weilandcraft
- Douglas CC-129 Dakota Canadian Armed Forces

=== Douglas-Northrop ===
(see #Douglas)

=== Douheret ===
- Douhéret Hélicoplane

=== Dova Aircraft ===
(Paskov, Czech Republic)

- Dova DV-1 Skylark
- Dova DV-2 Infinity

=== Dow ===
(Robert W Dow, Flint, MI)

- Dow A-1

=== Downer ===
(C L Downer, Salt Lake City, UT)

- Downer 1910 Quintuplane

=== Downer ===
(Downer Aircraft Industries Inc, Alexandria, MN)

- Downer 260

=== Doyle ===
(Doyle Aero Corp, 3104 Elm Ave, Baltimore, MD)

- Doyle O-2 Oriole
- Doyle O-3 Oriole a.k.a. O-2 Special

=== Doyle ===
(Richard H Doyle, Franklin Park, IL)

- Doyle gyroplane
- Doyle Moon Maid

=== Doyle ===
( (Herbert Charles) Doyle, Rochester, NY)

- Doyle 1911 Biplane

=== Doyle-Brown ===
(Doyle-(R M) Brown Motorplane Co, New York, NY)

- Doyle-Brown Motorplane

=== Doyn ===
(Doyn Aircraft, Wichita, KS)

- Doyn Dart I (Cessna 170,172 and 175 conversions)
- Doyn Dart II (Piper Apache conversions)

=== Drachen Studio Kecur ===
(Drachen Studio Kecur GmbH, Mettmann, Germany)

- Drachen Studio Kecur Royal 912

=== Dragon ===
- Dragon 150
- Dragon 200

=== Dragon Fly ===
(Dragon fly Aircraft Corporation)

- Dragon Fly monoplane

=== Dreifke ===
(Ramon Dreifke, St Louis, MO)

- Dreifke D-2

=== Dresden ===
- Dresden 152

=== Drezet ===
(Maurice Drezet)

- Drezet 01
- Drezet-Mirouze 02 Drezair (Maurice Drezet and Alain Mirouze)

=== Driggers ===
(Willard A Driggers, 1530 Olive St, Washington, DC, and Willow Grove, PA)

- Driggers D1-A
- Driggers D2-A

=== Driggs ===
(Driggs Aircraft Corp/Michigan Screw Co, Lansing, MI)

- Driggs Dart 1 a.k.a. DJ-1
- Driggs Dart 2
- Driggs Skylark 3

=== Driggs-Johnson ===
( (Ivan) Driggs-(E A) Johnson Airplane & Supply Co, Dayton, OH)

- Driggs-Johnson DJ-1 Bumblebee
- Driggs-Johnson Canary a.k.a. DJ-1

=== DRS Technologies ===
- DRS Technologies Neptune
- DRS Sentry HP

=== Druiff-Neate ===
- Druiff-Neate Cycloplane

=== Druine ===
- Druine RD.1
- Druine RD.30
- Druine Aigle 777
- Druine D.3 Turbulent
- Druine D.31 Turbulent
- Druine D.4 Turbulent
- Druine D.5 Turbi
- Druine D.60 Condor
- Druine D.61 Condor
- Druine D.62 Condor

=== DS ===
(Lebanon)

- DS-1 Papillon

=== DSA ===
(Delft Student Aeroclub (DSA))

- Lambach HL.I
- Lambach HL.II

=== D.S. ===
- D.S. No.1 Papillon

=== DSK ===
(Duster Sailplane Kits)

- DSK Duster

=== DSK Airmotive ===
(DSK Airmotive, Ft Walton Beach, FL)

- DSK Airmotive DSK-1 Hawk
- DSK Airmotive DSK-2 Golden Hawk

=== DTA sarl ===
(Montélimar, France)

- DTA Alizés
- DTA Combo
- DTA Diva
- DTA Dynamic
- DTA Evolution
- DTA Feeling
- DTA J-RO
- DTA Magic
- DTA Voyageur

=== Duane's Hangar ===
(Patrick Duane, Liberty, SC)

- Duane's Hangar Ultrababy

=== du Temple ===
- du Temple Monoplane

=== Dube ===
(Aviation Normand Dube, Sainte-Anne-des-Plaines, Quebec, Canada)

- Norman Dube Aerocruiser
- Norman Dube Aerocruiser Plus
- Norman Dube Aerocruiser 450 Turbo

=== Duben ===
- Duben helicopter

=== Dubna ===
(Dubna Machine-Building Plant Production Technical Complex Co. Ltd,)

- Dubna-2 OSA
- Dubna 4

=== Ducournau ===
(Jean-Marc Ducournau)

- Ducournau HLM.01

=== Ducrot ===
(Vittorio Ducrot)

- Ducrot SLD

=== Dudakov-Konstantinov ===
- Dudakov-Konstantinov U-1
- Dudakov-Konstantinov MU-1

=== Dudek ===
(Stan Dudek, Somerville, NJ)

- Dudek V-1 Sportplane

=== Dudek ===
(Albert Dudek, Cleveland, OH)

- Dudek-Beachey Pusher (replica Beachey-Eaton 1914 Biplane)

=== Dudek Paragliders ===
(Bydgoszcz, Poland)

- Dudek Action
- Dudek Air-Light
- Dudek Alt
- Dudek Atak
- Dudek Bi-Light
- Dudek Coden
- Dudek Colt
- Dudek Condor
- Dudek Elf
- Dudek Freeway
- Dudek Guliwer
- Dudek Hadron
- Dudek Jumbo
- Dudek Lux
- Dudek Mach 1.1
- Dudek Manta
- Dudek Marlin
- Dudek Max
- Dudek Nemo
- Dudek Nucleon
- Dudek Optic
- Dudek Orca
- Dudek Patrol
- Dudek Plasma
- Dudek Plus
- Dudek Reaction
- Dudek Rex
- Dudek Shark
- Dudek Snake
- Dudek Synthesis
- Dudek Top
- Dudek Traper
- Dudek Twix
- Dudek Universal
- Dudek Vip
- Dudek Vox
- Dudek Wezyr
- Dudek Zagzig
- Dudek Zak Speed

=== Dudley ===
- Dudley Glass Slipper

=== Dudley Watt ===
- Dudley Watt D.W.2

=== Dufaux ===
(Dufaux, Armand and Henri, Switzerland)

- Dufaux helicopter
- Dufaux triplane
- Dufaux 4
- Dufaux 5
- Dufaux fighter
- Dufaux Avion-Canon
- Dufaux C.2 Fighter

=== Dufour ===
- Dufour No.1

=== Duigan ===
- Duigan glider
- Duigan pusher biplane
- Duigan tractor biplane

=== Dudley Watt ===
- Dudley Watt D.W.2

=== Dumbravă ===
(Ioan Dumbravă)

- Dumbravă Iaşi-1

=== Dumod ===
(Dumod Corp, Opa-Locka, FL)

- Dumod I
- Dumod Liner
- Dumod Infinité I
- Dumod Infinité II

=== Duncan (aircraft constructor) ===
- Duncan Special a.k.a. DX-1 Sport

=== Dunham ===
(Erwin J Dunham, Hamburg, NY)

- Dunham 1927 Monoplane

=== Dunn ===
((William G) Dunn Mfg Co, Clarinda, IA)

- Dunn K-5 Cruzaire

=== Dunn-Tate ===
(Harry & Frank Dunn, Anderson, IN)

- Dunn-Tate 1910 Biplane

=== Dunne ===
(J. W. Dunne) see also: Burgess-Dunne

- Dunne D.1
- Dunne D.2
- Dunne D.3
- Dunne D.4
- Dunne D.5
- Dunne D.6
- Dunne D.7 (Dunne-Capper monoplane)
- Dunne D.8
- Dunne D.9
- Dunne D.10

=== Dupau ===
(Marcel Dupau)

- Dupau 12 Papy-on

=== DuPont ===
(Dupont Aerospace)

- Dupont Aerospace DP-2

=== Dupperon-Niepce-Fetterer ===
- Dupperon-Niepce-Fetterer 1916 bomber

=== Dupuy ===
(Roger Dupuy)

- Dupuy 40

=== Durand ===
(William H Durand, 84 St & McKinley Ave)

- Durand A-45
- Durand Mk V
- Durand XD-85

=== Duranton ===
- Duranton DE.01 Junior

=== Durand et Delaville ===
(Claude Durand and Delaville)

- Durand et Delaville RB.01 Beauregard

=== Durandeaux ===
(Durandeaux)

- Durandeaux D.510

=== Durant ===
( (Rex C "Cliff") Durant Aircraft Corp, Durant Field, 82 Ave at E 14 St, Oakland, CA)

- Durant Tour Plane (Standard J-1 Conversions)

=== Durban ===
(Durban Aircraft, South Africa)

- Durban Aerial II - formerly "Genair Aeriel 2", a Piel Emeraude built under licence

=== Durenleau ===
(René Durenleau, Franklin, VT)

- Durenleau A-1 Biddy Buddy

=== Durley ===
(Bill Durley)

- Durl-E-Aire- parasol wing amateur built aircraft, one built

=== Duruble ===
(Roland Duruble)

- Duruble RD-02 Edelweiss
- Duruble RD-03 Edelweiss

=== DUS ===
(Jerzy Dabrowski and Antoni Uszacki)

- DUS III Ptapta

=== Duverne-Saran ===
(Duverne & Saran)

- Duverne-Saran 01

=== Dux Factory (sometimes anglicized as Duks or Dooks) ===
- Dux Meller I (a.k.a. Duks)
- Dux Meller II
- Dux Meller III
- Dux No.2 pusher monoplane
- Dux 1917 twin pusher
- Dux Military
- Dux twin-engine
- Bleriot XI Dux

=== Dvorak ===
(George J. Dvorak, Redding, CA)

- Dvorak MiniOne

=== Dwight-Lund ===
- Dwight-Lund 1911 Aeroplane

=== Dycer ===
((Charles F & Edward A) Dycer Airport Corp, 136 St & Western Ave, Los Angeles, CA)

- Dycer Sportplane

=== Dye ===
(Elmer F Dye, Encanto, CA)

- Dye Dart Sport

=== Dye-Morrow ===
(Elmer F Dye & Ed Morrow, Encanto and San Diego, CA)

- Dye-Morrow LW

=== Dyer ===
(Stephen E Dyer, Aurora, CO)

- Dycer Dycercraft

=== Dyke ===
((John W) Dyke Aircraft, Fairborn, OH)

- Dyke JD-1 Delta
- Dyke JD-2 Manta Delta
- Dyke Stingray

=== Dyle et Bacalan ===
(Société Dyle et Bacalan à Bordeaux / Société Anonyme de Travaux Dyle et Bacalan)

- Dyle et Bacalan DB-10
- Dyle et Bacalan DB-20
- Dyle et Bacalan DB-30
- Dyle et Bacalan DB-40
- Dyle et Bacalan DB-50
- Dyle et Bacalan DB-60
- Dyle et Bacalan DB-70
- Dyle et Bacalan DB-80
- Dyle et Bacalan DB-81
- Dyle et Bacalan DB-90
- Dyle et Bacalan AB-20
- Dyle et Bacalan AB-21
- Dyle et Bacalan AB-22
- Dyle et Bacalan AB-80
- Dyle et Bacalan LH-70

=== Dyn'Aéro ===
- Dyn'Aéro CR.100
- Dyn'Aéro CR.120
- Dyn'Aéro MCR01 VLA Sportster
- Dyn'Aéro MCR01 Club
- Dyn'Aéro MCR01 ULC
- Dyn'Aéro MCR4S
- Dyn'Aéro Twin-R
- Dyn'Aéro ELA-1
- Dyn'Aéro MCR2S Ibis
- Dyn'Aéro Pickup
- Dyn'Aéro Three seat
- Dyn'Aéro Four seat
- Dyn'Aéro Four seat Performance
- Dyn'Aéro CITEC
- Dyn'Aéro MCR R180
- Dyn'Aéro MCR R180 Limousine

=== Dynali ===
(Dynali Helicopter Company)

- Dynali H2
- Dynali H2S
- Dynali H3 Easyflyer

=== Dynalifter ===
- Dynalifter DL-100

=== Dynamic OK ===
- Dynamic OK WT-9

=== Dynamic Sport ===
(Kielce, Poland)

- Dynamic Sport Climber
- Dynamic Sport Enigma
- Dynamic Sport Gravis
- Dynamic Sport Magnum
- Dynamic Sport Raven
- Dynamic Sport Rocket
- Dynamic Sport Viper

=== Dyott ===
(G.M. Dyott)

- Dyott 1913 monoplane
- Dyott Bomber

=== D'Yves Air Pub ===
(La Chapelle-en-Vexin, France)

- D'Yves Yvasion 2000
- D'Yves Mikalight
- D'Yves Titanox
- D'Yves Single-Seater Trike
- D'Yves Airmax Double-Seater Trike
- D'Yves Double-Seater Trike

=== Działowskich ===
(Stanislav Działowskich)

- Działowski D.K.D.1
- Działowski D.K.D.3
- Działowski D.K.D.4
- Działowski D.K.D.5
- Działowski D.K.D.6
- Działowski D.K.D.7
- Działowski D.K.D.8
- Działowski D.K.D.10 Aeromobil
