= Drachen =

Drachen may refer to:

- "Drachen", song by Einstürzende Neubauten from Strategies Against Architecture III 2001
- "Drachen", song by Sarah Connor from Herz Kraft Werke
- Drachen Studio Kecur, a German ultralight aircraft manufacturer based in Mettmann, North Rhine-Westphalia.
- Drachen, a type of German Kite balloon used in WW1 for artillery observation.
