= Ducrot =

Ducrot may refer to:

- Auguste-Alexandre Ducrot (1817-1882), a French general
- Ducrot SLD, an Italian fighter prototype
- Oswald Ducrot, (1930-) a French linguist
