= D'Yves Air Pub =

French aircraft manufacturer

- Company type: Privately held company
- Industry: Aerospace
- Founder: Yves Hélary
- Headquarters: La Chapelle-en-Vexin, France
- Products: Paramotors, powered parachutes
- Website: yvasion.pagesperso-orange.fr

D'Yves Air Pub is a French aircraft manufacturer based in La Chapelle-en-Vexin, founded by Yves Hélary. The company specializes in the design and manufacture of paramotors and powered parachutes in the form of kits for amateur construction and ready-to-fly aircraft for the US FAR 103 Ultralight Vehicles rules and the European Fédération Aéronautique Internationale microlight category.

Hélary has been singled out for his incremental design innovations and his individual customer service.

The company has a full line of paramotors, including the now-discontinued D'Yves Yvasion 2000 and the current production Mikalight and Titanox. Current powered parachute models include the Single-Seater Trike, Airmax Double-Seater Trike and the Double-Seater Trike.

== Aircraft ==
Summary of aircraft built by D'Yves Air Pub
Model name	First flight	Number built	Type
D'Yves Yvasion 2000	mid-2000s		Paramotor
D'Yves Mikalight	2010s		Paramotor
D'Yves Titanox	2010s		Paramotor
D'Yves Single-Seater Trike	2010s		Single seat powered parachute
D'Yves Airmax Double-Seater Trike	2010s		Two-seat powered parachute
D'Yves Double-Seater Trike	2010s		Two-seat powered parachute
