= Drachen Studio Kecur EOS 15 =

German ultralight trike wing

EOS 15

General information
- Type: Ultralight trike wing
- National origin: Germany
- Manufacturer: Drachen Studio Kecur
- Status: In production (2013)

The Drachen Studio Kecur EOS 15 is a German double-surface ultralight trike wing, designed and produced by Drachen Studio Kecur of Mettmann.

The wing is used on their own Drachen Studio Kecur Royal 912 line of trikes as well as by other ultralight aircraft manufacturers.

== Design and development ==
The wing is a cable-braced, king post-equipped hang glider-style wing designed as touring wing for two-place trikes. It comes in one size, the EOS 15, named for its metric wing area of 15 m^{2} (160 sq ft).

The wing is made from bolted-together aluminum tubing, with its double surface wing covered in Dacron sailcloth. The wing's crosstube is enclosed in the double surface. Its 10.48 m (34.4 ft) span wing uses an "A" frame weight-shift control bar and is equipped with spoilers.

== Applications ==
- Drachen Studio Kecur Royal 912

== Specifications (EOS 15) ==
Data from Bayerl

General characteristics

- Wingspan: 10.48 m (34 ft 5 in)
- Wing area: 15 m^{2} (160 sq ft)
- Gross weight: 450 kg (992 lb) maximum aircraft gross weight allowed

Performance

- Maximum speed: 150 km/h (93 mph, 81 kn)
- Cruise speed: 115 km/h (71 mph, 62 kn)
- Wing loading: 30.0 kg/m^{2} (6.1 lb/sq ft) maximum
