= Direct Fly sro =

Czech aircraft manufacturer

Direct Fly s.r.o.
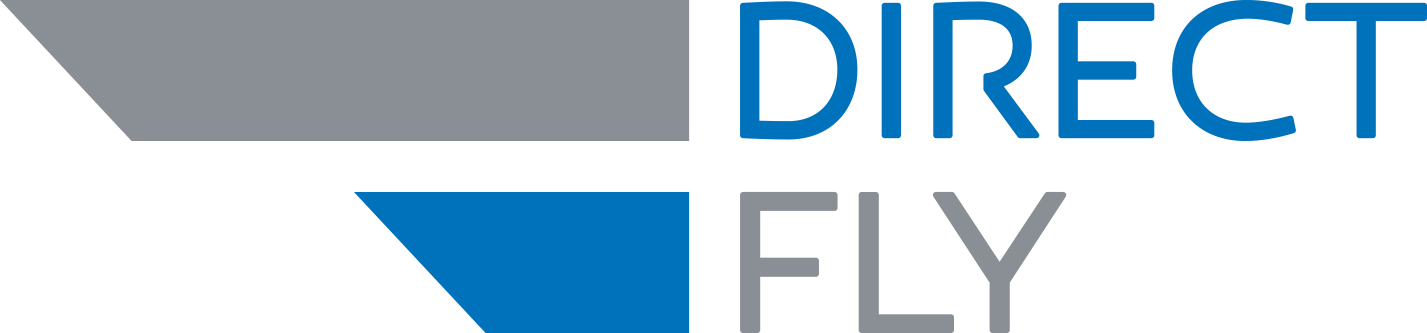
- Type: Privately held company
- Industry: Aerospace
- Founded: 2006
- Headquarters: Brno, Czech Republic
- Products: Light aircraft
- Number of employees: 30 (2026)
- Website: www.directfly.cz

Direct Fly s.r.o. (sometimes called DirectFly s.r.o.) is a Czech aircraft manufacturer currently based in Brno (LKCM Airport) and founded in 2006 in Hluk. The company specializes in the design and manufacture of ultralight aircraft in the form of ready-to-fly aircraft and kits for the Fédération Aéronautique Internationale microlight and the American light-sport aircraft categories. The organization is a Czech společnost s ručením omezeným, or private limited company.

Direct Fly was established in a part of the country noted for its aircraft manufacturing to take advantage of the existing available pool of skilled workers.

Direct Fly Alto NG

STOL Cruiser

former logo used prior to 2017

In 2008 the company had seven employees. In 2012 Jane's Information Group reported the company then had ten employees, plus seven international dealers.

By 2017 the company was building just one microlight aircraft design, the two-seat, low-wing Alto 912TG, the Direct Fly ArGO having gone out of production. The Alto has been accepted by the US Federal Aviation Administration as a light-sport aircraft.

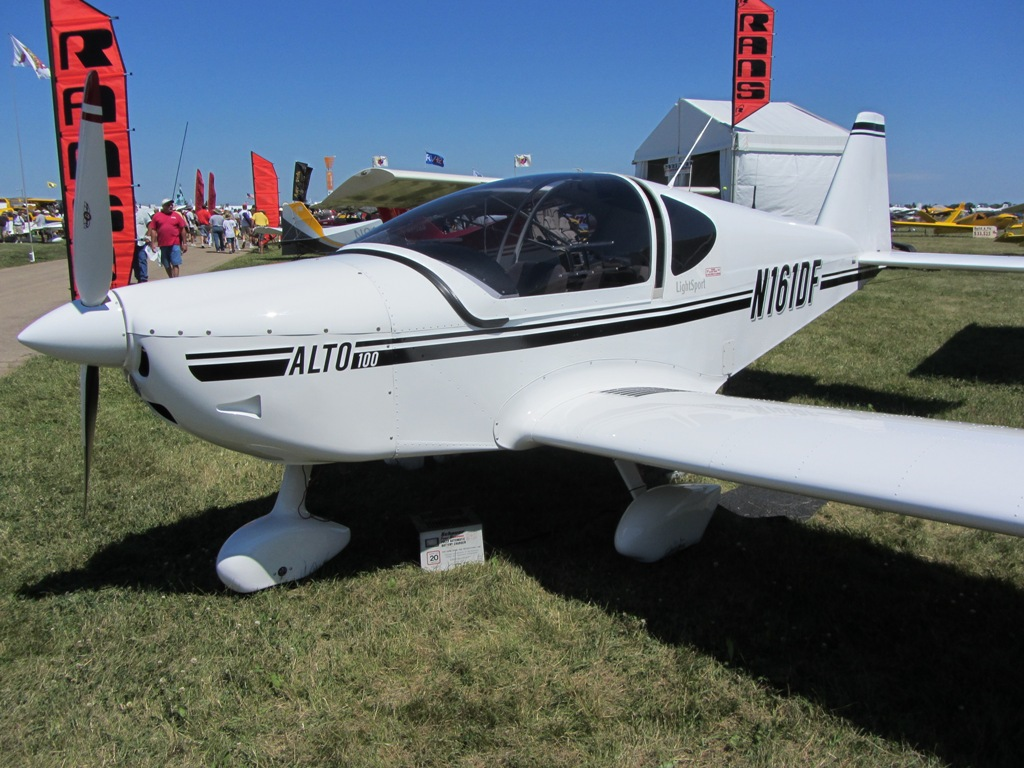
Direct Fly Alto 100

By March 2019 the company had two more designs under development, the low-wing Orange and high-wing STOL Cruiser.

The company first exhibited in the United States at the Sun 'n Fun in Lakeland, Florida, in April 2010. The company has been noted for its short wait times for aircraft ordered.

By December 2017 the company had exported at least three aircraft to the U.S. since there were three Altos registered with the US Federal Aviation Administration as light-sport aircraft.

== Alto NG ==
The Alto was originally produced as Alto 912 TG version, with a maximum takeoff weight (MTOW) of 450 kg. Since 2022, it has been replaced by the Alto NG version, which features a number of improvements and an increased MTOW of 600 kg.

== STOL Cruiser ==
The first prototype of the STOL Cruiser has been flying since 2021. It is an aircraft that combines STOL capabilities and good cruise speed with a spacious cabin and baggage compartment. The aircraft is also currently undergoing the certification process.

== Aircraft ==
Summary of aircraft built by Direct Fly
Model name	First flight	Number built	Type
Direct Fly Alto	2006	270+ (2026)	Two-seat, low-wing light sport aircraft
Direct Fly ArGO			Two-seat, high-wing light sport aircraft
Direct Fly STOL Cruiser	2021	1	Two-seat, high-wing light sport aircraft
