= D'Yves Yvasion 2000 =

French paramotor

Yvasion 2000

General information
- Type: Paramotor
- National origin: France
- Manufacturer: D'Yves Air Pub
- Designer: Yves Hélary
- Status: Production completed

The D'Yves Yvasion 2000 (English: Evasion) is a family of French paramotors that was designed by Yves Hélary and produced by D'Yves Air Pub of La Chapelle-en-Vexin for powered paragliding. Now out of production, when it was available the aircraft was supplied complete and ready-to-fly.

== Design and development ==
The Yvasion 2000 series was designed to comply with the US FAR 103 Ultralight Vehicles rules as well as European regulations. It features a paraglider-style wing, single-place accommodation and a single engine in pusher configuration with a reduction drive and a two-bladed wooden propeller. The individual models differ by the installed powerplant.

As is the case with all paramotors, take-off and landing is accomplished by foot. Inflight steering is accomplished via handles that actuate the canopy brakes, creating roll and yaw.

== Variants ==
Yvasion 2000 F
Model with a 18 hp (13 kW) Fly 130 engine in pusher configuration with a 3.3:1 ratio reduction drive and a 120 cm (47 in) diameter two-bladed wooden propeller. The fuel tank capacity is 9 litres (2.0 imp gal; 2.4 US gal).
Yvasion 2000 J1
Model with a 16 hp (12 kW) JPX D160 engine in pusher configuration with a 2.8:1 ratio reduction drive and a 120 cm (47 in) diameter two-bladed wooden propeller. The fuel tank capacity is 9 litres (2.0 imp gal; 2.4 US gal).
Yvasion 2000 J3
Model with a 18 hp (13 kW) JPX D330 engine in pusher configuration with a 2.8:1 ratio reduction drive and a 120 cm (47 in) diameter two-bladed wooden propeller. The fuel tank capacity is 9 litres (2.0 imp gal; 2.4 US gal).
Yvasion 2000 R
Model with a 16 hp (12 kW) RDM 100 engine in pusher configuration with a 3.8:1 ratio reduction drive and a 120 cm (47 in) diameter two-bladed wooden propeller. The fuel tank capacity is 9 litres (2.0 imp gal; 2.4 US gal).
Yvasion 2000 S
Model with a 18 hp (13 kW) Solo 210 engine in pusher configuration with a 2.8:1 ratio reduction drive and a 120 cm (47 in) diameter two-bladed wooden propeller. The fuel tank capacity is 9 litres (2.0 imp gal; 2.4 US gal).

== Specifications (Yvasion 2000 S) ==
Data from Bertrand

General characteristics

- Crew: one
- Empty weight: 29 kg (64 lb)
- Fuel capacity: 9 litres (2.0 imp gal; 2.4 US gal)
- Powerplant: 1 × Solo 210 single cylinder, two-stroke, air-cooled aircraft engine, with a 2.8:1 reduction drive
- Propellers: 2-bladed wooden, fixed pitch, 1.20 m (3 ft 11 in) diameter
