= Dietrich DP.III =

General information
- Type: Light passenger transport monoplane
- National origin: Germany
- Manufacturer: Dietrich-Gobiet Flugzeugwerke
- Designer: Richard Dietrich
- Status: Not flown

History
- First flight: 1920s

The Dietrich DP.III was a design for a 1920s German light passenger transport monoplane for six passengers designed by Richard Dietrich and was to be built by the Dietrich-Gobiet Flugzeugwerke as Kassel. Due to the financial problems of the company it is believed that the DP.III was not completed.

== Development ==
The DP.III was a high-wing cantilever monoplane with a conventional tail unit and a fixed tailskid landing gear. It was to be powered by an inline piston engine in the 172 to 194 kW (230-260 hp) range possibly a Benz Bz IV or Rolls-Royce Falcon. It had a crew of two in a semi-open cockpit and accommodation for six passengers in an enclosed cabin.

== Specifications ==
Data from

General characteristics

- Crew: 2
- Capacity: 6 passengers
- Length: 12.50 m (41 ft 0 in)
- Wingspan: 17.00 m (55 ft 9 in)
- Height: 3.60 m (11 ft 10 in)
- Empty weight: 1,300 kg (2,866 lb) estimated
- Max takeoff weight: 2,200 kg (4,850 lb) estimated
- Powerplant: 1 × Rolls-Royce Falcon inline piston engine, 170 kW (230 hp)

Performance

- Maximum speed: 150 km/h (93 mph, 81 kn) estimated
- Range: 950 km (590 mi, 510 nmi) estimated
- Service ceiling: 3,000 m (9,800 ft) estimated
