= Doman LZ-4 =

American helicopter

LZ-4

General information
- Type: Experimental helicopter
- National origin: United States
- Manufacturer: Doman Helicopters Inc.
- Designer: Glidden S. Doman
- Number built: 1

History
- First flight: November 1950
- Developed from: Doman LZ-2A Pelican

The Doman LZ-4 was an American eight-seat helicopter designed and developed by Doman Helicopters of Danbury, Connecticut.

== Design and development ==
Following the test flying of the Doman LZ-2A, Doman Helicopters developed an eight-seat helicopter with the designation LZ-4. The fuselage had 3 rows of double seats in the main cabin and a two-crew flight deck in the front. Large folding doors allowed for loading bulky cargo into the main compartment. The tail boom was conventional with a cranked-up rear section mounting a tail rotor, and the helicopter was supported by a four-leg undercarriage.

== Specifications (LZ-4) ==
Data from Aerofiles : Doman LZ-4, vertipedia Doman LZ-4

General characteristics

- Capacity: 8
- Length: 38 ft 1 in (11.61 m)
- Height: 11 ft 2 in (3.41 m)
- Empty weight: 2,970 lb (1,347 kg)
- Gross weight: 4,773 lb (2,165 kg)
- Max takeoff weight: 4,700 lb (2,132 kg)
- Powerplant: 1 × Lycoming SO-580-B 8-cyl air-cooled horizontally-opposed piston engine, 400 hp (300 kW) for take-off
- Main rotor diameter: 48 ft 0 in (14.64 m)
- Main rotor area: 1,809.5 sq ft (168.11 m^{2})

Performance

- Cruise speed: 78 mph (125 km/h, 67 kn)
- Range: 209 mi (336 km, 181 nmi)
- Service ceiling: 16,001 ft (4,877 m)
- Rate of climb: 790 ft/min (4 m/s)
- Disk loading: 2.60 lb/sq ft (12.68 kg/m^{2})
