= Hava Faza Dorna =

Iranian aircraft manufacturer

Hava Faza Dorna Company
- Company type: Joint stock company
- Industry: Aerospace
- Founded: 1988
- Headquarters: Hasanabad, Ray County, Iran
- Products: Light aircraft
- Website: dornaaircraft.com/en/home

Hava Faza Dorna Company (usually HF Dorna or just Dorna (transl. Crane)) is an Iranian aircraft manufacturer based in Hasanabad. The company specializes in the design and manufacture of composite light aircraft and light sport aircraft in the form of ready-to-fly aircraft.

The company was founded in 1988 and is organized as a joint stock company.

The company's Blue Bird design was awarded an Iranian type certificate and production certificate. The company also holds a Design Organization Approval Certificate.

The Free Bird is a light-sport aircraft specifically designed for the United States and other western markets that recognize this ASTM category. The company has indicated that it would like to export the aircraft and even manufacture it outside Iran. The Free Bird uses Austrian Rotax engines and Czech Woodcomp propellers.

The company is also engaged in designing a 19-seat twin-engined utility turboprop.

== Aircraft ==
Summary of aircraft built by Dorna:

- Dorna Parandeh Abi (Blue Bird)
- Dorna Free Bird, light-sport aircraft
