= Drachen Studio Kecur Royal 912 =

German ultralight trike

Royal 912

General information
- Type: Ultralight trike
- National origin: Germany
- Manufacturer: Drachen Studio Kecur
- Status: In production (2013)

The Drachen Studio Kecur Royal 912 is a German ultralight trike, designed and produced by Drachen Studio Kecur of Mettmann. The aircraft is supplied as a complete ready-to-fly-aircraft.

== Design and development ==
The Royal 912 was designed to comply with the Fédération Aéronautique Internationale microlight category, including the category's maximum gross weight of 450 kg (992 lb). The aircraft has a maximum gross weight of 450 kg (992 lb). It features a cable-braced hang glider-style high-wing, weight-shift controls, a two-seats-in-tandem open cockpit, tricycle landing gear with wheel pants and a single engine in pusher configuration.

The aircraft is made from bolted-together aluminum tubing, with its single surface wing covered in Dacron sailcloth. Its 10.48 m (34.4 ft) span wing is supported by a single tube-type kingpost and uses an "A" frame weight-shift control bar. The powerplant is a four-cylinder, air and liquid-cooled, four-stroke, dual-ignition 80 hp (60 kW) Rotax 912 or 100 hp (75 kW) Rotax 912S engine. The aircraft has an empty weight of 230 kg (507 lb) and a gross weight of 450 kg (992 lb), giving a useful load of 220 kg (485 lb). With full fuel of 55 litres (12 imp gal; 15 US gal) the payload is 180 kg (397 lb).

The aircraft carriage is manufactured under sub-contract in Slovenia. A number of different wings can be fitted to the basic carriage, but the standard wing is the Drachen Studio Kecur EOS 15 with a wing area of 15 m^{2} (160 sq ft) and which is equipped with spoilers.

== Specifications (Royal 912) ==
Data from Bayerl

General characteristics

- Crew: one
- Capacity: one passenger
- Wingspan: 10.48 m (34 ft 5 in)
- Wing area: 15 m^{2} (160 sq ft)
- Empty weight: 230 kg (507 lb)
- Gross weight: 450 kg (992 lb)
- Fuel capacity: 55 litres (12 imp gal; 15 US gal)
- Powerplant: 1 × Rotax 912UL four cylinder, liquid and air-cooled, four stroke aircraft engine or twin cylinder, liquid-cooled, two stroke aircraft engine, 60 kW (80 hp)
- Propellers: 3-bladed composite

Performance

- Maximum speed: 150 km/h (93 mph, 81 kn)
- Cruise speed: 115 km/h (71 mph, 62 kn)
- Stall speed: 62 km/h (39 mph, 33 kn)
- Rate of climb: 6.5 m/s (1,280 ft/min)
- Wing loading: 30.0 kg/m^{2} (6.1 lb/sq ft)
