= Dorna Parandeh Abi =

Low-wing single-engine monoplane built in Iran

Prandeh Abi

General information
- Type: Two-seat light aircraft and trainer
- National origin: Iran
- Manufacturer: H F Dorna Company, Tehran
- Designer: Mohammad Hassan Karami
- Number built: 28+

History
- First flight: 27 July 1998

The Dorna D-139 Parandeh Abi (English: Blue Bird) is a low-wing single-engine monoplane built from composite materials in Iran. It is a recreational and training aircraft with side-by-side seating.

== Design and development ==
The design of the Parandeh Abi, Blue Bird in English, was begun in 1994 and the first flight was on 27 July 1998. It is a conventionally laid out low wing single-engine monoplane, built entirely from composite materials and seating two side-by-side. Its two spar wings and single spar horizontal tail are rectangular in plan. The wing carries 2.5° of dihedral and the tips are slightly upturned. Plain flaps fill the trailing edges inboard of the ailerons. The elevators are horn balanced, as is the rudder. Together, the fin and rudder are straight tapered, with a small dorsal fillet.

The Parandeh Abi is powered by a Rotax 914 F3 horizontally opposed four-cylinder engine driving a thee-bladed propeller. Its fixed, self-sprung steel cantilever tricycle undercarriage is attached to the fuselage. All wheels have speed fairings. In early production aircraft, access to the cabin was via the top hinged, upward opening canopy, but later examples have forward hinged doors reaching down almost to the wing. The doors contain a framed window, though the total cabin transparency is noticeably reduced. All models have a pair of small, fixed windows in the tapering fuselage behind the seats, where there is a baggage compartment. The aircraft can be equipped with either a stick or yoke for primary control. Other differences between early and later production models include improved engine cooling with the addition of chin and cheek air intakes, enlarged rudder horn balances, tailplane root fillets and fluted skinning on the ailerons and rudder.

The design was type certified to JAR-VLA standards.

Dorna are also developing a version to meet US LSA requirements, called the Parandeh Sefid or White Bird in English. This differs from the Parandeh Abi chiefly in its engine, which may be either an 84.5 kW (113.3 hp) Rotax 914 UL or a 60 kW (80 hp) Rotax 912 UL. Estimated performance with the 914 UL is similar to that of the Parandeh Abi, though the range is less as a result of a lower fuel capacity.

By the end of 2012 the company's website was gone and the domain was for sale. The company may no longer be in business.

== Operational history ==
Production of the Parandeh Abi began in 2001 with orders for 5 from Iranian flying clubs. By March 2006 Dorna had orders for 14 and options on another 30 and by November 2008 28 had been built. As well as supplying clubs and training centres, Parandeh Albis also went to the Iranian Police and to the Civil Aviation Organisation.

In 2005 it seemed possible that the aircraft might enter the South African or wider markets. Aviation Advantage of Gauteng sought to buy some complete and to obtain a licence for local manufacture or assembly.

== Specifications (Parandeh Abi) ==
Data from Jane's All the World's Aircraft 2010-11

General characteristics

- Crew: one
- Capacity: one passenger
- Length: 6.17 m (20 ft 3 in)
- Wingspan: 9.45 m (31 ft 0 in)
- Height: 2.70 m (8 ft 10 in)
- Wing area: 11.06 m^{2} (119.0 sq ft) gross
- Airfoil: NACA 63-215
- Empty weight: 490 kg (1,080 lb)
- Max takeoff weight: 750 kg (1,653 lb)
- Fuel capacity: 120 L (26.4 Imp gal, 31.7 US gal)
- Powerplant: 1 × Rotax 914 F3 turbocharged flat four, air- and water-cooled
- Propellers: 3-bladed MT-Propeller MTV-6-A/172-8, 1.72 m (5 ft 8 in) diameter

Performance

- Maximum speed: 282 km/h (175 mph, 152 kn) at 4,267 m (14,000 ft)
- Cruise speed: 161 km/h (100 mph, 87 kn) economical, at 3,658 m (12,000 ft)
- Stall speed: 83 km/h (52 mph, 45 kn) sea level, flaps down
- Never exceed speed: 321 km/h (199 mph, 173 kn)
- Range: 1,094 km (680 mi, 591 nmi) with maximum fuel
- Service ceiling: 4,265 m (13,993 ft)
- Rate of climb: 3.8 m/s (750 ft/min) at sea level

== See also ==
- Dorna Free Bird, light sport aircraft
