= Driggs Dart =

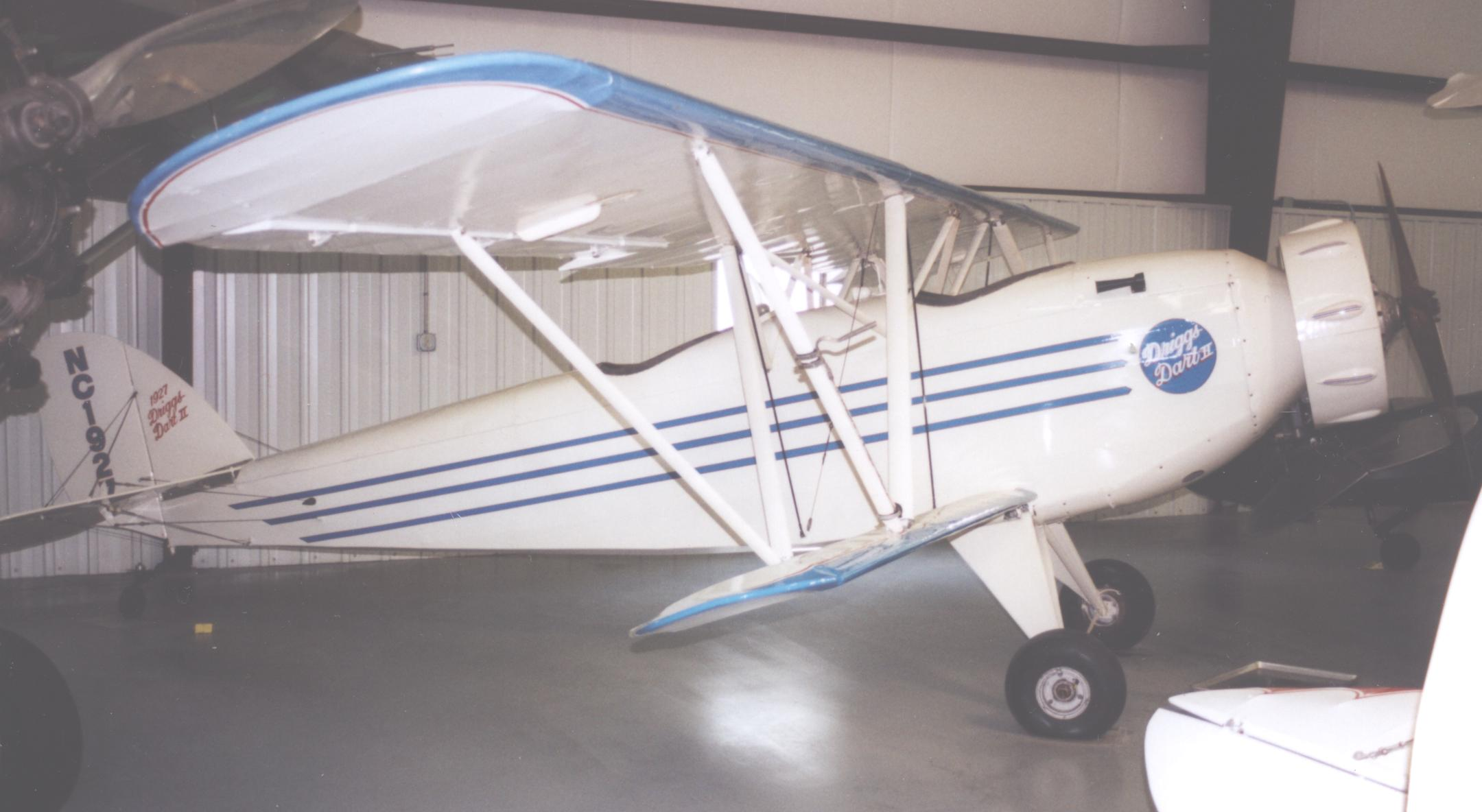
- A Salmson-powered Dart II preserved airworthy at the Historic Aircraft Restoration Museum near St Louis, Missouri in June 2006. Note the sesquiplane layout with stub lower wing.

General information
- Type: light sporting aircraft
- National origin: United States
- Manufacturer: Driggs Aircraft
- Designer: Ivan Howard Driggs
- Status: 1 airworthy survivor
- Primary user: private pilots
- Number built: approx 10

History
- First flight: 1926

The Driggs Dart was an American-built light sporting aircraft of the late 1920s.

== Development ==
Ivan Driggs designed the Dart I single-seat high-wing monoplane in 1926. In 1927 he developed the design into the two-seat Dart II, which was a sesquiplane - a biplane whose lower wing area is less than 50% of the area of the upper wing.

== Operational history ==
Three examples of the Dart I monoplane were constructed and the type won the 1926 Ford Air Tour category for light planes. One was tested by the U.S. Army Air Corps as an observation aircraft, but no orders were received.

The Dart II sesquiplane followed in 1927, at least four examples being built by Driggs and some further planes by amateur constructors from plans during the early 1930s. A Dart II is maintained in airworthy condition by the Historic Aircraft Restoration Museum at Dauster Field Creve Coeur, Missouri near St Louis.

== Variants ==
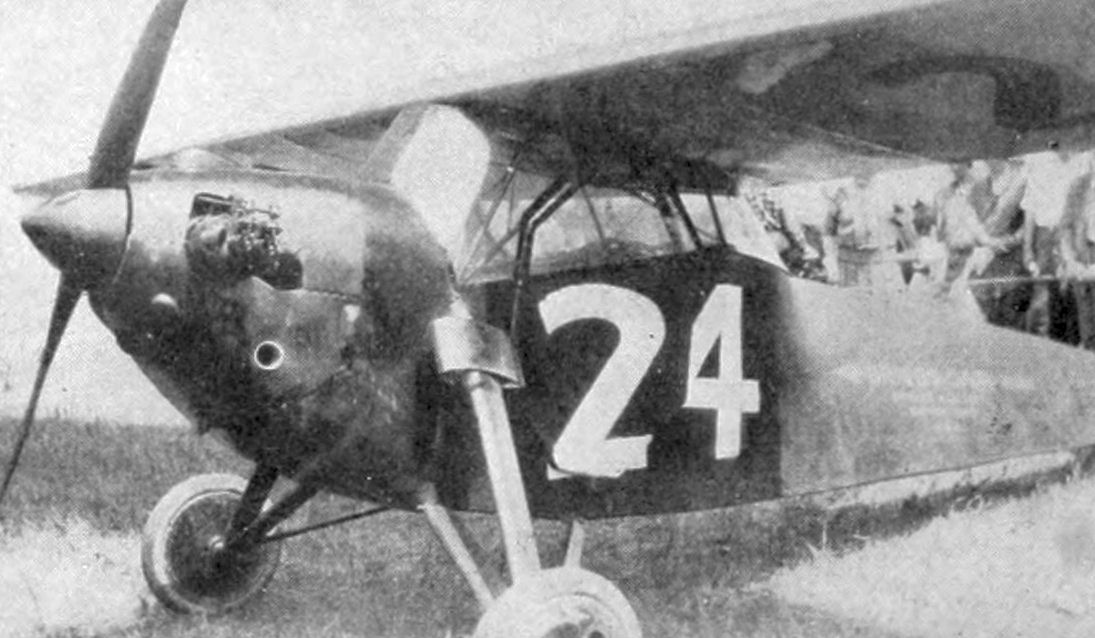
Driggs Dart I photo from Aero Digest October 1926

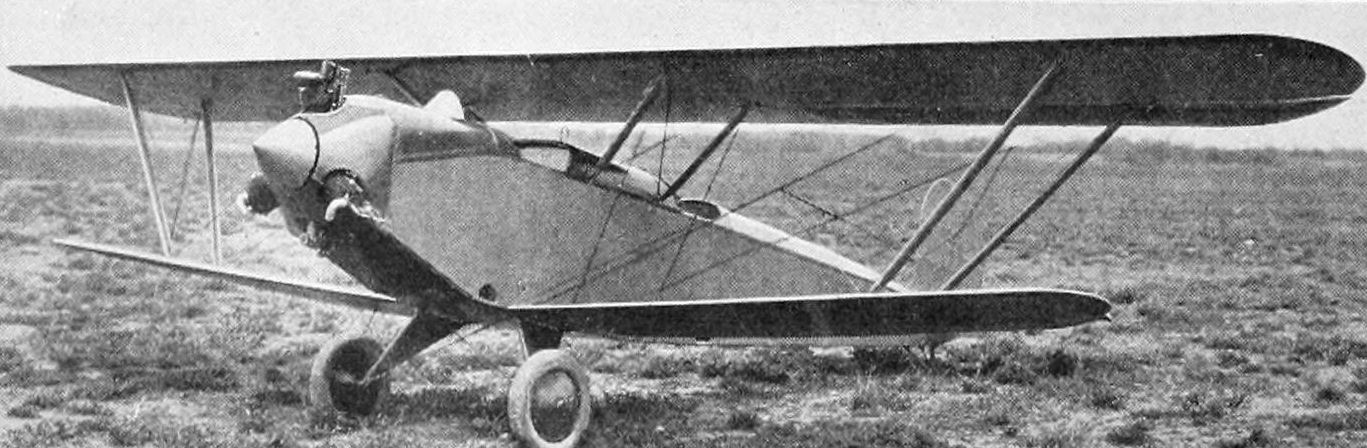
Driggs Dart II photo from Aero Digest June 1927

Dart I
Single-seat parasol monoplane powered by a 35 hp (26 kW) Anzani 3 air-cooled radial engine.

Dart II
Two-seat sesquiplane powered by a 35 hp (26 kW) Anzani 3 or Salmson AD.9 air-cooled radial piston engine.

== Specifications (Dart II Anzani engine) ==
Data from Jane's all the World's Aircraft 1928

General characteristics

- Crew: 2
- Upper wingspan: 28 ft 0 in (8.53 m)
- Lower wingspan: 22 ft 0 in (6.7 m)
- Height: 6 ft 6 in (1.98 m)
- Wing area: 140 sq ft (13 m^{2})
- Empty weight: 450 lb (204 kg)
- Gross weight: 820 lb (372 kg)
- Powerplant: 1 × Anzani 3 -cylinder air-cooled radial piston engine, 35 hp (26 kW)
- Propellers: 2-bladed fixed pitch propeller

Performance

- Maximum speed: 85 mph (137 km/h, 74 kn)
- Cruise speed: 80 mph (130 km/h, 70 kn)
- Landing speed: 30 mph (26 kn; 48 km/h)
- Range: 250 mi (400 km, 220 nmi)
- Service ceiling: 18,000 ft (5,500 m)
- Rate of climb: 550 ft/min (2.8 m/s)
- Wing loading: 5.8 lb/sq ft (28 kg/m^{2})
- Power/mass: 0.0526 hp/lb (0.0865 kW/kg)
