= Direct Fly ArGO =

Czech ultralight aircraft

ArGO

General information
- Type: Ultralight aircraft and Light-sport aircraft
- National origin: Czech Republic
- Manufacturer: Direct Fly sro
- Status: Production completed (2017)

History
- Introduction date: 2011

The Direct Fly ArGO is a Czech ultralight and light-sport aircraft, designed and produced by Direct Fly sro of Hluk, introduced at the Blois fly-in show in France, in 2011. When it was available the aircraft was supplied complete and ready-to-fly.

== Design and development ==
The ArGO was designed to comply with the Fédération Aéronautique Internationale (FAI) microlight rules and US light-sport aircraft (LSA) rules, with different versions at different gross weights for each category. It features a strut-braced high-wing, an enclosed cabin with two-seats-in-side-by-side configuration accessed by doors, fixed tricycle landing gear and a single engine in tractor configuration.

The aircraft fuselage is made from welded steel tubing covered in aluminum sheet. The flying surfaces are made from aluminum sheet. Its 9.00 m (29.5 ft) span wing has an area of 9.90 m^{2} (106.6 sq ft) and mounts Fowler flaps. Standard engines available are the 80 hp (60 kW) Rotax 912UL and the 100 hp (75 kW) Rotax 912ULS four-stroke powerplants.

As of February 2017, the design does not appear on the Federal Aviation Administration's list of approved special light-sport aircraft.

== Variants ==
arGO ULL
Model with a gross weight of 472.5 kg (1,042 lb) for the FAI microlight category.
arGO LSA/ELSA
Model with a gross weight of 575 kg (1,268 lb) for the US LSA category.

== Specifications (ArGO ULL) ==
Data from Tacke and manufacturer

General characteristics

- Crew: one
- Capacity: one passenger
- Wingspan: 9.00 m (29 ft 6 in)
- Height: 2.25 m (7 ft 5 in)
- Wing area: 9.90 m^{2} (106.6 sq ft)
- Empty weight: 282 kg (622 lb)
- Gross weight: 472.5 kg (1,042 lb)
- Fuel capacity: 100 litres (22 imp gal; 26 US gal)
- Powerplant: 1 × Rotax 912ULS four cylinder, liquid and air-cooled, four stroke aircraft engine, 75 kW (101 hp)
- Propellers: 3-bladed composite

Performance

- Maximum speed: 270 km/h (170 mph, 150 kn)
- Cruise speed: 200 km/h (120 mph, 110 kn)
- Stall speed: 62 km/h (39 mph, 33 kn) with full flaps
- Rate of climb: 6.2 m/s (1,220 ft/min)
- Wing loading: 47.7 kg/m^{2} (9.8 lb/sq ft)
