= Doman LZ-2A Pelican =

Helicopter

LZ-2A Pelican

General information
- Type: Experimental helicopter
- National origin: United States
- Manufacturer: Doman Helicopters
- Number built: 1

History
- First flight: 1949
- Developed into: Doman LZ-4

The Doman LZ-2A Pelican was an American five-seat helicopter designed and developed by Doman Helicopters of Danbury, Connecticut.

== Design and development ==
Following the test flying of a Doman-designed rotor on a modified Sikorsky R-6 (designated the LZ-1A by Doman) the company developed a five-seat helicopter to use the rotor. Little information is available on the LZ-2A other than it was developed into the larger eight-seat Doman LZ-4, the LZ-4 was the first helicopter designed completely by the company which indicates that the LZ-2A was perhaps a further development of the Sikorsky-based LZ-1. The LZ-2A Pelican was powered by a 245 hp (183 kW) Franklin engine.

== Specifications ==
Data from www.aerofiles.com

General characteristics

- Capacity: 5
- Length: 36 ft 4 in (11.07 m)
- Powerplant: 1 × Franklin , 245 hp (183 kW)
- Main rotor diameter: 45 ft 2 in (13.77 m)

Performance

- Maximum speed: 85 mph (137 km/h, 74 kn)
- Cruise speed: 75 mph (121 km/h, 65 kn)
- Range: 220 mi (350 km, 190 nmi)
