= DSK Airmotive Hawk =

DSK-1 Hawk and DSK-2 Golden Hawk

General information
- Type: Recreational aircraft
- Manufacturer: Homebuilt
- Designer: Richard Killingsworth

History
- First flight: 26 May 1973

The DSK Airmotive DSK-1 Hawk was an unusual homebuilt aircraft designed in the United States in the early 1970s. While the design itself was utterly conventional - a single-seat low-wing cantilever monoplane with fixed tricycle undercarriage - its method of construction was not, since the DSK-1 Hawk used a surplus 200 US Gal military drop tank as its fuselage. Designer Richard Killingsworth sold over 250 sets of plans.

== Development ==
The DSK-1 featured "drooping ailerons" that acted as flaps for short field operations.

== Variants ==
A follow-on design, the DSK-2 Golden Hawk with a more conventional fuselage for builders who could not obtain a suitable drop tank. This was expected to fly in 1976, but on 12 April 1975, Killingsworth was killed when the Hawk prototype crashed shortly after takeoff.

== Specifications (DSK-1) ==
Data from Jane's All the World's Aircraft 1980–81

General characteristics

- Crew: One pilot
- Length: 15 ft 0 in (4.57 m)
- Wingspan: 20 ft 4 1/2 in (6.21 m)
- Height: 6 ft 0 in (1.83 m)
- Wing area: 64 sq ft (5.9 m^{2})
- Aspect ratio: 6.42:1
- Airfoil: Clark Y
- Empty weight: 525 lb (238 kg)
- Gross weight: 893 lb (405 kg)
- Fuel capacity: 9 US gal (7.5 imp gal; 34 L)
- Powerplant: 1 × Lycoming O-145-B2 air-cooled flat-four engine, 65 hp (48 kW)
- Propellers: 2-bladed McCauley fixed-pitch propeller, 5 ft 3 in (1.60 m) diameter

Performance

- Maximum speed: 146 mph (235 km/h, 127 kn)
- Cruise speed: 110 mph (180 km/h, 96 kn) (econ cruise)
- Stall speed: 45–50 mph (72–80 km/h, 39–43 kn) (flaps down)
- Range: 550 mi (890 km, 480 nmi)
- Service ceiling: 12,000 ft (3,700 m)
- Rate of climb: 1,500 ft/min (7.6 m/s)
