= Dietrich DP.VII =

General information
- Type: Two-seat touring monoplane
- National origin: Germany
- Manufacturer: Dietrich Flugzeugwerke
- Designer: Richard Dietrich
- Number built: 6

History
- First flight: 1920s

The Dietrich DP.VII was a 1920s German two-seat touring monoplane designed by Richard Dietrich and built by the Dietrich Flugzeugwerke in Kassel, Germany.

== Development ==
The DP.VII was a low-wing braced monoplane powered by a Haacke lightweight flat-two piston engine. A training variant the DP.VIIa had a larger Siemens-Halske radial engine.

== Specifications ==
Data from

General characteristics

- Crew: 2
- Length: 5.40 m (17 ft 9 in)
- Wingspan: 8.00 m (26 ft 3 in)
- Height: 1.95 m (6 ft 5 in)
- Wing area: 10.60 m^{2} (114.1 sq ft)
- Empty weight: 180 kg (397 lb) estimated
- Max takeoff weight: 340 kg (750 lb) estimated
- Powerplant: 1 × Haacke flat-four piston engine

Performance

- Maximum speed: 115 km/h (71 mph, 62 kn) estimated
- Range: 350 km (220 mi, 190 nmi) estimated
- Service ceiling: 2,400 m (7,900 ft) estimated
