= Dorna Free Bird =

Iranian light aircraft

Free Bird

General information
- Type: Light-sport aircraft
- National origin: Iran
- Manufacturer: Hava Faza Dorna Co.
- Status: In production (2017)

The Dorna Free Bird is an Iranian light-sport aircraft, designed and produced by Hava Faza Dorna Co. of Hasanabad. The aircraft is supplied complete and ready-to-fly.

== Design and development ==
The Free Bird was designed to comply with the US light-sport aircraft rules. It features a cantilever low-wing, an enclosed cabin with two-seats-in-side-by-side configuration accessed by doors, fixed tricycle landing gear, with wheel pants and a single engine in tractor configuration.

The aircraft structure is made entirely from composite material, with the fuselage a monocoque design. Its 9.45 m (31.0 ft) wing has an area of 11.06 m^{2} (119.0 sq ft), is built with dual spars and features winglets. It has a low-mounted horizontal stabilizer with a single spar. Both the seats and the rudder pedals are adjustable for pilot height. The cabin is 107 cm (42 in) in width. The standard engine used is the Austrian 100 hp (75 kW) Rotax 912ULS, four-stroke powerplant, driving a Czech-built Woodcomp three-bladed, ground adjustable propeller.

As of February 2017, the design does not appear on the Federal Aviation Administration's list of approved special light-sport aircraft.

== Specifications (Free Bird) ==
Data from Tacke

General characteristics

- Crew: one
- Capacity: one passenger
- Wingspan: 9.45 m (31 ft 0 in)
- Wing area: 11.06 m^{2} (119.0 sq ft)
- Empty weight: 380 kg (838 lb)
- Gross weight: 600 kg (1,323 lb)
- Fuel capacity: 70 litres (15 imp gal; 18 US gal)
- Powerplant: 1 × Rotax 912ULS four cylinder, liquid and air-cooled, four stroke aircraft engine, 75 kW (101 hp)
- Propellers: 3-bladed Woodcomp ground adjustable

Performance

- Maximum speed: 220 km/h (140 mph, 120 kn)
- Stall speed: 64 km/h (40 mph, 35 kn)
- Rate of climb: 5 m/s (980 ft/min)
- Wing loading: 54.2 kg/m^{2} (11.1 lb/sq ft)

== See also ==
- Dorna Blue Bird
