= Driggs-Johnson DJ-1 Bumblebee =

DJ-1 Bumblebee
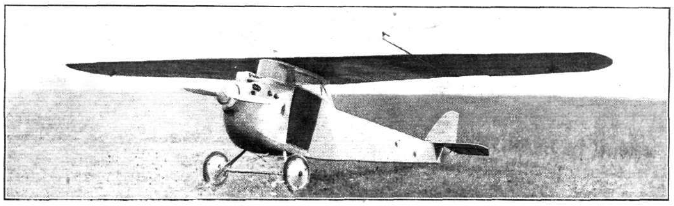

General information
- Type: Single seat sport aircraft
- National origin: US
- Manufacturer: Johnson Airplane & Supply Co, Dayton
- Designer: Ivan H. Driggs
- Number built: at least 2, about 20 including later variants

History
- First flight: 1924
- Variant: Driggs Dart

The Driggs-Johnson DJ-1 Bumblebee was a single engine, low power, single seat, parasol wing sports monoplane built in the US in 1924. It and its immediate development the Driggs Dart 1 had some competition successes; the design was further developed into two seat sesquiplanes known as the Driggs Dart 2 and Skylark. In all, about twenty were built.

== Design and development ==
The Bumblebee was designed by Ivan Driggs and built by the Johnson Airplane Company. It had advanced features: cantilever monoplanes were uncommon in the 1920s, steel tube framed lightplanes novel and enclosed cockpits rare. Its parasol wing had two spars of laminated spruce, the number of laminations decreasing outboard, and a 0.0625 in (1.59 mm) birch skin from the leading edge to the rear spar. Behind this the wing was fabric covered, as were the steel framed ailerons. In plan the wing was tapered with rounded tips.

The wing was attached to the fuselage with four cabane struts on each side, plus one sloping downwards aft centrally. The Bumblebee was powered by a 28 hp (21 kW) Henderson four cylinder engine, carefully cowled with a cooling air inlet beneath the drive shaft of the two blade propeller. The fuselage was built from internally wire braced welded steel tubes, a method user by Fokker aircraft but unfamiliar on light planes. The forward fuselage including engine, cockpit and wing mounting was rectangular in cross-section, becoming triangular, vertex up, aft. The pilot sat under the forward part of the wing not in an open cockpit as usual at the time but surrounded by curved celluloid sheet, attached to the cabane struts, which extended upwards vertically from the fuselage to the wing underside but sloping aft. There was a celluloid window in the wing over his head to provide upward vision. Access to the cockpit was via a port side door.

The empennage of the Bumblebee was, like the fuselage, steel framed. Its straight edged, braced tailplane and split elevators were mounted on top of the fuselage; the fin had a curved leading edge, the rudder moving in an elevator cut-out. The undercarriage was of the fixed, conventional type, with mainwheels on a single axle, each side attached to the fuselage by a single streamlined strut.

The first DJ-1 flew in 1924, with the Henderson engine. Some images show it without its cockpit transparencies. On its earliest outings it was referred to as the Driggs-Johnson Jimmie. A developed version, the Driggs Dart 1, was flown in 1926; powered by a 35 hp (26 kW) Anzani engine, this had a maximum speed of 95 mph (153 km/h), though it was later fitted with a 28 hp (21 kW) Wright-Morehouse engine.

== Operational history ==
At least two DJ-1s were built. The first of these won the race sponsored by the Dayton Daily News in early October 1924 and came second in both the speed and efficiency competition and a cross country race for the Rickenbacker trophy. The second was sold to the US Army and was fitted with slots and flaps. The Wright-Morehouse powered Dart 1 received a lightplane prize in the 1926 Ford Air Tour, despite failing to complete the course, as it was the only lightplane competing.

== Variants ==
Driggs-Johnson DJ-1
1924 prototype.
Driggs Dart 1
1926 development powered by 35 hp (26 kW) Anzani engine, later by a 28 hp (21 kW) Wright-Morehouse. Revised undercarriage with three struts per side.

== Specifications (DJ-1) ==
Data from Flight 13 November 1924, p.722

General characteristics

- Crew: One
- Wingspan: 27 ft 0 in (8.23 m)
- Wing area: 70 sq ft (6.5 m^{2})
- Aspect ratio: 9.8
- Airfoil: USA 45
- Empty weight: 326 lb (148 kg)
- Gross weight: 511 lb (232 kg)
- Powerplant: 1 × Henderson 4-cylinder air-cooled 80 cu in (1.30 L), 28 hp (21 kW)
- Propellers: 2-bladed

Performance

- Maximum speed: 85 mph (137 km/h, 74 kn) approximately
- Wing loading: 7.3 lb/sq ft (36 kg/m^{2})
