= Dova DV-1 Skylark =

Czech ultarlight aircraft

DV-1 Skylark
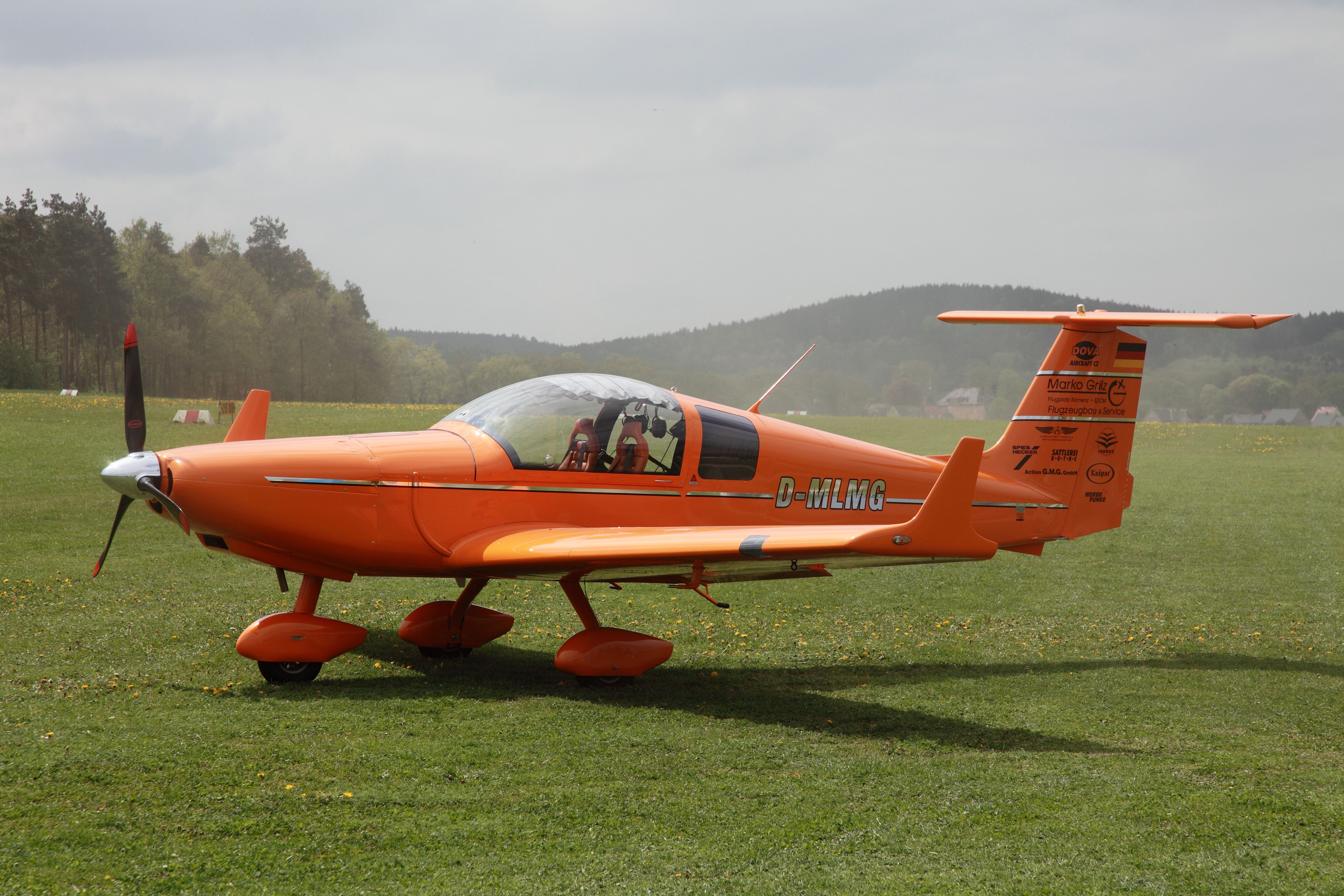

General information
- Type: Ultralight aircraft and Light-sport aircraft
- National origin: Czech Republic
- Manufacturer: Dova Aircraft
- Status: In production

The Dova DV-1 Skylark is a Czech ultralight and light-sport aircraft produced by Dova Aircraft of Paskov. The aircraft is supplied as a kit for amateur construction or as a complete ready-to-fly-aircraft.

== Design and development ==
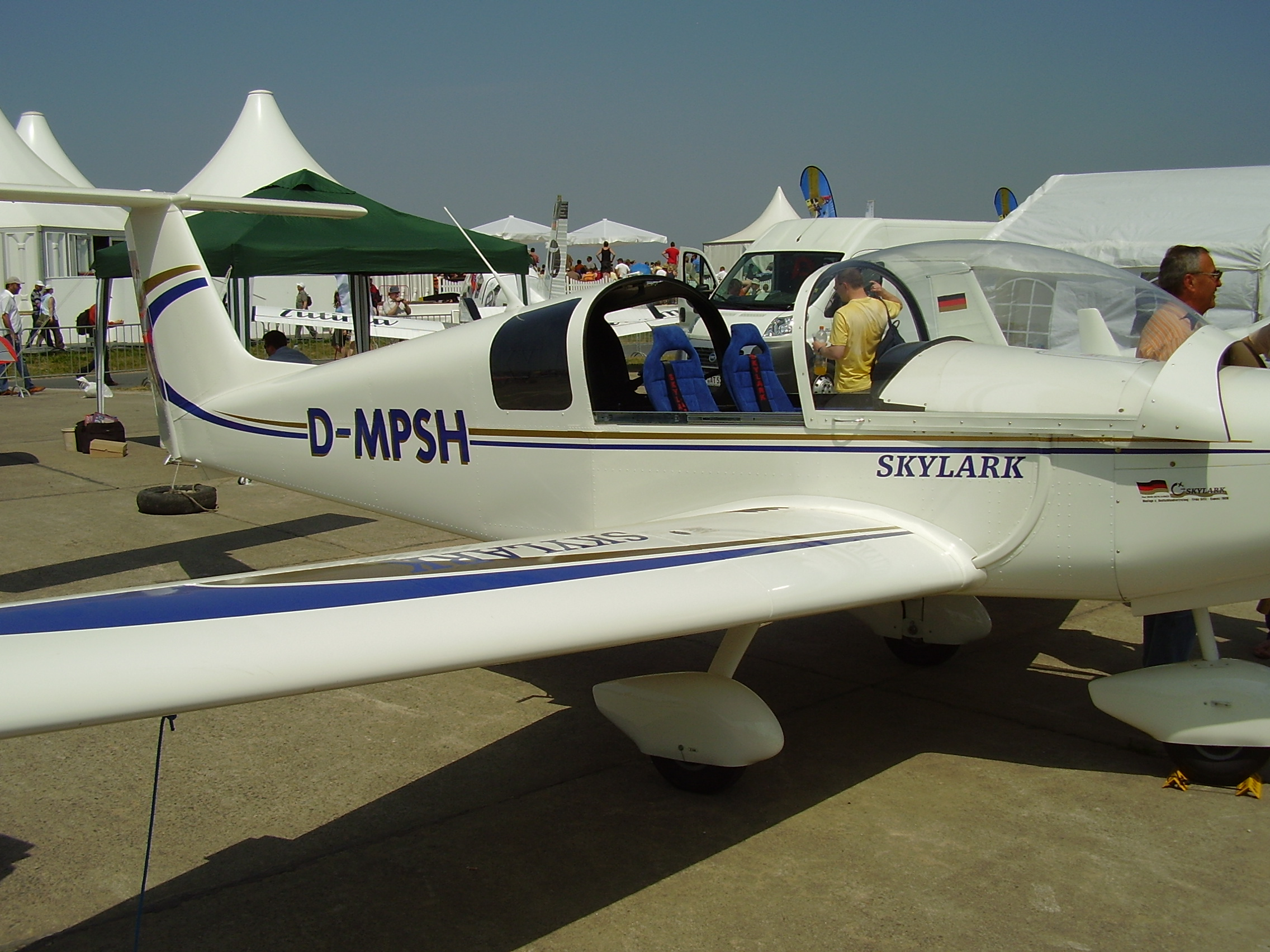
Skylark showing canopy operation

The DV-1 was designed to comply with the Fédération Aéronautique Internationale microlight rules and US light-sport aircraft rules. It features a cantilever low-wing, a T-tail, a two-seats-in-side-by-side configuration enclosed cockpit under a bubble canopy, fixed tricycle landing gear with wheel pants and a single engine in tractor configuration.

The aircraft is made from aluminum sheet. Its 8.14 m (26.7 ft) span wing has an area of 9.44 m^{2} (101.6 sq ft) and is equipped with flaps and winglets. Standard engines available are the 80 hp (60 kW) Rotax 912UL, 100 hp (75 kW) Rotax 912ULS, 115 hp (86 kW) turbocharged Rotax 914 and the BMW 1100 four-stroke powerplants.

The design is an accepted Federal Aviation Administration special light-sport aircraft.

== Operational history ==
By February 2017 seven examples had been registered in the United States with the Federal Aviation Administration.

== Variants ==
DV-1 Skylark
Model with a T-tail and winglets.
DV-2 Infinity
Model with a cruciform tail and no winglets. It is almost 20 km/h (12 mph) faster than the DV-1.

== Specifications (DV-1 Skylark) ==
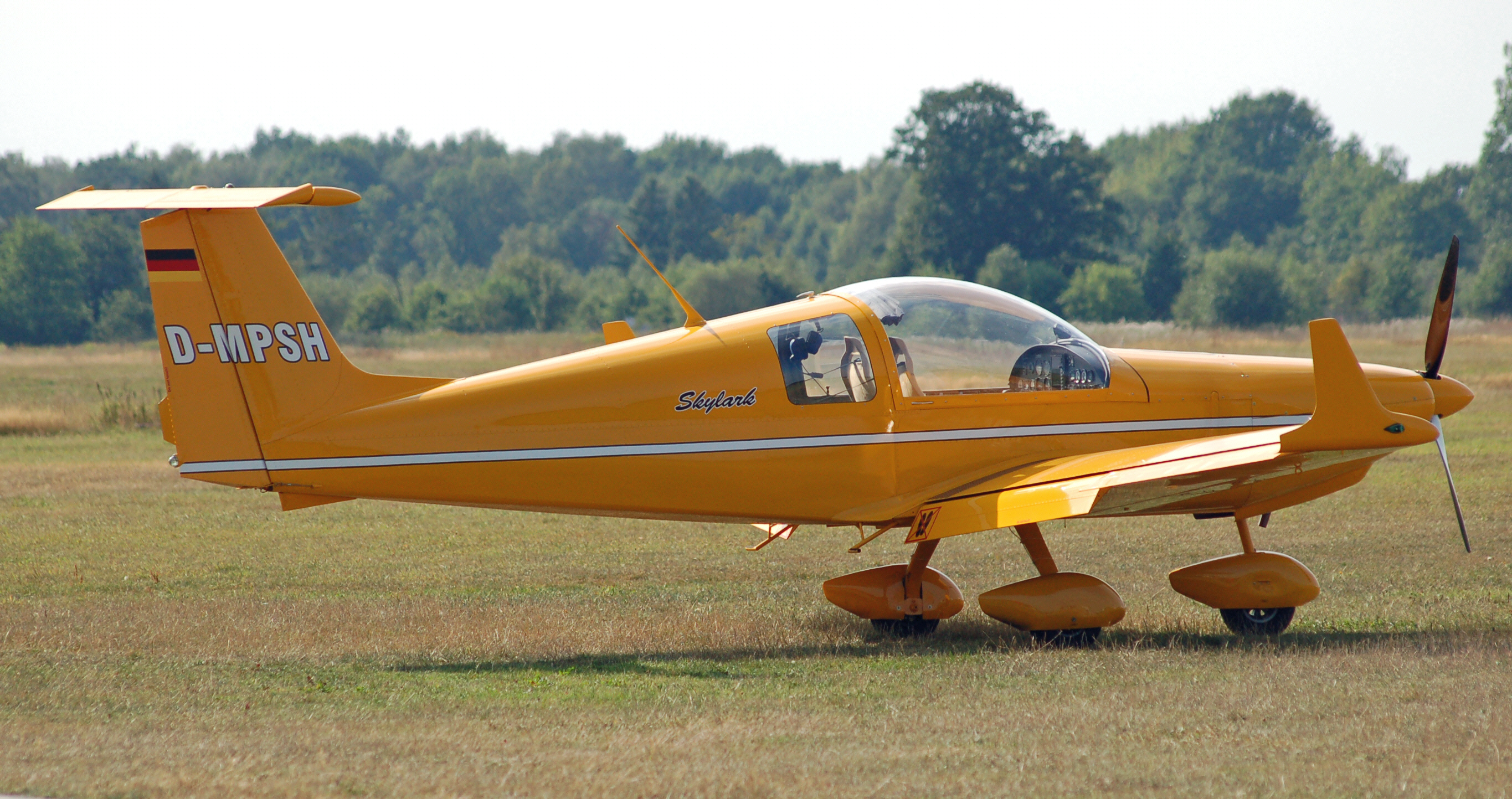
Dova DV-1 Skylark

Data from Bayerl and manufacturer

General characteristics

- Crew: one
- Capacity: one passenger
- Length: 6.62 m (21 ft 9 in)
- Wingspan: 8.14 m (26 ft 8 in)
- Height: 2.23 m (7 ft 4 in)
- Wing area: 9.44 m^{2} (101.6 sq ft)
- Empty weight: 297 kg (655 lb)
- Gross weight: 472.5 kg (1,042 lb)
- Fuel capacity: 90 litres (20 imp gal; 24 US gal)
- Powerplant: 1 × Rotax 912ULS four cylinder, liquid and air-cooled, four stroke aircraft engine, 75 kW (101 hp)

Performance

- Maximum speed: 240 km/h (150 mph, 130 kn)
- Cruise speed: 210 km/h (130 mph, 110 kn)
- Stall speed: 64 km/h (40 mph, 35 kn) flaps down
- Never exceed speed: 280 km/h (170 mph, 150 kn)
- Range: 1,000 km (620 mi, 540 nmi)
- Service ceiling: 3,650 m (11,980 ft)
- g limits: +4/-2
- Rate of climb: 8 m/s (1,600 ft/min)
- Wing loading: 50.1 kg/m^{2} (10.3 lb/sq ft)
