= Direct Fly Alto =

Czech light aircraft

Alto
- Alto 100

General information
- Other names: Alto NG, Alto 912 TG
- Type: Light sport aircraft
- National origin: Czech Republic
- Manufacturer: Direct Fly s.r.o.
- Status: In production
- Primary user: Ukrainian Air Force
- Number built: 270+ (2026)

History
- Introduction date: 2008

The Direct Fly Alto (English: High) is a Czech ultralight and light-sport aircraft, designed and produced by Direct Fly s.r.o. of Hluk. The aircraft is supplied as a standard or quick-build kit for amateur construction or as a complete ready-to-fly-aircraft.

== Design and development ==
The aircraft was designed to comply with the Fédération Aéronautique Internationale microlight class and US light-sport aircraft rules. It features a cantilever low-wing, a two-seats-in-side-by-side configuration enclosed cockpit, fixed tricycle landing gear or optionally conventional landing gear and a single engine in tractor configuration.

The aircraft is constructed from aluminum sheet, with a wing that has a span of 8.10 m (26.6 ft) and an area of 10.14 m^{2} (109.1 sq ft). Standard engines available are the 80 hp (60 kW) Rotax 912UL, the 100 hp (75 kW) Rotax 912ULS , the 100 hp (75 kW) Rotax 912iS, the 120 hp (89 kW) and Edge Performance. Older planes sometimes used the 120 hp (89 kW) Jabiru 3300 four-stroke powerplants.

A Magnum 501 rocket powered parachute system is under development for the aircraft.

The Alto TG design was issued a Czech type certificate on 15 July 2008 and produced until 2022. The Alto NG replaced the original model in production in 2022.

In 2011 the design was accepted as a Federal Aviation Administration approved special light-sport aircraft.

Alto NG in the USA

The Alto NG replaced the original TG model in production in 2022.

== Operational history ==
The aircraft was introduced to the US light sport market at the 2010 Sun 'n Fun airshow.

In July 2022 there were five Altos registered with the US Federal Aviation Administration.

In late June 2026, the Ukrainian Air Force received a batch of 10 Alto NGs for training duties. Half of them were paid for by the Czech government while the other half were donated by the Dárek pro Putina charity group.

== Variants ==
Alto NG
Improved "New Generation" version introduced in 2022. This model has a 600 kg (1,323 lb) gross weight, strengthened nosewheel landing gear leg and fuselage, longer engine mount and cowling for the Rotax 912 ULS engine, plus uses push-pull tubes in place of control cables.
Alto 912 TG
Tricycle landing gear version with a 472.5 kg (1,042 lb) gross weight.
Alto TW
Tailwheel (conventional gear) model.
Alto 100
Version for the American light sport aircraft market.

Alto 912 TG on display at the 2019 Australian International Airshow

Direct Fly Alto 100 N161DF

== Specifications (Alto TG European ultralight) ==
Data from Bayerl and Direct Fly

General characteristics

- Crew: one
- Capacity: one passenger
- Length: 6.15 m (20 ft 2 in)
- Wingspan: 8.10 m (26 ft 7 in)
- Height: 2.25 m (7 ft 5 in)
- Wing area: 10.14 m^{2} (109.1 sq ft)
- Empty weight: 287 kg (633 lb)
- Gross weight: 472.5 kg (1,042 lb)
- Fuel capacity: 118 litres (26 imp gal; 31 US gal)
- Powerplant: 1 × Rotax 912ULS four cylinder, liquid and air-cooled, four stroke aircraft engine, 75 kW (101 hp)

Performance

- Maximum speed: 245 km/h (152 mph, 132 kn)
- Cruise speed: 210 km/h (130 mph, 110 kn)
- Stall speed: 65 km/h (40 mph, 35 kn)
- Never exceed speed: 270 km/h (170 mph, 150 kn)
- g limits: +4/-2
- Rate of climb: 5.5 m/s (1,080 ft/min)
- Wing loading: 46.6 kg/m^{2} (9.5 lb/sq ft)

== See also ==
Aircraft of comparable role, configuration, and era

- Piper Sport
