= Douglas 423 =

Douglas Model 423

General information
- Type: Heavy bomber
- Manufacturer: Douglas Aircraft
- Status: Design only
- Primary user: United States Army Air Force
- Number built: 0

The Douglas Model 423 was a bomber aircraft design developed by American aircraft manufacturer Douglas to compete with the Convair B-36 design for a major U.S. Army Air Force contract for an intercontinental bomber in 1941. Although identified as the Douglas XB-31 in some publications, the project documents indicate that it was designed much later than the R40-B competition.

== Development ==
In April 1941, the possibility of Great Britain falling to Nazi Germany seemed very real, and so the United States Army Air Corps unveiled a competition for a long-range bomber with intercontinental range (10,000 miles), making it capable of conducting air-strikes on Nazi-occupied Europe from US bases. Douglas stated that it did not wish to produce an 'out-and-out 10,000-mile (16,090 km) airplane project', instead proposing a bomber derivative of the Model 415 C-74 Globemaster transoceanic heavy-lift military transport as the Model 423 with a range of 6,000 miles (9,654 km). The Douglas Model 423 was eventually rejected in favor of the Consolidated Model 36, which became the Convair B-36 Peacemaker.

== Specifications (Model 423) ==
(Note: The primary source labels this project as the XB-31, which was much smaller, earlier project, competing with the B-29 and B-32)

Data from McDonnell Douglas aircraft since 1920 : Volume I (erroneously labelled as XB-31)

General characteristics

- Crew: 8
- Length: 117 ft 3 in (35.74 m)
- Wingspan: 207 ft (63 m)
- Height: 42 ft 7 in (12.98 m)
- Wing area: 3,300 sq ft (310 m^{2})
- Empty weight: 109,200 lb (49,532 kg)
- Max takeoff weight: 198,000 lb (89,811 kg)
- Powerplant: 4 × Pratt & Whitney R-4360 Wasp Major 28-cylinder air-cooled radial piston engines, 3,000 hp (2,200 kW) each
- Propellers: 3-bladed constant-speed propellers

Performance Armament

- Guns:
  - 6× 0.50 in (13 mm) machine guns in remote ventral and dorsal turrets
  - 2× 37 mm (1.5 in) cannon
- Bombs:
  - 25,000 lb (11,000 kg) of bombs

== See also ==
Aircraft of comparable role, configuration, and era

- Convair B-36 Peacemaker

Related lists

- List of bomber aircraft
- List of military aircraft of the United States
