= Duruble Edelweiss =

Edelweiss

General information
- Type: Utility aircraft
- Manufacturer: Homebuilt
- Designer: Roland T. Duruble
- Number built: at least 10 by 1985

History
- First flight: 7 July 1962

The Duruble Edelweiss is a light utility aircraft designed in France in the early 1960s and marketed for homebuilding. It is a low-wing cantilever monoplane with retractable tricycle undercarriage and all-metal construction. The aircraft was designed for a load factor of 9. Two- and four-seat versions were designed. The aircraft's creator, Roland Duruble flew the first example, a two-seater designated RD-02 in 1962, and in 1970 began to market plans for a stretched version with a rear bench seat as the RD-03. Over the next 15 years, 56 sets of plans had been sold, and at least nine Edelweisses finished and flown. In the 1980s, Duruble marketed an updated version of his original two-seater as the RD-02A, and sold around seven sets of plans, with at least one aircraft flying by 1985.

== Variants ==
RD-02
RD-02A
Variant designed for homebuilt construction
RD-03A
Two-seat variant with a 100 hp (75 kW) Continental O-200 engine.
RD-03B
Variant designed to have either a 135 hp (101 kW) Lycoming O-320 or Franklin Sport 4B engine. Utility variant with two seats or a normal variant with 2+2 seating.
RD-03C
Variant with a 150 hp (112 kW) Lycoming engine and increased fuel capacity. Utility variant with two-seats or a normal variant with 2+2 seating for four adults.

== Specifications (typical RD-03A) ==
Data from Jane's all the world's aircraft, 1975-76

General characteristics

- Crew: 2
- Length: 6.27 m (20 ft 7 in)
- Wingspan: 8.75 m (28 ft 8 in)
- Height: 2.35 m (7 ft 9 in)
- Wing area: 11.04 m^{2} (118.8 sq ft)
- Aspect ratio: 6.95
- Airfoil: NACA 23000 series
- Empty weight: 406.5 kg (896 lb) equipped
- Max takeoff weight: 699 kg (1,541 lb)
- Fuel capacity: 100 L (26 US gal; 22 imp gal)
- Powerplant: 1 × Continental O-200 4-cyl. air-cooled horizontally opposed piston engine, 75 kW (100 hp)
- Propellers: 2-bladed wooden fixed pitch propeller

Performance

- Maximum speed: 257 km/h (160 mph, 139 kn)
- Cruise speed: 234 km/h (145 mph, 126 kn)
- Stall speed: 76.5 km/h (47.5 mph, 41.3 kn) flaps down
- Never exceed speed: 316 km/h (196 mph, 171 kn)
- Range: 1,125 km (699 mi, 607 nmi) max fuel with 30 min reserve
- Service ceiling: 4,570 m (14,990 ft)
- Rate of climb: 3.3 m/s (650 ft/min)
- Wing loading: 63 kg/m^{2} (13 lb/sq ft)

== See also ==
Aircraft of comparable role, configuration, and era

- Piel Emeraude
