= Durand et Delaville RB.01 Beauregard =

1950s French aircraft

RB.01 Beauregard

General information
- Type: Tourism
- National origin: France
- Manufacturer: Durand et Delaville
- Number built: 1

History
- First flight: 1952

The Durand et Delaville RB.01 Beauregard was a tourism aircraft built in France in the early 1950s.

== Design ==
The RB.01 was a single-seat parasol monoplane of amateur construction.

== Specifications ==
Data from

General characteristics

- Crew: One
- Length: 5.25 m (17 ft 3 in)
- Wingspan: 8.26 m (27 ft 1 in)
- Height: 1.85 m (6 ft 1 in)
- Wing area: 9.09 m^{2} (97.8 sq ft)
- Empty weight: 171 kg (377 lb)
- Gross weight: 272 kg (600 lb)
- Powerplant: 2 × Volkswagen 4-cylinder radial engine, 19 kW (25 hp) each
- Propellers: 2-bladed

Performance

- Maximum speed: 107 km/h (66 mph, 58 kn) at ground level
