= Dynamic Sport =

Polish aircraft manufacturer

- Company type: Privately held company
- Industry: Aerospace
- Founded: 1995
- Founder: Wojtek Pierzyński
- Headquarters: Kielce, Poland
- Products: Paragliders, paramotors
- Website: www.dynamicsport.com.pl

Dynamic Sport (sometimes styled DynamicSport) is a Polish aircraft manufacturer based in Kielce. The company was founded in 1995 by the Polish Aero Club and Wojtek Pierzyński. It specializes in the design and manufacture of paramotors and powered parachutes in the form of ready-to-fly aircraft for the US FAR 103 Ultralight Vehicles rules and the European microlight category. At one time it produced a full line of paragliders.

== History ==
The company was originally started by in 1994 as by Pierzyński as "TNT Sport". The Raven paraglider was the first product designed and produced before the company name was changed to Dynamic Sport and relocated to Kielce in 1995.

By 1996 the company had paramotors in series production using the ubiquitous Solo 210 motor.

After originally manufacturing paragliders from local materials that proved inferior, the fabric was switched to Porcher Marine. This resulted in higher prices but better performance and durability.

Rene Coulon, in reviewing the company in 2003, wrote, "very involved in the production of paragliders and paramotors, Dynamic is a soundly based company that knows where it’s going. With the growth of the European Community Poland will have access to an enormous market where their technical and intellectual capacity can be appreciated, especially with their very low prices at the moment."

In a 2011 review of the company by the Polish on-line aviation magazine, Lotniczapolska, the company at that time acted as a distributor for Walkerjet engines and reduction drives. The manufacturer did not supply parts in a timely manner, which resulted in criticism of Dynamic Sport. This was resolved by changing suppliers for the engines and drives.

== Products ==
In the mid-2000s the company produced a full line of paragliders, including the Dynamic Sport Enigma, Gravis, Magnum, Raven and Viper, but by the mid-2010s had ceased production in favour of acting as a dealer for Advance Thun SA paragliders.

Aside from manufacturing paramotors, such as the now out-of-production Climber and Rocket, the company also provides flight training, including tandem flights, ballistic parachutes and services such as reserve parachute re-packing and aerial photography.

Independent testing of company paramotors by Lotniczapolska in field use resulted in praise for the product's durability.

Dynamic Sport became the Polish agent for the Scout Aviation SCOUT paramotor in 2015.

== Aircraft ==
Summary of aircraft built by Dynamic Sport
Model name	First flight	Type
Dynamic Sport Climber	mid-2000s	Paramotor
Dynamic Sport Rocket	mid-2000s	Paramotor
Dynamic Sport Enigma	mid-2000s	Paraglider
Dynamic Sport Gravis	mid-2000s	Paraglider
Dynamic Sport Magnum	mid-2000s	Paraglider
Dynamic Sport Raven	mid-2000s	Paraglider
Dynamic Sport Viper	mid-2000s	Paraglider
