= Discovery Aviation Model 201 =

Model 201
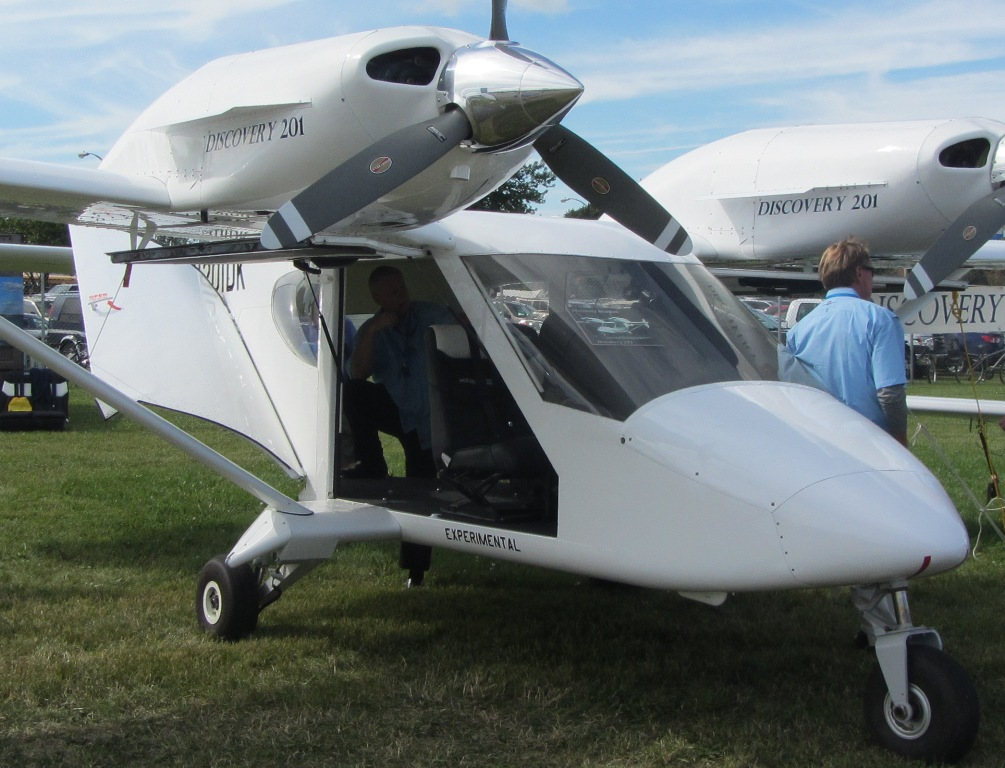

General information
- Type: Utility aircraft
- National origin: Russia
- Manufacturer: Discovery Aviation
- Designer: Yuri Lakhtachev, Evgeny Maslov Yuri Lakhtachev (Designer)

History
- Introduction date: 2013 Sun 'n Fun airshow.
- First flight: 17 July 1997 (Accord 201)
- Developed from: Avia Accord 201

The Discovery Aviation Model 201 aka Avia Accord 201 is a light utility aircraft that was re-introduced in 2013.

== Design and development ==
The Model 201 is a high-wing twin engine fixed tricycle gear aircraft with twin rudders. The aircraft was designed by Avia Ltd of Moscow, Russia as the Avia Accord 201. The aircraft was produced in the Sokol plant at Nizhny Novgorod. The aircraft features rear clamshell doors that can be removed, and has flown with an outrigger floats. The aircraft has been modified with updated avionics to be marketed for western sales by Discovery Aviation.

== Specifications (Model 201) ==
Data from manufacturer.

General characteristics

- Crew: 1
- Capacity: 6
- Length: 8.08 m (26 ft 6 in)
- Wingspan: 13.75 m (45 ft 1 in)
- Height: 3.05 m (10 ft 0 in)
- Empty weight: 1,540 kg (3,395 lb)
- Gross weight: 2,210 kg (4,872 lb)
- Max takeoff weight: 998 kg (2,200 lb)
- Fuel capacity: 696 litres (153 imp gal; 184 US gal) in two tanks of 348 litres (77 imp gal; 92 US gal) each
- Powerplant: 2 × Continental IO-360ES7 horizontally-opposed, six cylinder, 160 kW (210 hp) each
- Propellers: 3-bladed Hartzell PHC-H3YF-2KUF Constant Speed

Performance

- Maximum speed: 265 km/h (165 mph, 143 kn)
- Cruise speed: 209 km/h (130 mph, 113 kn)
- Stall speed: 120 km/h (75 mph, 65 kn)
- Range: 2,500 km (1,600 mi, 1,300 nmi)
- Service ceiling: 6,096 m (20,000 ft)
- Power/mass: 11.5 lb/hp
