= Durand Mk V =

1970s home-build two-seat sports biplane

Mk V
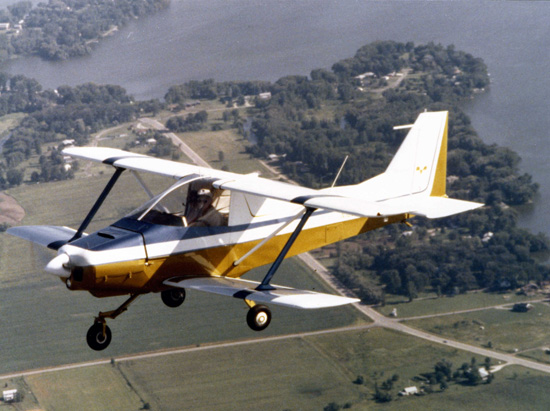

General information
- Type: Sports plane
- Manufacturer: Homebuilt
- Designer: William H. Durand
- Number built: at least 9 by 1998

History
- First flight: 28 June 1978

The Durand Mk V was a two-seat sports biplane aircraft developed in the United States in the 1970s and marketed for home building. The design was distinctive due to a large negative stagger on the wings, but was otherwise conventional. The single-bay wings were braced with I-struts, and while both upper and lower wings were equipped with full-span flaps, lateral control was by spoilers on the lower wing rather than ailerons. Flight testing revealed that the aircraft was impossible to stall. The pilot and single passenger sat side by side beneath an expansive canopy, and the undercarriage was of fixed, tricycle type.

Durand sold 75 sets of plans by 1987, and by that time, at least five aircraft (including the prototype) were known to be flying. By 1998 the company said 91 sets of plans had been sold and nine aircraft flown.

== Specifications (typical) ==
General characteristics

- Crew: One pilot
- Capacity: 1 passenger
- Length: 6.17 m (20 ft 3 in)
- Wingspan: 7.47 m (24 ft 6 in)
- Height: 2.03 m (6 ft 8 in)
- Wing area: 13.3 m^{2} (144 sq ft)
- Empty weight: 549 kg (1,210 lb)
- Gross weight: 834 kg (1,840 lb)
- Powerplant: 1 × Lycoming O-320 , 112 kW (150 hp)

Performance

- Cruise speed: 217 km/h (135 mph, 117 kn)
- Range: 644 km (400 mi, 350 nmi)
- Service ceiling: 4,575 m (15,000 ft)
- Rate of climb: 6.1 m/s (1,200 ft/min)
