= Didier Pti'tAvion =

French ultralight aircraft

Pti'tAvion

General information
- Type: Ultralight aircraft
- National origin: France
- Manufacturer: Didier ULM
- Status: In production

The Didier Pti'tAvion (English: Small Airplane) is a French ultralight aircraft that was designed and produced by Didier ULM of Francheval. The aircraft is supplied as a kit for amateur construction or as a complete ready-to-fly-aircraft.

== Design and development ==
The aircraft was designed to comply with the Fédération Aéronautique Internationale microlight rules. It features a strut-braced high-wing a two-seats-in-side-by-side configuration enclosed cockpit, fixed tricycle landing gear and a single engine in tractor configuration.

The aircraft is made predominantly from welded steel tubing, with its flying surfaces covered in doped aircraft fabric. Its 9.40 m (30.8 ft) span wing, has an area of 15.04 m^{2} (161.9 sq ft) and it constructed using a welded steel tube lattice spar, aluminium tube ribs and a laminate leading edge. The standard engine is the 80 hp (60 kW) Rotax 912UL four-stroke powerplant. The cockpit is 1.15 m (45.3 in) wide and is intended to accommodate "bulky crew".

The aircraft comes with its own open-frame trailer for ground transport.

== Specifications (Pti'tAvion) ==
Data from Bayerl

General characteristics

- Crew: one
- Capacity: one passenger
- Wingspan: 9.40 m (30 ft 10 in)
- Wing area: 15.04 m^{2} (161.9 sq ft)
- Empty weight: 275 kg (606 lb)
- Gross weight: 450 kg (992 lb)
- Fuel capacity: 53 litres (12 imp gal; 14 US gal)
- Powerplant: 1 × Rotax 912UL four cylinder, liquid and air-cooled, four stroke aircraft engine, 60 kW (80 hp)
- Propellers: 3-bladed composite

Performance

- Maximum speed: 175 km/h (109 mph, 94 kn)
- Cruise speed: 150 km/h (93 mph, 81 kn)
- Stall speed: 65 km/h (40 mph, 35 kn)
- Rate of climb: 5 m/s (980 ft/min)
