= Douglas DF =

1936 airliner flying boat series by Douglas

DF-151
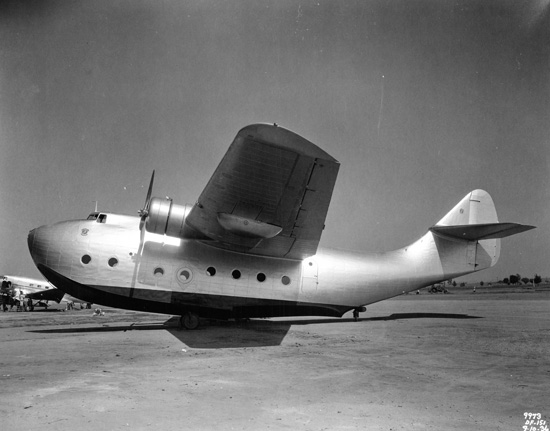

General information
- Type: commercial passenger flying-boat
- National origin: United States
- Manufacturer: Douglas Aircraft Company
- Number built: 4 (1 prototype, 3 production)

History
- Introduction date: 1930s
- First flight: 1936

The Douglas DF was a commercial flying boat built by Douglas Aircraft Company, first flown on 24 September 1936.

== Design and development ==
The DF could accommodate 32 passengers, or 16 in sleeper cabins, and was the last flying boat built by the company.

Despite acceptable handling and performance within design specifications, no commercial orders were forthcoming and faced with no domestic market for aircraft already built, the company obtained export permits for them. The first two production aircraft were sold to Japan, ostensibly for commercial airline use. The second aircraft was lost on a survey flight in 1938. The second production pair were sold (as DF-195's) to the Soviet Union and after winterizing, were disassembled and transported to Russia via ship, where they were operated as transports by Aeroflot.

== Variants ==
DF-151
Specification/designation of the first two aircraft sold to Japan.
DF-195
Specification/designation of the second two aircraft sold to the Soviet Union.

== Specifications ==
Data from Jane's all the World's Aircraft 1937, McDonnell Douglas aircraft since 1920 : Volume I, Biplanes, Triplanes, and Seaplanes, NICO BRAAS COLLECTION, No. 9317. Douglas DF-151

General characteristics

- Crew: 3 flight crew + cabin crew
- Capacity: up to 32 passengers in four 8-seat compartments
- Length: 69 ft 10.5625 in (21.299488 m)
- Wingspan: 95 ft (29 m)
- Hull beam: 10 ft 3 in (3.12 m) maximum
- Hull depth: 13 ft (4.0 m) maximum
- Height: 24 ft 6.25 in (7.4740 m)
- Wing area: 1,295 sq ft (120.3 m^{2})
- Mean aerodynamic chord: 14 ft 7 in (4.45 m)
- Empty weight: 16,500 lb (7,484 kg)
- Gross weight: 28,500 lb (12,927 kg)
- Powerplant: 2 × Wright SGR-1820G-2 Cyclone 9-cylinder air-cooled radial piston engines, 1,000 hp (750 kW) each
- Propellers: 3->-bladed constant-speed propellers

Performance

- Maximum speed: 167 mph (269 km/h, 145 kn) at sea level

178 mph (155 kn; 286 km/h) at 5,000 ft (1,500 m)

- Cruise speed: 150 mph (240 km/h, 130 kn) at 75% power at sea level

156 mph (136 kn; 251 km/h) at 75% power at 5,000 ft (1,500 m)
164 mph (143 kn; 264 km/h) at 75% power at 9,600 ft (2,900 m)

- Alighting speed: 66 mph (57 kn; 106 km/h)
- Range: 1,500 mi (2,400 km, 1,300 nmi) with 32 passengers

3,300 mi (2,900 nmi; 5,300 km) with 12 passengers

- Service ceiling: 14,300 ft (4,400 m)
- Absolute ceiling: 16,400 ft (5,000 m)
- Rate of climb: 550 ft/min (2.8 m/s) at sea level

585 ft/min (2.97 m/s) at 5,000 ft (1,500 m)

- Wing loading: 22 lb/sq ft (110 kg/m^{2})
- Power/mass: 0.07 hp/lb (0.12 kW/kg)
