= Doak VZ-4 =

1958 experimental VTOL aircraft model

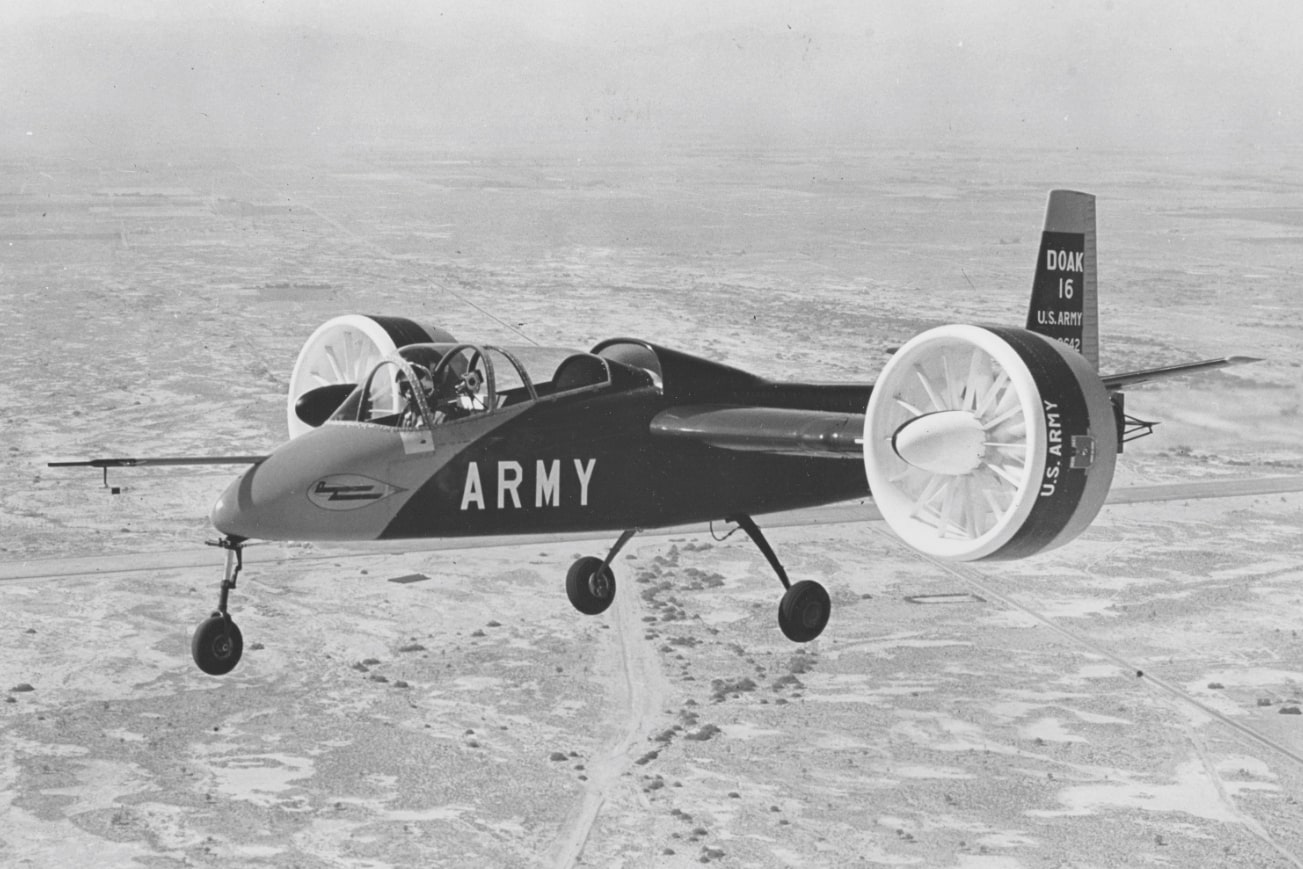

General information
- Type: VTOL research convertiplane
- Manufacturer: Doak Aircraft Company
- Status: preserved at Fort Eustis VA
- Primary user: United States Army
- Number built: 1

History
- First flight: 25 February 1958

The Doak VZ-4 (or Doak Model 16) was an American prototype Vertical Takeoff and Landing (VTOL) aircraft built in the 1950s for service in the United States Army. Only a single prototype was built, and the U.S. Army withdrew it from active trials in 1963.

== Development ==
Edmund R. Doak, Jr., a self-taught engineer and vice president of Douglas Aircraft Company, founded Doak Aircraft Company in Torrance, California, in 1940. The company grew to 4,000 employees during World War II, with subcontracts from every major American aircraft manufacturer. These included molded plywood fuselages for trainers such as the AT-6 and Vultee BT-13, and doors, hatches and gun turrets for a multitude of aircraft.

Doak proposed a VTOL aircraft to the U.S. Army's Army Transportation and Research and Engineering Command at Fort Eustis in Newport News, Virginia, in 1950. He touted the aircraft as able to take off and land in a small area, hover and loiter over a target area, and fly backwards like a helicopter without the noise and vibration of a helicopter, while also having the horizontal cruising ability, high speed, wing-mounted weapons, and mission flexibility of a conventional fixed-wing fighter aircraft. Knowing that a Soviet attack on airbases would interdict takeoffs and landings by conventional aircraft, the Army found Doak's proposal attractive, and on 10 April 1956, it awarded Doak a contract to produce a single prototype for use as a research aircraft.

The aircraft, designated the Doak Model 16 by the Doak company and assigned the serial number 56-9642, was originally powered by an 840 shp (630 kW) Lycoming YT53 turboprop engine mounted in the fuselage, later replaced by a 1,000 shp (750 kW) Lycoming T53-L-1 turbine. The engine drove two wingtip-mounted fiberglass tilting ducted fan propellers through a "T" box on the engine that transmitted power to the propellers via a 4-inch (102-mm) aluminum tubular shaft and two smaller shafts. Each propeller was 48-inch (1.22-meter) in diameter and the duct outer diameter was 60-inches (1.52-meter)). The fans were positioned vertically for takeoff and landing – with a rotation speed of 4,800 rpm required for liftoff – and rotated to a horizontal orientation for horizontal flight, the first time this VTOL propulsion concept was tested successfully. The aircraft had metal wings and a metal tail. To save weight, the aircraft originally was constructed of uncovered welded steel tubing, but after it was found that the open frame interfered with forward-speed tests, molded fiberglass was installed over its nose section and thin aluminum sheeting over its aft fuselage. It accommodated a two-person crew, with a pilot and observer seated in tandem in the cockpit. The pilot used a standard stick and rudder to control the aircraft. Its landing gear were taken from a Cessna 182 Skylane, its seats from a North American P-51 Mustang, and its duct actuators from a Lockheed T-33 Shooting Star.

Flight testing began at Torrance Municipal Airport, and Doak completed several tests by 1958. The Model 16 hovered for the first time on 25 February 1958, and the first transition from vertical to horizontal flight (and back again) took place on 5 May 1958. Although the prototype generally was successful, its short takeoff and landing performance was less than hoped for and it displayed a tendency to nose up while making the transition from vertical to horizontal flight.

Doak's engineers believed that they could solve the prototype's problems, and after taxiing testing, 32 hours of flight testing in a test stand, and 18 hours of tethered hovering, the aircraft was transferred to Edwards Air Force Base, California, in October 1958. It underwent another 50 hours of testing, in which it proved capable with the turbine engine of achieving a maximum speed of 230 mph (370 km/h), a cruise speed of 175 mph (282 km/h), a range of 250 miles (400 km), an endurance of one hour, and a service ceiling of 12,000 feet (3,700 meters).

== Operational history ==
The U.S. Army accepted the prototype in September 1959, designated it the Doak VZ-4DA, and passed it to the NASA Langley Research Center in Hampton, Virginia, for further testing. When Doak laid off 90 percent of his employees late in 1960 due to a recession in the aircraft industry, Douglas Aircraft took over the project, purchased its patent rights and engineering files, and hired four engineers from Doak to continue work on the VZ-4DA.

Work continued on the VZ-4DA until 1963, when the U.S. Army decided that the helicopter would meet its VTOL requirements, shifted funding away from the design and testing of unconventional VTOL aircraft to the design and procurement of helicopters, and discontinued trials of the VZ-4DA. The National Aeronautics and Space Administration (NASA), later acquired the aircraft and continued testing flights through 1972.

== Preservation ==
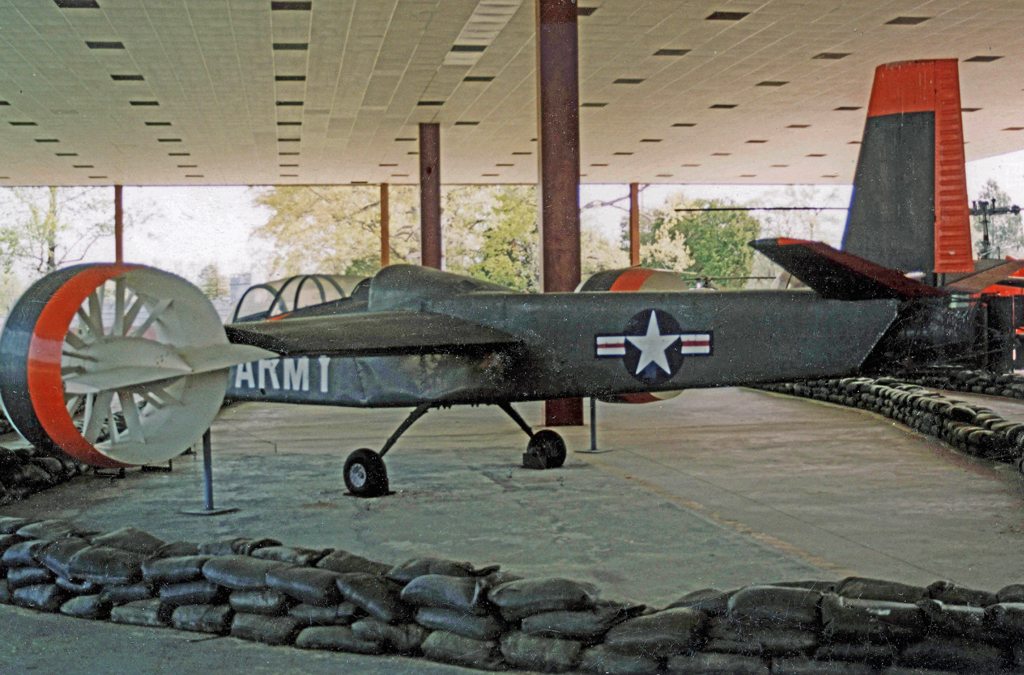
The prototype Doak VZ-4 exhibited by the U.S. Army at Fort Eustis, Virginia, in 2004.

In January 1973, the VZ-4DA was donated to the U.S. Army Transportation Museum at Fort Eustis, Virginia, where it was placed on public display with other aircraft in the museum's outdoor Aviation Pavilion. In August 2024, the VZ-4DA was permanently transferred to the U.S. Army Aviation Museum where it is on exhibit inside the galleries. Other Doak artifacts are preserved at the Western Museum of Flight in Torrance, California.

== Operators ==
USA

- National Aeronautics and Space Administration (NASA)
- United States Army

== Specifications ==
Data from The Illustrated Encyclopedia of Aircraft

General characteristics

- Crew: 2
- Length: 32 ft 0 in (9.75 m)
- Wingspan: 16 ft 0 in (4.88 m) excluding ducted fans

25 ft 6 in (8 m) including ducted fans

- Height: 10 ft 0 in (3.05 m)
- Wing area: 8.92 sq ft (0.829 m^{2}) excluding ducted fans
- Airfoil: NACA 2418
- Empty weight: 2,300 lb (1,043 kg)
- Gross weight: 3,200 lb (1,451 kg)
- Powerplant: 1 × Avco Lycoming YT53 turboshaft engine, 840 shp (630 kW)

Performance

- Maximum speed: 230 mph (370 km/h, 200 kn)
- Range: 230 mi (370 km, 200 nmi)
- Service ceiling: 6,000 ft (1,800 m)

== See also ==
Related lists

- List of military aircraft of the United States
