= Dietz C-4 =

General information
- Type: Biplane
- National origin: United States
- Manufacturer: Dietz Laboratories
- Designer: Conrad Dietz
- Number built: 1

History
- Introduction date: 1928

The Dietz C-4 was a biplane designed by Conrad Dietz.

== Design and development ==
The C-4 (Conrad Design number 4) was a biplane design built by Dietz Laboratories. Conrad Dietz became manager of the newly formed Aeronca, using their services to modify the design for a Dayton Bear engine. The concept was proposed to Aeronca in 1929 to be the first plane manufactured by the company, but it was passed over in favor of the Roche-designed low-cost Aeronca C-2, which launched Aeronca. Dietz died in an accident in September 1931 while demonstrating an Aeronca.

The C-4 was a conventional landing gear-equipped biplane with cantilever wings.

== Specifications (Dietz C-4) ==
Data from Cincinnati Aviation Heritage Society & Museum

General characteristics

- Crew: one
- Capacity: two passengers
- Powerplant: 1 × Dayton Bear radial engine, 110 hp (82 kW)
