= Ducrot SLD =

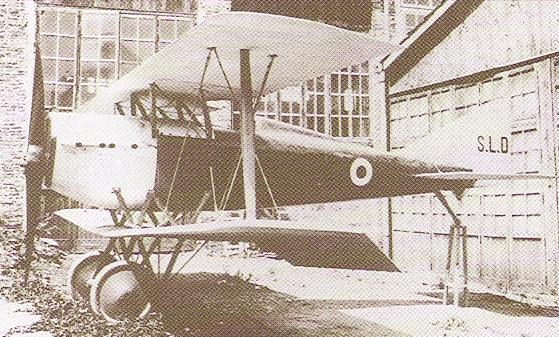

General information
- Type: Fighter
- National origin: Italy
- Manufacturer: Ducrot
- Designer: Ing Manlio Stiavelli and Guido Luzzatti
- Number built: 1

History
- First flight: 1918

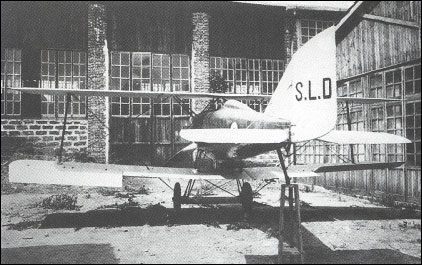

The Ducrot SLD was an Italian fighter prototype built by Ducrot in 1918.

== Design and development ==
During the latter half of World War I, Ing Manlio Stiavelli and Guido Luzzatti of the firm of Vittorio Ducrot at Palermo designed a high-performance fighter in an attempt to allow the company to progress from license production of flying boats designed elsewhere to producer of originally designed aircraft. Emphasizing aerodynamic cleanliness, they designed the SLD (for "Stiavelli-Luzzatti-Ducrot"), a single-seat biplane fighter powered by the 149-kilowatt (200-horsepower) Hispano-Suiza 35 engine driving a two-bladed propeller. It had a plywood monocoque fuselage of oval section. The undercarriage struts extended through the lower wing to carry the fuselage above the lower wing.

== Operational history ==
Testing of the SLD began in October 1918, but its results have been lost. No production order from the Corpo Aeronautico Militare (Italian Royal Air Force) ensued, and only one prototype was built.

== Operators ==
Kingdom of Italy

- Corpo Aeronautico Militare

== Specifications ==
Data from The Complete Book of Fighters

General characteristics

- Wing area: 22 m^{2} (240 sq ft)
- Empty weight: 610 kg (1,345 lb)
- Gross weight: 810 kg (1,786 lb)
- Powerplant: 1 × Hispano-Suiza 8B V-8 water-cooled piston engine, 150 kW (200 hp)

Performance

- Maximum speed: 300 km/h (190 mph, 160 kn)
- Rate of climb: 8.333 m/s (1,640.4 ft/min)
- Time to altitude: 5,000 m (16,404 ft) in 10 minutes
