= La Chapelle-en-Vexin =

- Commune
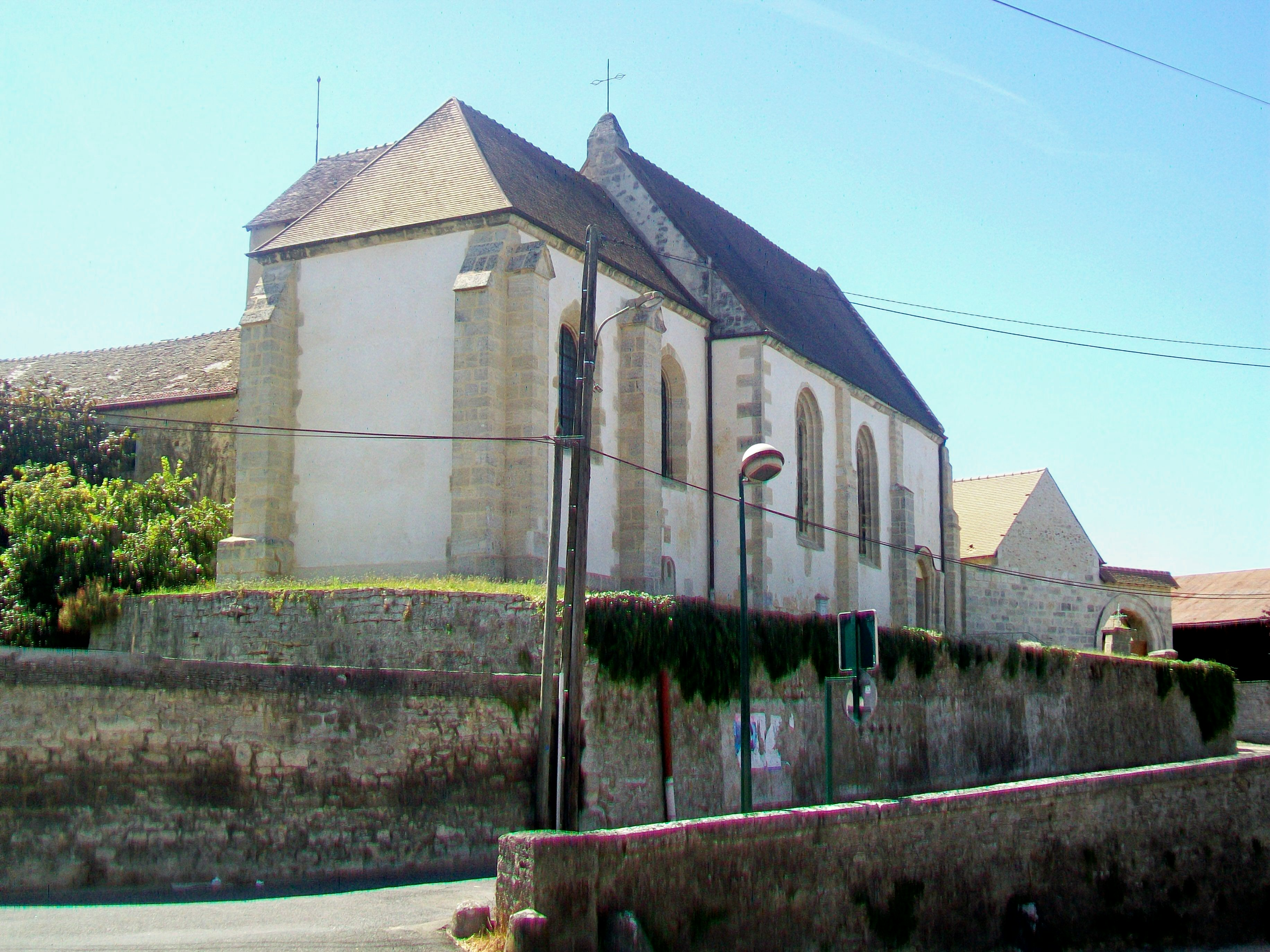
- The church of Saint-Nicolas, in Chapelle-en-Vexin
- Location of La Chapelle-en-Vexin
- Location within France Location within Île-de-France (region)
- Coordinates: 49°11′05″N 1°43′58″E
- Country: France
- Region: Île-de-France
- Department: Val-d'Oise
- Arrondissement: Pontoise
- Canton: Vauréal

Government
  - Mayor (2020–2026): Joëlle Valenchon
- Area^{1}: 3.61 km^{2} (1.39 sq mi)
- Highest elevation: 158 m (518 ft)
- Lowest elevation: 85 m (279 ft)
- Population (2023): 320
  - Density: 89/km^{2} (230/sq mi)
- Time zone: UTC+01:00 (CET)
  - Summer (DST): UTC+02:00 (CEST)
- INSEE/Postal code: 95139 /95420
- ^{1} French Land Register data, which excludes lakes, ponds, glaciers > 1 km^{2} (0.386 sq mi or 247 acres) and river estuaries.

La Chapelle-en-Vexin is a commune in the Val-d'Oise department in Île-de-France in northern France.

== See also ==
- Communes of the Val-d'Oise department
