= Drachen Studio Kecur =

German aircraft manufacturer

- Company type: Privately held company
- Industry: Aerospace
- Products: Ultralight trikes
- Website: www.drachenstudio-kecur.com

Drachen Studio Kecur (English: Dragon Studio Kecur) is a German aircraft manufacturer based in Mettmann, North Rhine-Westphalia. The company specializes in the design and manufacture of ultralight trikes and wings for them.

== Background ==
The company is known for its Drachen Studio Kecur Royal 912 trike design that is produced in Slovenia under sub-contract and for its in-house wing design, the EOS 15, that uses spoiler control for roll.

== Aircraft ==
Summary of aircraft built by Drachen Studio Kecur
Model name	First flight	Number built	Type
Drachen Studio Kecur Royal 912			ultralight trike
Drachen Studio Kecur EOS 15			ultralight trike double surface wing
