= John Richard Harding =

American pilot and USAAS officer

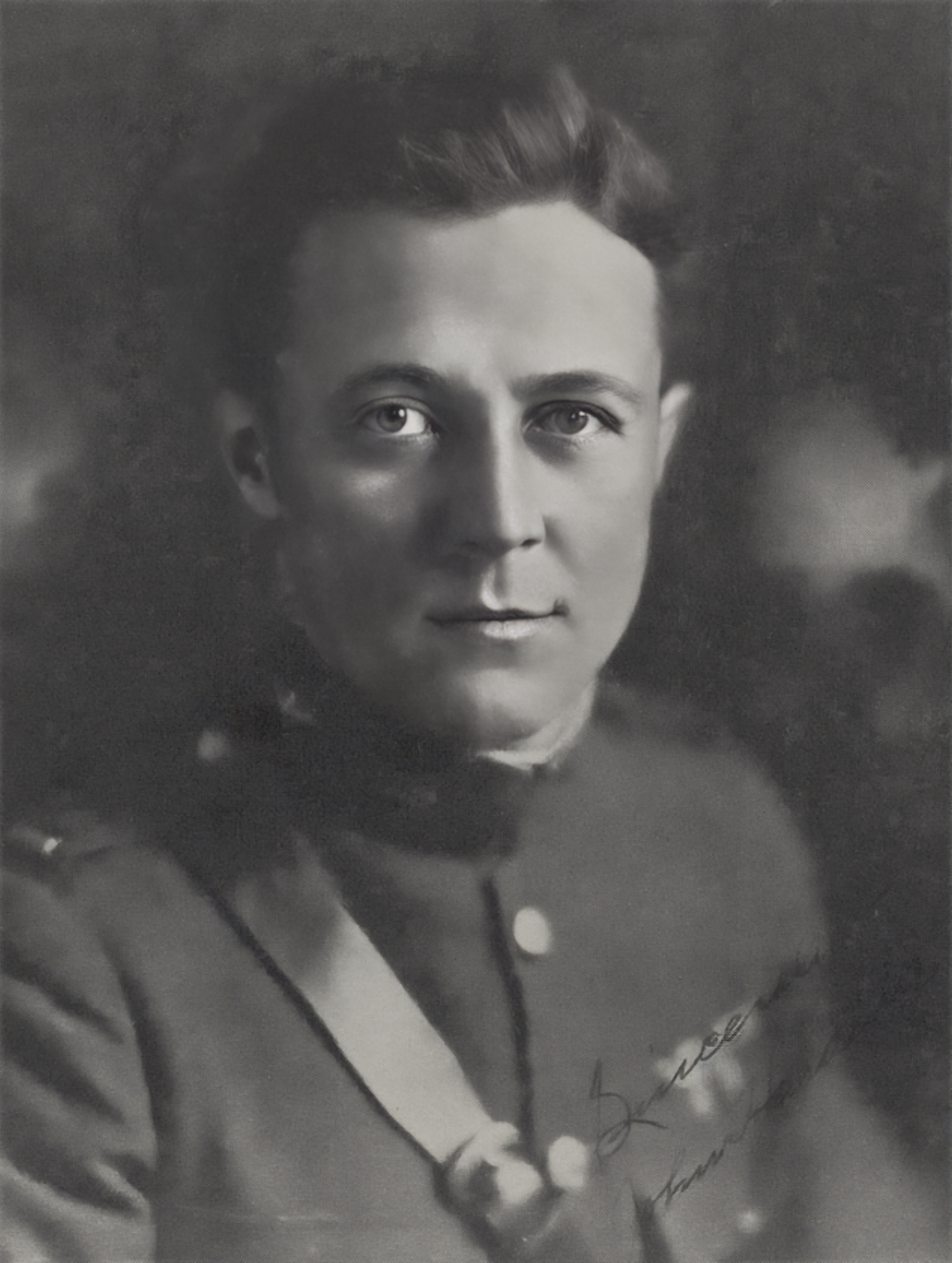
First World Flight Pilot Lt. John Harding, Jr.

John Harding, Jr, was born in Nashville, Tennessee June 2, 1896. His parents were John Richard Harding, III and Roberta Chase Harding.

Harding attended the Webb Preparatory School, in Bell Buckle, Tennessee and Vanderbilt School of Engineering in Nashville. His education was disrupted from college when he volunteered for the Army Air Service in World War I. He rose from private to Sargent when he trained as an Air Service Master Signal Electrician and Airplane Mechanician working at the Dayton, Ohio air facility. A pilot discovered his abilities, and recruited him as a back-seat mechanic, which eventually led to his commission as a Lieutenant.

Lt. John Harding was one of four Army Air Service officers that completed the first aerial circumnavigation world flight in 1924. Lt. Harding was the co-pilot of the Douglas World Cruiser: New Orleans. He and the other aviators were all awarded the Distinguished Service Medal, the French Legion of Honor and the Japanese Order of the Sacred Treasure for the first circumnavigation of the earth by air.

Lt. Harding and The First World Flight author Lowell Thomas, subsequently proceeded on a lecture tour about the world flight. The lecture series lasted two years.

John Harding went on to work as a service manager for Boeing Aircraft Company, for Pump Engineering Service Corporation, and founded Harding Devices Company in Dallas, Texas which manufactured aircraft components.

John Harding, Jr. died at the age of 71 in La Jolla, California.
