= First aerial circumnavigation =

1924 aviation feat by American officers

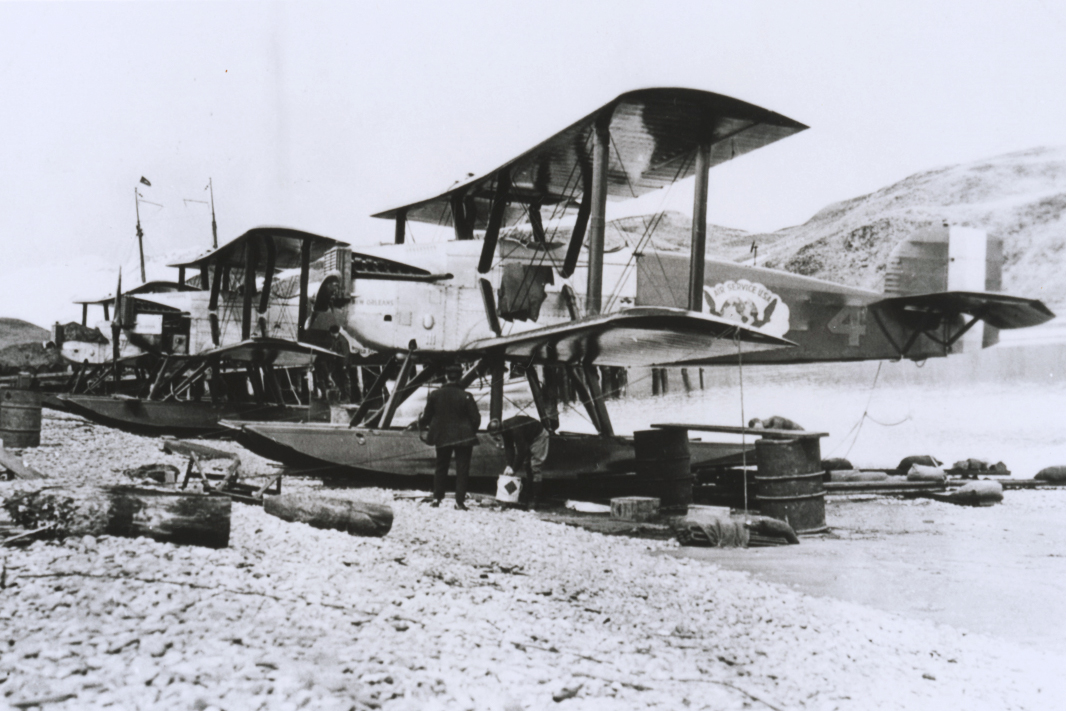
Photograph of three Douglas World Cruiser aircraft on a beach, Alaska, 1924. New Orleans is in the foreground.

The first aerial circumnavigation of the world was completed in 1924 by four aviators from an eight-man team of the United States Army Air Service, the precursor of the United States Air Force. The 175-day journey from April to September covered over 26,345 miles (42,398 km). The team generally traveled east to west, around the northern Pacific Rim, through to South Asia and Europe and back to Seattle's Sand Point Airfield in the United States. Airmen Lowell H. Smith, Leslie P. Arnold, Erik H. Nelson, and John Harding Jr. made the trip in two single-engined open-cockpit Douglas World Cruisers (DWC) configured as floatplanes for most of the journey. Lead aircraft Chicago, and the New Orleans completed the expedition. Four more flyers in two additional DWC began the journey but their aircraft crashed or were forced down. All airmen survived. They were awarded the Distinguished Service Medal, and the flight won the Mackay Trophy aviation award for 1924.

== U.S. preparation for circumnavigation attempt ==
In the early 1920s several countries were vying to be the first to fly around the world. The British had made one unsuccessful around-the-world air flight attempt in 1922. The following year, a French team had tried; the Italians, Portuguese, and British also announced plans for world-circling flights. In early 1923, the US Army Air Service became interested in having a squadron of military aircraft undertake a round-the-world flight. It assigned a group of officers in the War Department planning group, formed as the World Flight Committee, the job of finding a suitable aircraft and planning the mission. This high-level Army enterprise, under the command of Major General Mason M. Patrick, Chief of the Air Service, would have the support of the Navy, Diplomatic Corps, Bureau of Fisheries and Coast Guard Services.

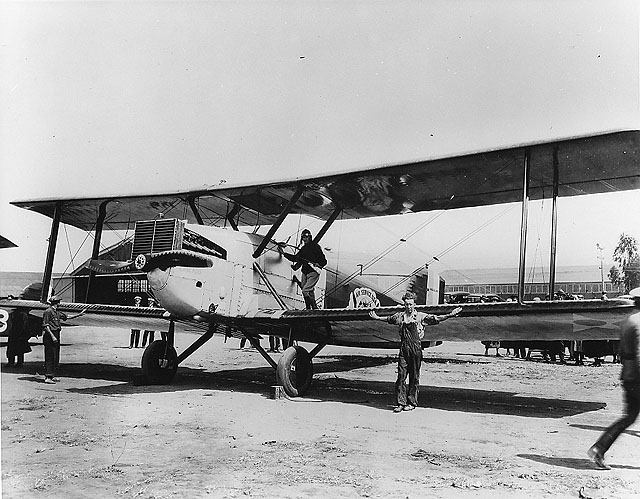
The aircraft shown here, Chicago, led the first round the world flight in 1924.

The War Department instructed the Air Service to look at both the Fokker T-2 transport and the Davis-Douglas Cloudster to see if either would be suitable and to acquire examples for testing. (Note: During 1922–1923, the Fokker T-2 was used by the U.S. Army to set a series of long distance and endurance records.) Although deemed satisfactory, the planning group considered other US Air Service military aircraft both in service and production, with a view that a dedicated design that could be fitted with interchangeable landing gear, wheeled and pontoons for water landings, would be preferable.

When the head of Davis-Douglas, Donald Douglas, was asked for information on the Davis-Douglas Cloudster, he instead submitted data on a modified DT-2, a torpedo bomber that Douglas had built for the US Navy in 1921 and 1922. The DT-2 had proven to be a sturdy aircraft that could accommodate interchangeable wheeled and pontoon landing gear. Since the aircraft was an existing model, Douglas stated that a new aircraft, which he named the Douglas World Cruiser (DWC), could be delivered within 45 days after a contract was awarded. The Air Service agreed and sent Lieutenant Erik Henning Nelson (1888–1970), a member of the planning group, to California to work out the details with Douglas. (Note: Lt. Nelson was eventually assigned to the World Flight as the pilot of DWC #4.)

Douglas, assisted by Jack Northrop, began to modify a DT-2 to suit the circumnavigation requirements. The main modification involved its fuel capacity. All the internal bomb carrying structures were removed with additional fuel tanks added to the wings and fuselage fuel tanks enlarged in the aircraft. The total fuel capacity went from 115 to 644 U.S. gallons (440 to 2,440 liters).

Nelson took the Douglas proposal to Washington where General Patrick approved it on 1 August 1923. The War Department awarded an initial contract to Douglas for the construction of a single prototype. The prototype met all expectations, and a contract was awarded for four more production aircraft and spare parts. The last DWC was delivered on 11 March 1924. The spare parts included 15 extra Liberty engines, 14 extra sets of pontoons, and enough replacement airframe parts for two more aircraft. These spare parts were sent ahead to locations along the route around the world the aircraft planned to follow.

The aircraft were equipped with no radios nor avionics of any sort, leaving their crew to rely entirely on dead reckoning to navigate.

== Douglas World Cruiser aircraft and crew ==
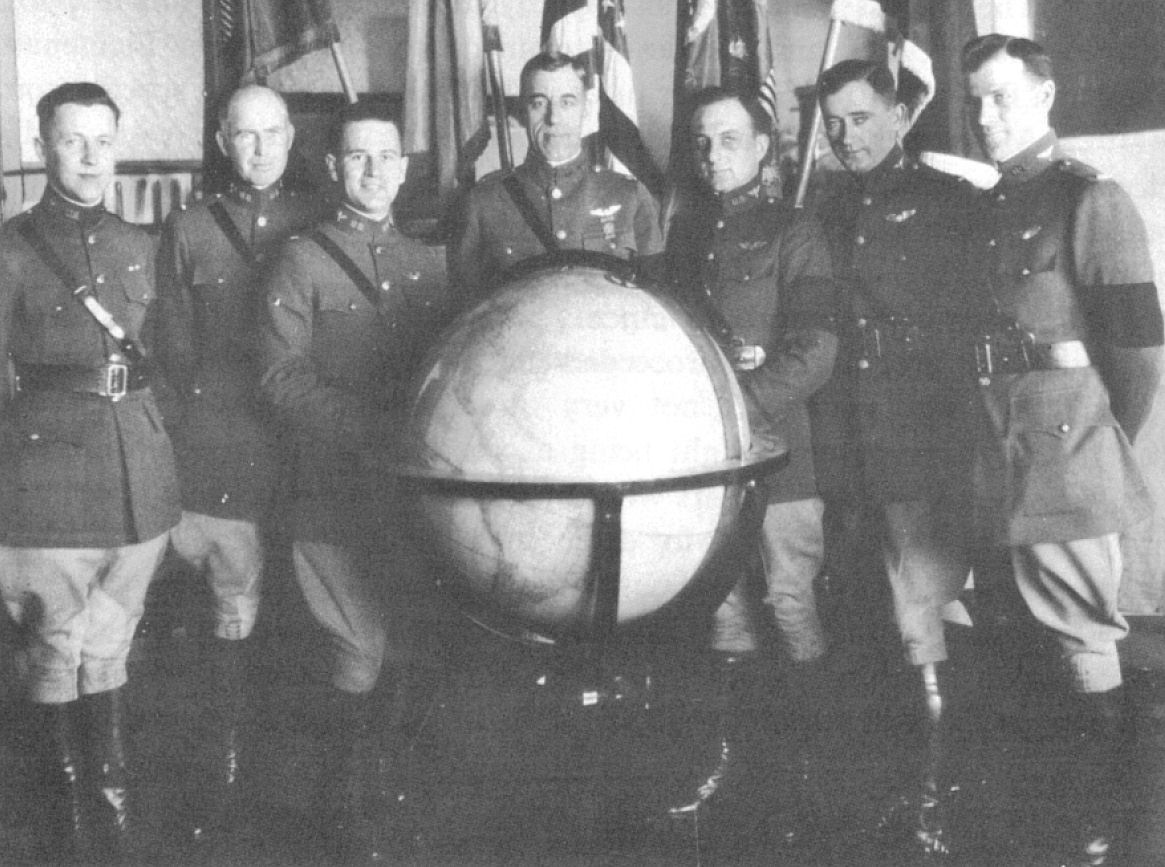
Pilots of the 1924 Round The World Flight

- Seattle (No. 1): Maj. Frederick L. Martin (1882–1956), pilot and flight commander, and SSgt. Alva L. Harvey (1900–1992), flight mechanic (failed to circumnavigate)
- Chicago (No. 2): Lt. Lowell H. Smith (1892–1945), pilot, subsequent flight commander, and 1st Lt. Leslie P. Arnold (1893–1961), co-pilot
- Boston (No. 3)/Boston II (prototype): 1st Lt. Leigh P. Wade (1897–1991), pilot, and SSgt. Henry H. Ogden (1900–1986), flight mechanic (failed to circumnavigate)
- New Orleans (No. 4): Lt. Erik H. Nelson (1888–1970), pilot, and Lt. John Harding Jr. (1896–1968), co-pilot

The pilots trained in meteorology and navigation at Langley Field in Virginia, where they also practiced in the prototype. From February to March 1924, the crews practiced on the production aircraft at the Douglas facility in Santa Monica and in San Diego.

== Team circumnavigation ==
Four aircraft, Seattle, Chicago, Boston, and New Orleans, left Clover Field, Santa Monica, California, on 17 March 1924, for Sand Point in Seattle, Washington, the official start of the journey. The individual aircraft were christened with waters from their namesake cities, prior to departure from Seattle where Boeing Company technicians configured the aircraft for the long over-water portion of the flight, by exchanging wheels for pontoon floats.

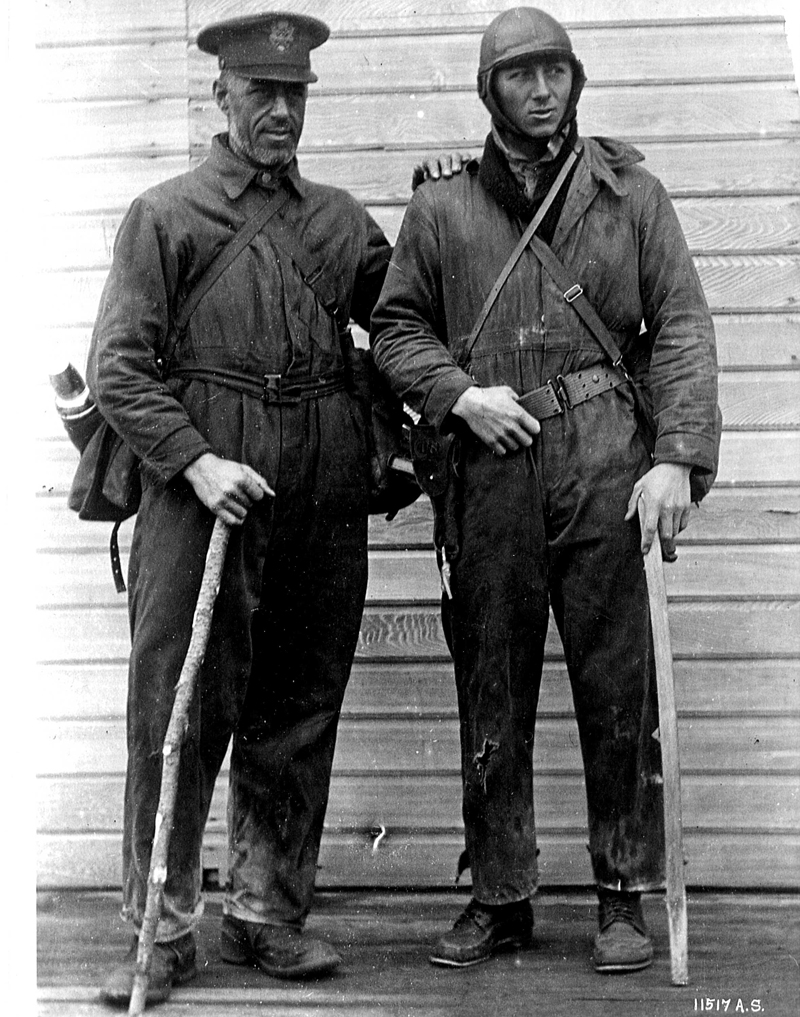
Major Martin and Sergeant Harvey at Port Moller after crash of the Seattle

On 6 April 1924, just 13 days after the British, under Stuart-MacLaren, set off from England in the opposite direction, they left Seattle for Alaska. Shortly after departing Prince Rupert Island on 15 April, the lead aircraft Seattle, flown by Martin with Harvey (the only fully qualified mechanic in the flight), blew a 3-inch (8 cm) hole in its crankcase and was forced to land on Portage Bay. A replacement engine having been provided, Seattle's crew resumed their journey on 25 April, in an attempt to catch up with the other three aircraft awaiting in Dutch Harbor but which ended in failure on 30 April when Seattle crashed in dense fog into a mountainside near Port Moller on the Alaska Peninsula. It was destroyed in the crash. The crew survived six days in the elements before finding shelter in an unoccupied cabin on Moller Bay, making it to a cannery four days later.

The three remaining aircraft continued, with Chicago, flown by Smith and Arnold, assuming the lead. (Note: One of the Army's best aviators, Smith was named to pilot the Chicago and was permitted to choose his own co-pilot, Arnold, who would double as a flight mechanic.) Tracing the Aleutian Islands, the flight traveled across the North Pacific, landing in the Soviet Union notwithstanding the lack of entry permission. The Aleuts of Atka applied the term "thunder-bird" from their mythology to the aircraft.

On 25 May, whilst in Tokyo, the team received a cable reporting "MacLaren crashed at Akyab [Burma]. Plane completely wrecked. Continuance of flight doubtful." They responded by arranging delivery of a spare plane from Tokyo to Akyab (Sittwe) on the USS Paul Jones (DD-230), transshipped in Hong Kong onto the USS William B. Preston, enabling the British to continue in their attempt to be first, as the Portuguese and Argentinians also pressed on.

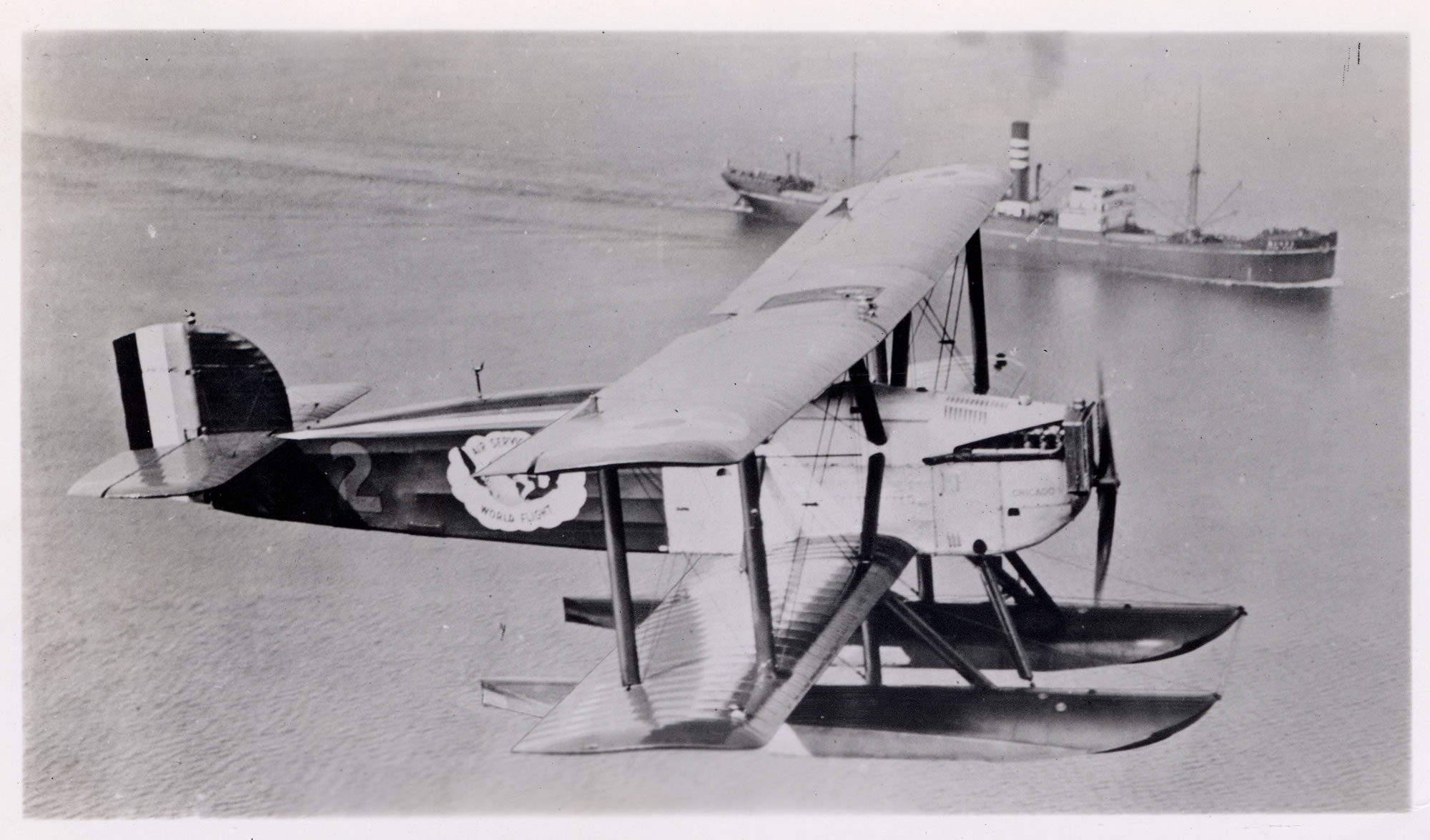
Chicago flying with the floats configuration. At one point in crossing the Atlantic, Chicago had to locate a navy ship and drop it a written note to rescue the crew of the Boston. There were no radios nor avionics.

The aircraft continued via Korea and down the coast of China to French Indochina (now Vietnam). After leaving Haiphong in the Gulf of Tonkin, the Chicago's engine broke a connecting rod and it was forced to land in a lagoon near Huế. The aircraft was considered a novelty in this region and missionary priests supplied the pilots with food and wine while locals climbed aboard its pontoons. The other flyers, who had continued on to Tourane (Da Nang), searched for Chicago by boat and found the crew sitting on the wing in the early morning hours. Three paddle-powered sampans with local crews towed the aircraft for 10 hours, and 25 miles (40 km), to Huế, where the engine was replaced with a spare shipped from Saigon (Ho Chi Minh City): "[T]he fastest – and undoubtedly the first – engine change that had ever been made in Indochina."

The flight continued through Thailand and on to Burma where they came within earshot of MacLaren during a torrential downpour east of Akyab, MacLaren having just resumed his attempt in the aircraft delivered by the Americans and sheltering on the surface at the time. Visual contact was not made and the Americans were unaware of their proximity to MacLaren.

After carrying out the major operation of exchanging the Cruisers' floats for wheeled undercarriage at Calcutta, on the evening of 29 June Smith, in the dark after dinner, slipped and broke a rib. He nevertheless insisted on continuing without delaying the mission. All three aircraft were fitted with new engines in Karachi, New Orleans having suffered a catastrophic engine failure just short of the city and limped in on intermittent power.

They then proceeded into the Middle East and then Europe. The flight arrived in Paris on Bastille Day, 14 July. From Paris the aircraft flew to London and on to the north of England in order to prepare for the Atlantic Ocean crossing by re-installing pontoons and changing engines.

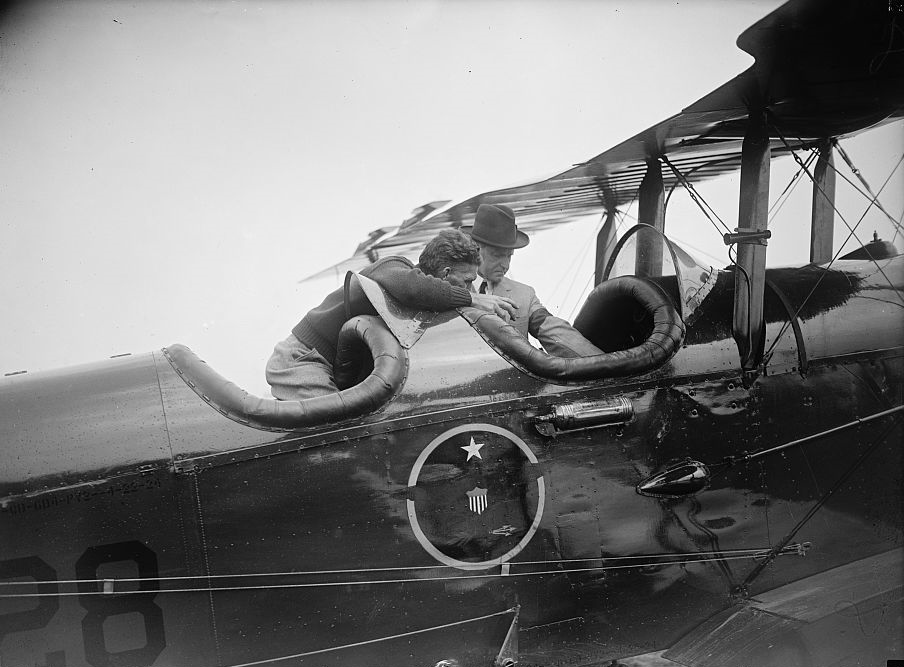
U.S. President Calvin Coolidge inspected the planes when they landed in Washington, D.C., toward the end of the tour in September 1924

On 3 August 1924, en route from Orkney to Iceland, an oil pump failure forced Boston down onto the sea less than halfway to the Faroes. The accompanying Chicago flew on to the Faroes where it dropped a note onto the supporting U.S. Navy light cruiser USS Richmond about the troubled aircraft. The crew having been rescued unhurt, Boston, then on tow, capsized and sank shortly before reaching the Faroes. Chicago and New Orleans had flown on to Hornafjörður, Iceland, the most northerly point of the circumnavigation (65 deg N).

After a long stay in Reykjavík, Iceland, where they met Italian Antonio Locatelli and his crew, also in the course of a circumnavigation attempt, and there accompanied by five navy vessels and their 2,500 seaman, Chicago, with Smith and Arnold still in the lead, and the New Orleans, with Nelson and Harding, continued for Fredricksdal, Greenland. This was to be the longest leg of the entire journey, with those five vessels strung along the route. New engines were installed on arrival at the second stop in Greenland, Ivigtut.

On 31 August, they reached Labrador, Canada, a fuel-pump failure in Chicago having been overcome by four hours of hand pumping by Arnold. After the original prototype, now named Boston II, arrived in Pictou, Nova Scotia, the original Boston crew of Wade and Ogden were able to join the other two aircraft to fly on to Boston (where pontoon floats were exchanged for wheels again) and Washington DC. After a hero's welcome in the capital, the three Douglas World Cruisers flew to the West Coast, on a celebratory multi-city tour, stopping, on 22 September, at Rockwell Field, San Diego, for new engines and then arrived in Santa Monica to a welcoming crowd of at least 100,000 people. Their final landing in Seattle was on 28 September 1924.

The trip had taken 363 flying hours 7 minutes, over 175 calendar days, and covered 26,345 miles (42,398 km), succeeding where the British, Portuguese, French, Italians and Argentinians failed. The Douglas Aircraft Company adopted the motto, "First Around the World – First the World Around". (Note: In addition, the Douglas Aircraft Company introduced the logo features three plane circling a globe, which eventually evolved into an aircraft, a missile, and a globe, and was adopted by the McDonnell Douglas Corporation following the merger of Douglas and the McDonnell Aircraft Corporation in 1967, and then became the basis of the logo of the Boeing Company following its acquisition of McDonnell Douglas in 1997.) The American team had greatly increased their chances of success by using several aircraft and pre-positioning large caches of fuel, spare parts, and other support equipment along the route. They often had several US Navy destroyers deployed in support. At prearranged way points, the World Flight's aircraft had their engines changed five times and new wings fitted twice.

== Itinerary ==
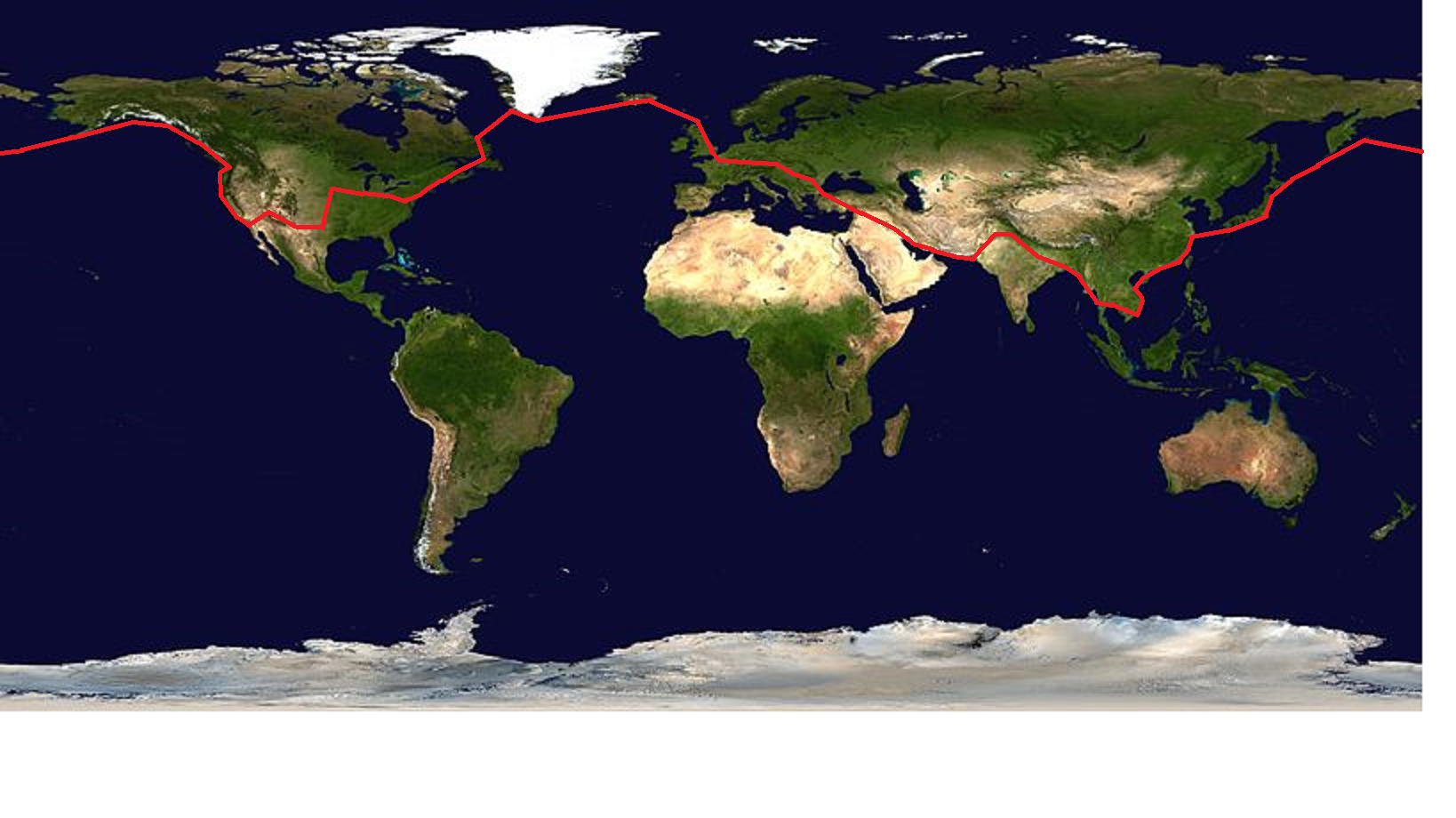
Itinerary of the first aerial circumnavigation

The flight traveled from east to west, beginning in Seattle, Washington, in April 1924 and returning to its start point in September. It flew northwest to Alaska; across northern Pacific islands to Japan and then south Asia; across to Europe and the Atlantic Ocean. The route's most southerly point was Saigon in Vietnam (10° N), while the northernmost stop was in Reykjavík, Iceland at 64°08' N. The refueling stops were:

- United States: Sand Point, Lake Washington, Seattle, Washington 6 April 1924
- Canada: Seal Cove, Prince Rupert, British Columbia
- Alaska: Sitka, Seward and Chignik
- Aleutian Islands: Dutch Harbor, Atka and Attu Island
- Soviet Union: Bering Island
- Japan: Paramushiru, Hitokappu, Minato, Lake Kasumigaura, Kushimoto and Kagoshima
- China: Shanghai, Tchinkoen (Qingchuan) Bay, Amoy (Xiamen)
- Hong Kong
- French Indochina (Vietnam): Gulf of Tonkin (Haiphong), Tourane (Da Nang), Huế (Chicago only), and Saigon (Ho Chi Minh City)
- Thailand: Bangkok
- Raj Burma: Tavoy (Dawei), Rangoon and Akyab (Sittwe)
- Raj India: Chittagong, Calcutta, Allahabad, Ambala, Multan, Karachi
- Persia: Chabahar, Bandar Abbas and Bushehr
- Iraq: Baghdad
- Syria: Aleppo
- Turkey: Istanbul
- Romania: Bucharest
- Hungary: Budapest
- Austria: Vienna
- France: Strasbourg and Paris
- United Kingdom: Croydon (London); Brough (Yorkshire); Scapa Flow (Kirkwall, Orkney)
- Iceland: Hornafjörður and Reykjavík
- Greenland: Fredricksdal and Ivigtut (Ivittuut)
- Newfoundland and Labrador: Icy Tickle and Hawkes Bay
- Canada: Pictou Harbour, Nova Scotia
- United States: Casco Bay, Maine; Boston, Massachusetts; Mitchel Field, New York; Bolling Field, Washington, D.C.
Across the U.S. – 14 cities in nine states; and Seattle, Washington: 28 September 1924

== Subsequent disposition of equipment and crew ==
At the request of the Smithsonian Institution, the US War Department transferred ownership of Chicago to the museum for display. It made its last flight from Dayton, Ohio, to Washington, D.C., on 25 September 1925. It was almost immediately put on display in the Smithsonian's Arts and Industries Building. In 1974, Chicago was restored under the direction of Walter Roderick, and transferred to the new National Air and Space Museum building for display in their Barron Hilton Pioneers of Flight exhibition gallery.

Beginning in 1957, New Orleans was displayed at the National Museum of the United States Air Force in Dayton. The aircraft was on loan from the Los Angeles County Museum of Natural History and was returned in 2005. Since February 2012, New Orleans is at the Museum of Flying in Santa Monica, California.

The wreckage of Seattle was recovered and is now on display in the Alaska Aviation Heritage Museum. The original Boston sank in the North Atlantic, and it is thought that the only surviving piece of the original prototype, the Boston II, is the aircraft data plate, now in a private collection, and a scrap of fuselage skin, in the collection of the Vintage Wings & Wheels Museum in Poplar Grove, Illinois.

All six airmen were awarded the Distinguished Service Medal by vote of the United States Congress, the first time the award had been made for acts not in war, and they were excused from the prohibition against accepting awards from foreign countries.

The best in flight Mackay Trophy for 1924 was awarded to Smith, Arnold, Wade, Nelson and Ogden. Later, Martin was in command of Army aviation units in Hawaii at the time of the Japanese attack on Pearl Harbor. His mechanic Harvey was commissioned and commanded heavy bomb groups during World War II. Nelson rose to the rank of colonel and became one of General Henry Arnold's chief trouble-shooters on the development and operational deployment of the Boeing B-29 Superfortress.

=== Image gallery ===
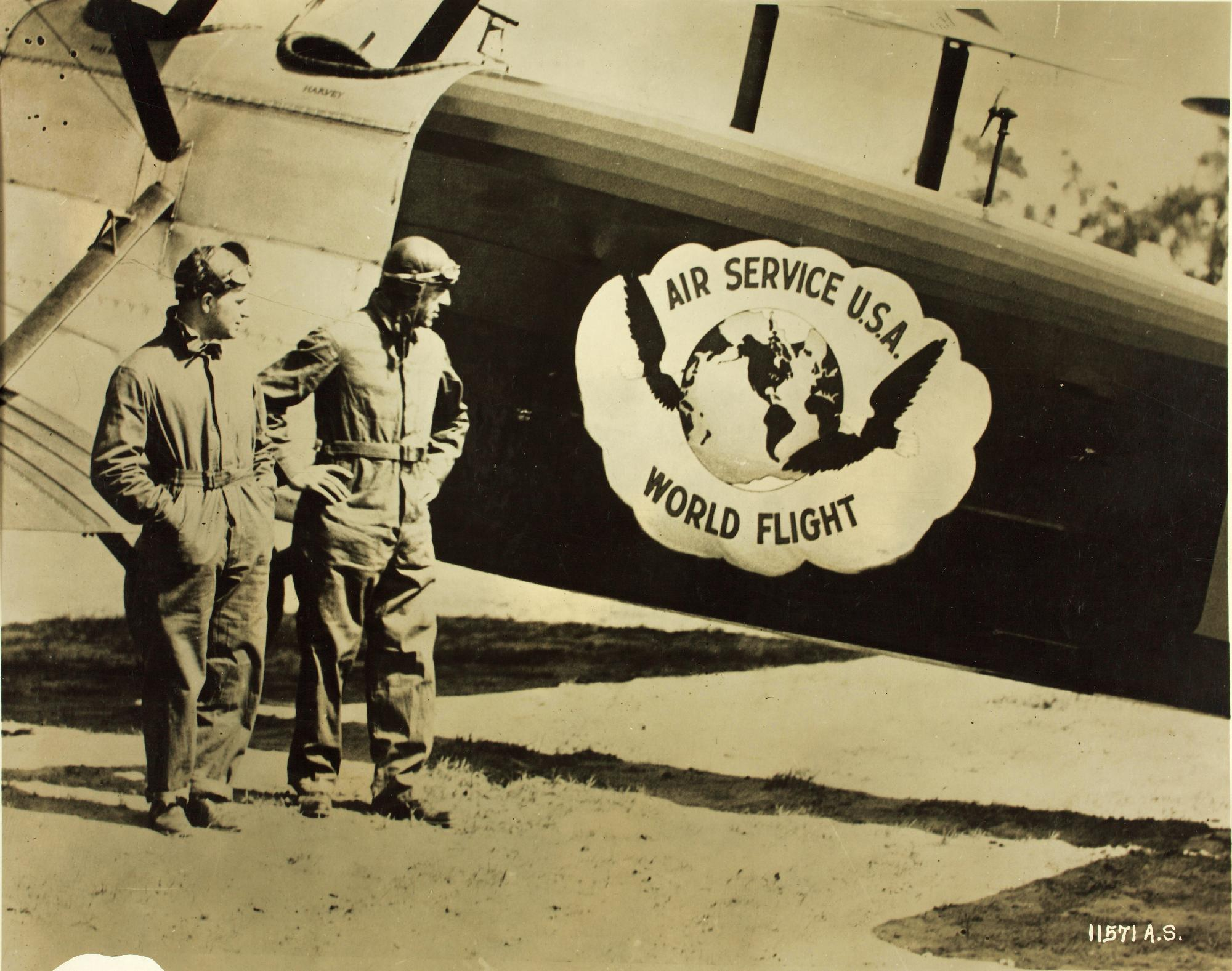
No. 1 Seattle, crashed/destroyed, crew survived

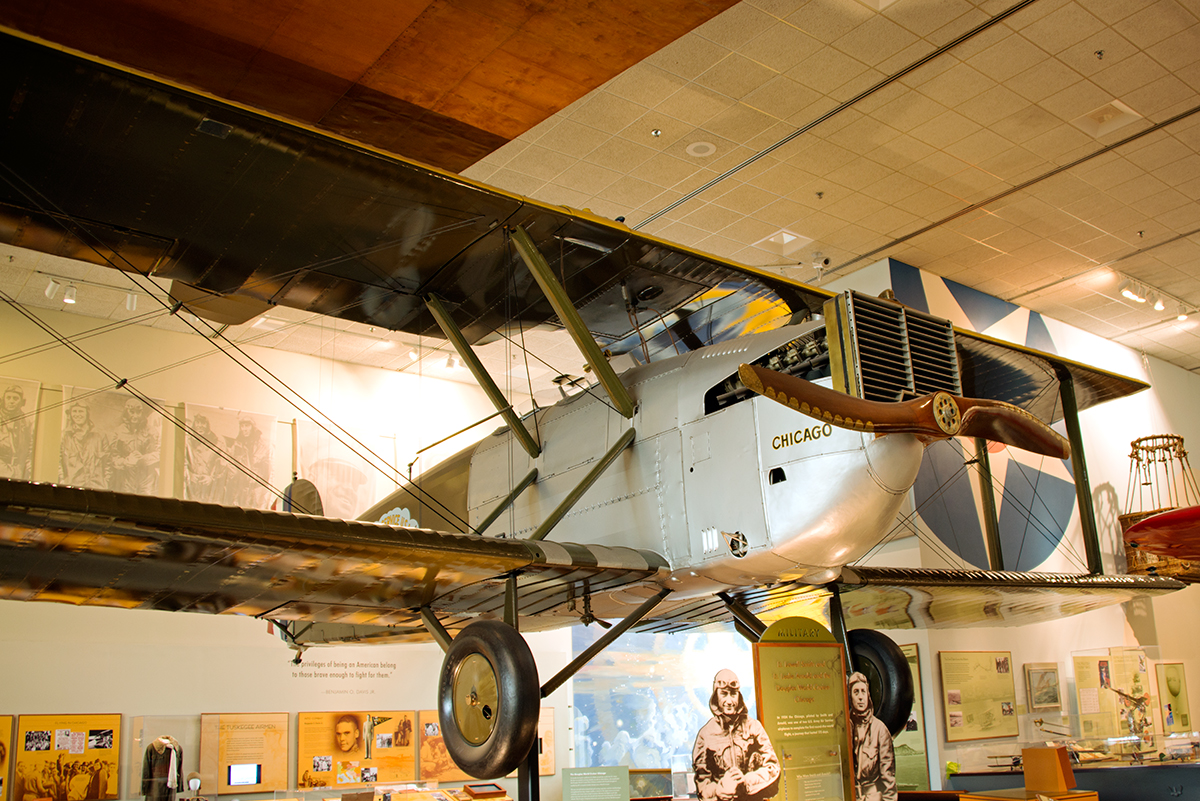
No. 2 Chicago, at the National Air and Space Museum

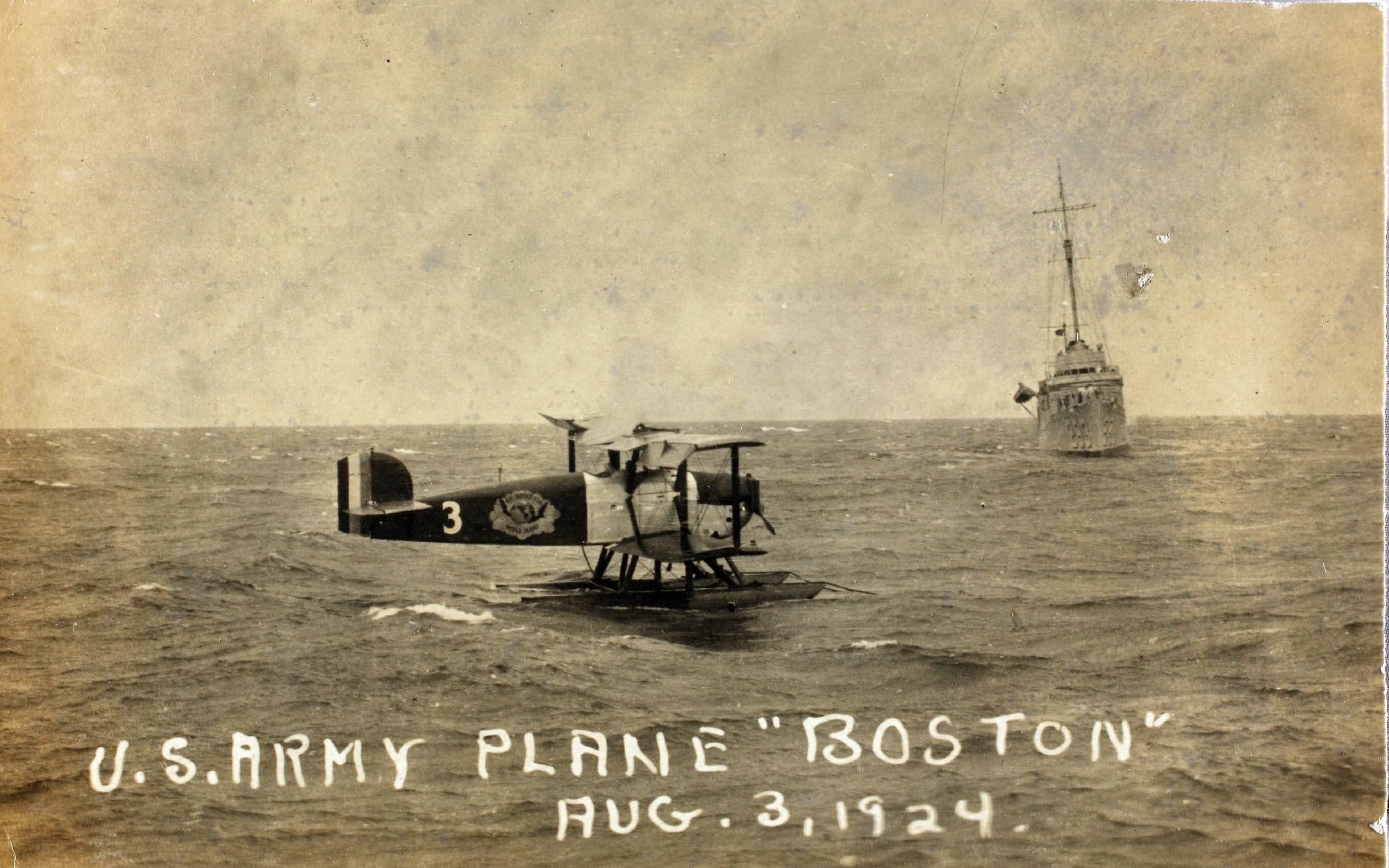
No. 3 Boston, August 3, 1924; sunk/lost at sea, crew survived

No. 4 New Orleans, being installed at the Museum of Flying, 2012.

== Cross-equator circumnavigation ==
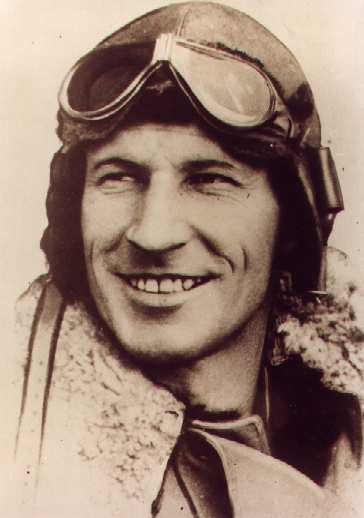
Charles Kingsford Smith

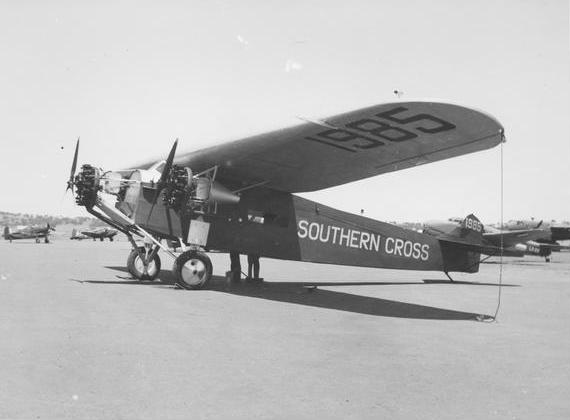
Southern Cross at a RAAF base near Canberra in 1943

The first aerial circumnavigation of the world that involved the crossing of the equator twice occurred from 1928 to 1930, and was made using a single aircraft, the Southern Cross, a Fokker F.VII trimotor monoplane crewed by Charles Kingsford Smith (lead pilot), Charles Ulm (relief pilot), James Warner (radio operator), and Harry Lyon (navigator and engineer).

After completing the first trans-Pacific crossing on 9 June 1928, flying from Oakland, California, to Brisbane, Australia (with stops in Hawaii and Fiji), Kingsford Smith and Ulm spent several months making other long-distance flights across Australia and to New Zealand. They decided to use their trans-Pacific flight as the first leg of a globe-circling flight. They flew the Southern Cross to England in June 1929, then across the Atlantic and North America, returning, in 1930, to Oakland where their 1928 trans-Pacific flight had begun.

Before Kingsford Smith's death in 1935, he donated the Southern Cross to the Commonwealth of Australia, for display in a museum. The aircraft is preserved in a special glass hangar memorial on Airport Drive, near the International Terminal at Brisbane Airport in Queensland, Australia.

== See also ==
- List of circumnavigations: Aerial
