= Frederick Martin (general) =

United States Army Air Forces general

Frederick Leroy Martin
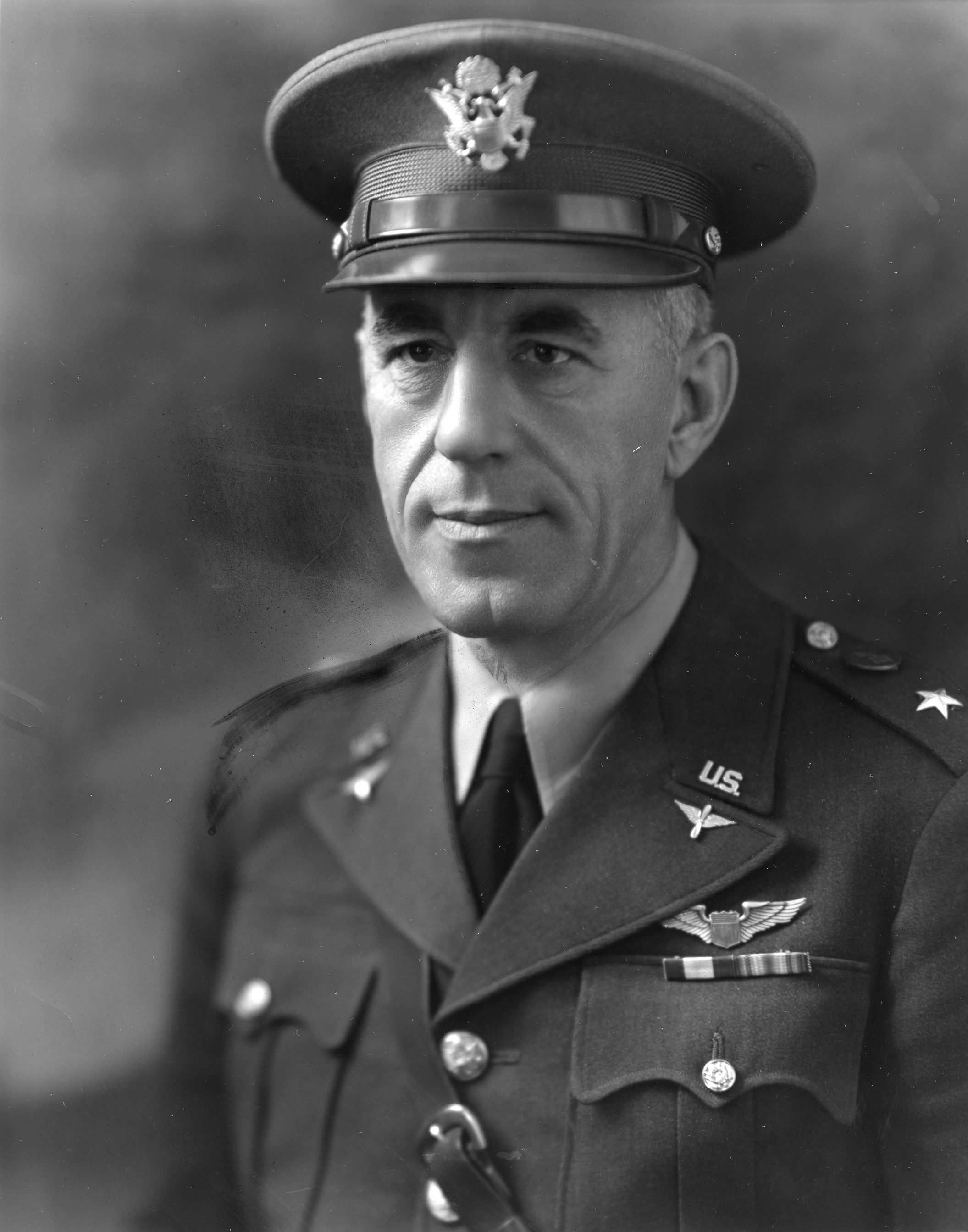
- Martin as Brigadier general
- Born: November 22, 1882; Liberty, Indiana, US
- Died: February 23, 1954 (aged 71); Los Angeles, California, US
- Burial place: Arlington National Cemetery
- Military career
- Allegiance: United States
- Branch: United States Army Air Forces
- Service years: 1908–1944
- Rank: Major General
- Commands: 3rd Wing, Barksdale Field, LA; Hawaiian Air Force, Hickam Field, HI; Second Air Force, Fort George Wright, WA; Central Technical Training Command, St. Louis, MO
- Conflicts: World War I; World War II; Attack on Pearl Harbor
- Awards: Distinguished Service Medal; Legion of Merit

Frederick Leroy Martin (November 22, 1882 – February 23, 1954) was an American airman best known as the first commander of the US Army Air Service's first aerial circumnavigation of the world in 1924 and as the commander of US Army Air Forces during the Attack on Pearl Harbor. Martin, a major at the time, commanded the circumnavigation and piloted the Douglas World Cruiser Seattle, until he crashed in a remote portion of the Alaskan Aleutian Peninsula, after which he relinquished command to Lt Lowell Smith. Martin received the Distinguished Service Medal for his part in the circumnavigation. By the beginning of World War II, Martin had been promoted to major general and assigned to command the Hawaiian Air Force of two Wings (18th Bombardment Wing at Hickam Field and 14th Pursuit Wing at Wheeler Field) and outlying airfields at Bellows Field and Haleiwa Fighter Strip. Martin was temporarily relieved of command after the attack on Pearl Harbor, but was exonerated by the presidential Roberts Commission and given a new command.

== Early life ==
Martin was born November 22, 1882, to the farming family of John and Nancy Martin in Liberty, Indiana. In 1904, he enrolled in the Purdue University school of Mechanical Engineering. He was active in the predecessor program to the Reserve Officer Training Corps, with his yearbook photo caption calling him "possessed with the idea that he must become a soldier." He commissioned as a Second Lieutenant of Coast Artillery in 1908, and reported to the remote Fort Flagler in Washington State, guarding the entrance to the Puget Sound.

During his time at Fort Flagler, he married Grace Margaret Griffiths, of Port Townsend, Washington. In 1916, they had a child, John R. Martin, who eventually became a colonel in the United States Air Force and shares a tombstone with his father in Arlington National Cemetery.

== Aviator ==
In 1917, now Major Martin transferred to the Aviation division of the Signal Corps. Though he deployed to Europe with the Aviation division during World War I, he was not yet trained as a pilot, and spent the war working in supply and logistics. Upon his return from Europe, Martin trained as a flier in 1920 and began a series of assignments in flight and technical training.

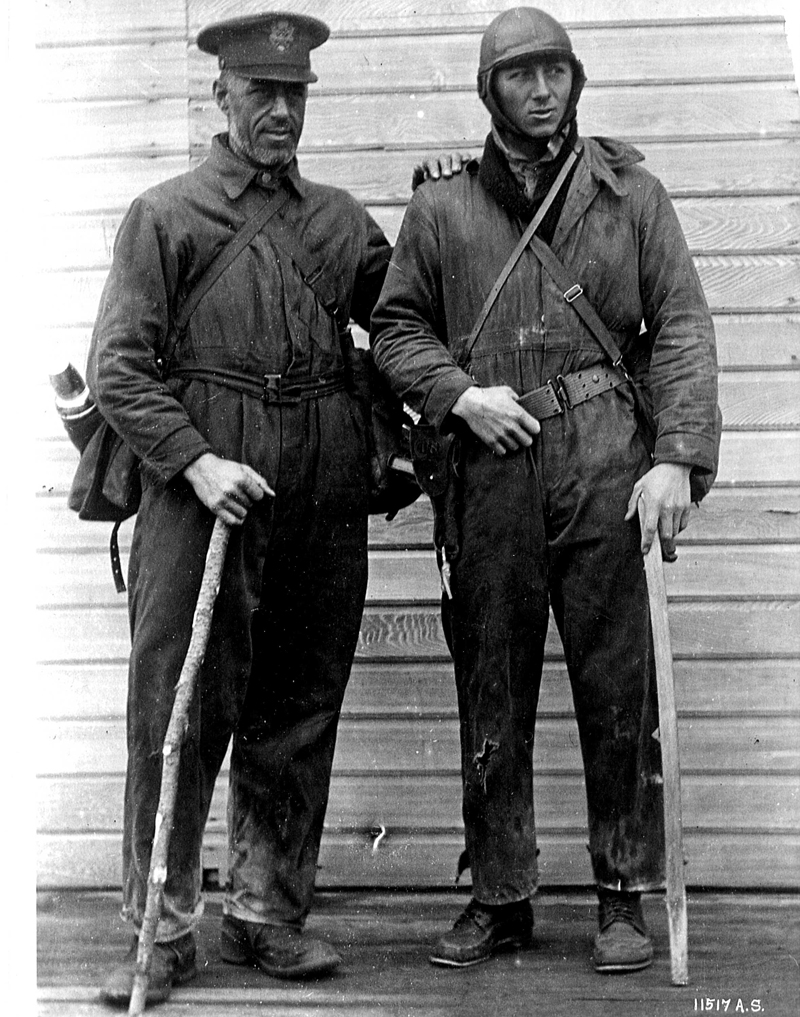
Major Martin and Sergeant Harvey at Port Moller after crash of the Seattle

In 1923, Major Martin was selected to command the US Army Air Service's first aerial circumnavigation. Martin piloted the Douglas World Cruiser Seattle from March 17, 1924, until April 30. On that day, already separated from the rest of the planes after losing an engine and being stuck in the remote Alaskan village of Chignik, Martin struck a mountain on the Aleutian Peninsula in the fog. While the Navy and Coast Guard searched, Major Martin and his mechanic Sergeant Harvey hiked down the mountain to a fishing cannery near Port Moller, Alaska. During their ten days in the wild, they lived on concentrated emergency rations and at one point took shelter in an abandoned trapper's cabin. Though the original plan had been for the prototype Douglas World Cruiser to be upgraded to match the operational aircraft and for Martin to rejoin his command, when it became obvious that the time required would entail missing over half of the circumnavigation, Major Martin requested that "in fairness to Lieutenant Smith, who succeeded me in command, I think he should so continue and himself bring the flight back to the United States." All of the World Fliers, even those like Major Martin who did not complete the entire trip, received the Distinguished Service Cross for their part in the circumnavigation.

Martin continued to be promoted and had several assignments leading aviation training. In 1937, he was promoted to brigadier general and took command of the 3rd Wing (later 3rd Bombardment Wing) and Barksdale Field in Louisiana. In 1940, with American entry into World War II looking imminent, he was promoted to major general and assigned to command the Hawaiian Air Force.

== Pearl Harbor attack and aftermath ==
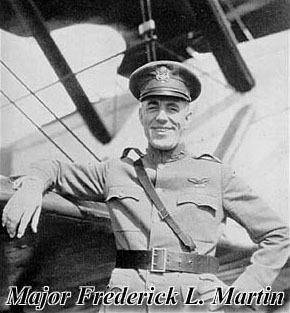
Martin as Major during US Army World Flight

As commander of Army Air Forces in Hawaii, Major General Martin coordinated with his Navy counterpart, Admiral Patrick N. L. Bellinger to plan the defense of Hawaii in case of Japanese attack. The two wrote the (then classified) "Martin-Bellinger Report" that both correctly assessed the most likely Japanese course-of-action should they attack and that the US did not have sufficient patrol planes to reliably detect an attack. They warned "in a dawn air attack there is a high probability that it could be delivered as a complete surprise in spite of any patrols we might be using and that it might find us in a condition of readiness under which pursuit would be slow to start." Martin requested additional aircraft both in this report and in a follow-up through Army Air Corps channels a few months later, but what planes he did receive were ordered on to forward bases expected to bear the brunt of any fighting.

When the attack on Pearl Harbor did come on December 7, 1941, the Martin-Bellinger report proved prophetic. The damage was exacerbated by Hawaii Army District Commander Lieutenant General Walter Short ordering Alert Number One. The measures in this alert were designed to make sabotage easier to guard against, but they also gathered aircraft together in ways that made it easier to attack them from the air. In the aftermath of the attack, General Short, his Navy counterpart Admiral Husband E. Kimmel and General Martin were all relieved of command. However, the presidential Roberts Commission determined that General Martin had done all he could to improve the islands' readiness, and he was sent to a larger command, Second Air Force, headquartered at Fort George Wright, Washington and responsible for bomber training and defense of the Pacific Northwest.

== Later life ==
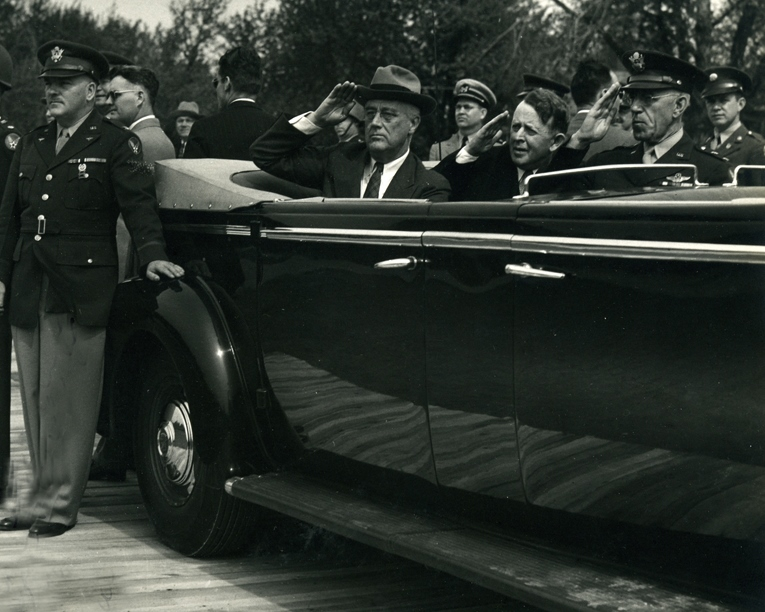
President Roosevelt and Major General Martin (on right) inspect Jefferson Barracks in St. Louis, Missouri

In July 1942, General Martin took command of the Second District, Army Air Forces Technical Training Command (AAFTTC), St. Louis, Missouri. He served in this position for much of the rest of the war, with his command changing names when AAFTTC consolidated from five districts into three and General Martin's became the Central Technical Training Command. In 1944, Martin was hospitalized for ulcers, and when news came that his command was closing as war training wound down, he retired. He was awarded the Legion of Merit upon retiring for his "distinguished services rendered during the meteoric expansion of the A.A.F. training program."

Major General Martin retired in Los Angeles, California. He died on February 24, 1954, and was buried at Arlington National Cemetery. Four years later, his wife Grace died and was buried next to him. His son John R. Martin would be buried sharing his father's tombstone upon his death in 1989.

== Dates of rank ==
- Second Lieutenant, 1908
- First Lieutenant, March 11, 1911
- Captain, July 1, 1916
- Major (temporary), Aug. 5, 1917. He reverted to his permanent rank of captain on March 15, 1920, and was promoted to major, Regular Army, on July 1, 1920
- Lieutenant Colonel, Aug. 31, 1933
- Colonel (temporary), June 15, 1935
- Brigadier General (temporary), Feb. 15, 1937
- Major General (temporary), Oct. 1, 1940.
