= Museum of Flying =

- Museums location in Santa Monica, CA
- Former name: Douglas Museum and Library
- Established: November 1974
- Location: Santa Monica, California
- Coordinates: 34.014722222222°N 118.44777777778°W
- Type: Aviation museum
- Key holdings: Aircraft: Beech Staggerwing; Boeing Stearman; Cessna L-19 "Bird Dog"; North American SNJ-5; Ryan PT-22; Wright Flyer Replica; Artifacts: Allison J33-A-23 engine; Boeing 727 cockpit; Convair 240 cockpit
- Founder: Donald Douglas, Jr.
- Director: Steve Benesch
- President: David G. Price
- Website: www.museumofflying.org
Museum of Flying
- Tax ID no.: 23-7412316

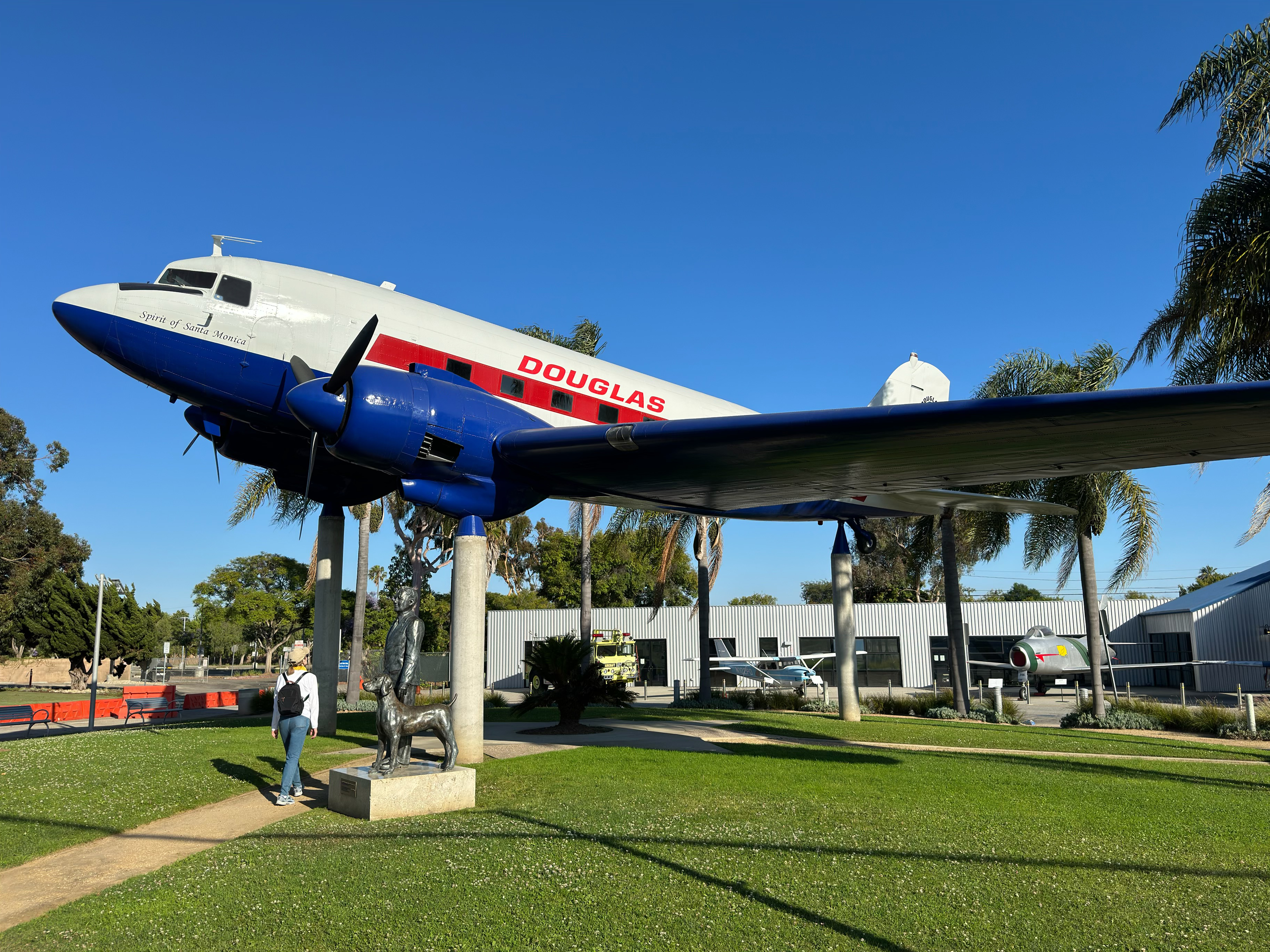
Douglas DC-3 built in 1942 as a 28-seat paratrooper and glider tag. Retired from military service in 1946, now on display at Museum of Flying, July 2024

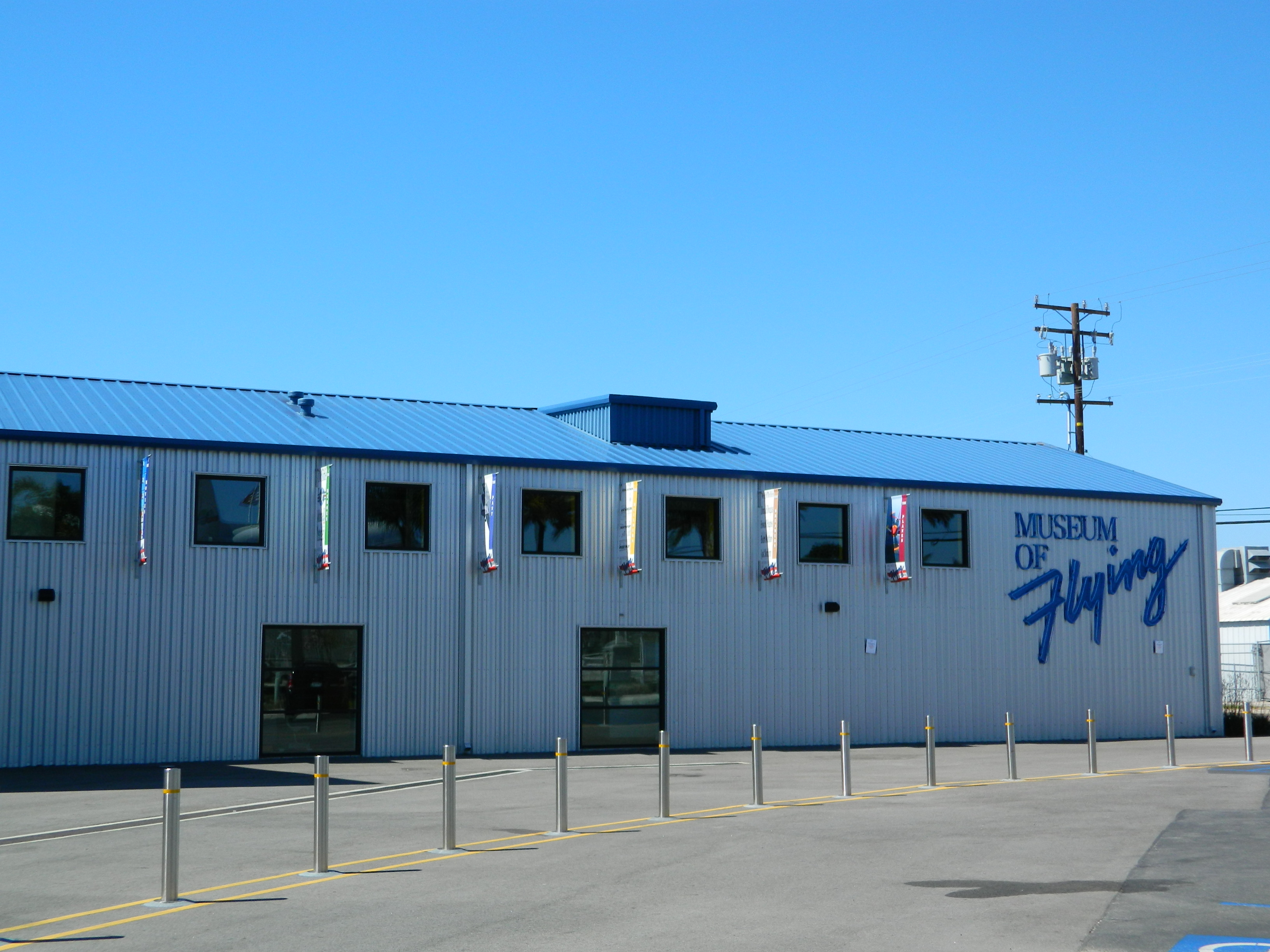
Santa Monica Museum of Flying, exterior view

Statue of Donald W. Douglas Sr. with the Spirit of Santa Monica, a modified DC-3, outside the Museum

The Museum of Flying is a private non-profit aerospace museum in Santa Monica, California. It was founded in 1974, closed in 2002, and reopened in 2012 in a new facility. The Museum exhibits the history of aviation, focusing on aviation history, with an emphasis on Donald Douglas and the Douglas Aircraft Company, in Southern California.

== History ==
In 1974 the Douglas Museum and Library was located on the South side of the Santa Monica Airport. Later the Museum migrated to the North side of the Airport and reopened there as the Museum of Flying in April 1989. The Museum gradually grew to a collection of over 50 vintage aircraft, many of which were built in Southern California and are still in flight-ready condition.

The museum's collection of artifacts, exhibits, and aviation art chronicle the development of aviation in Southern California. The anchor aircraft for the Museum was the Douglas World Cruiser, "New Orleans" which made the first circumnavigation of the globe along with its sister ship, "Chicago", in 1924. The "Chicago" now resides at the Smithsonian Institution's National Air and Space Museum.

Over the next several years, the museum played host to many historic and memorable special events and activities, including "A Walk on the Moon" in 1999 in which seven NASA lunar astronauts were present .

One of the most popular programs was the children's A's Award Flight Program. On pre-selected dates, children achieving the letter grade "A" in any academic subject could receive a free airplane ride as a reward for dedication toward education. The museum also featured a number of other educational programs for both children and adults; including weekend family workshops and a volunteer presentation series.

The museum was forced to temporarily close in July 2002 due to economic problems. Since that time, museum officials executed a lease agreement with the City of Santa Monica for the leasehold at 3100 Airport Avenue. The expansion and remodeling project had an estimated cost of nearly $2 million. Construction at the new location was completed in 2012.

== Exhibits and features ==
The museum features a display and exhibit area of nearly 22,000 square feet (2,000 m^{2}).

The museum provides displays and interpretive exhibits on the history of flight and the development and growth of the aviation and aerospace industry in Southern California and places heavy emphasis on the Douglas Aircraft Company and the history of the Santa Monica Airport.

The museum features approximately a dozen aircraft chronicling flight from its beginning with a replica Wright Flyer and Lockheed Vega both of which are featured in the film Night at the Museum: Battle of the Smithsonian. Both of these artifacts were donated by 20th Century-Fox studios. Static models of a North American F-86 Sabre and Douglas A-4 Skyhawk dominate the front of the Museum. A partial exterior Boeing 727-200 nose section, from a former Federal Express freight aircraft, is accessible to all. The Museum also features a broad collection of aviation art, rare artifacts, and ephemera from famous aviators, as well as an extensive collection of photographs of historic aircraft and aircraft manufacturing.

The Mezzanine features a recreation of the Douglas Aircraft Company Executive Board room, and a recreation of the office of Donald W. Douglas, Founder & Chairman of the Douglas Aircraft Company. The mezzanine also houses the new Museum Theater and Screening Room.

The museum also features a Max Flight FS 3000 simulator which offers 360 degrees of full range motion with surround sound and HD capabilities. This is the only simulator of its kind in the Los Angeles area.

== See also ==
- List of aviation museums
