= Douglas Park (disambiguation) =

Douglas Park may refer to

== Places ==
- Douglas Park, a Scottish stadium
- Douglas Park, New South Wales, an Australian town
- Douglass Park, a Chicago park formerly named Douglas Park
- Douglas Park (Langley), an urban public park in British Columbia, Canada
- Douglass Park (Lexington, Kentucky), park established for African Americans in Lexington, Kentucky
- Douglas Park (Rock Island), a stadium that served as home for the Rock Island Independents professional American football team
- Douglas Park (Santa Monica), a park in Santa Monica, California

== People ==
- Brad Park (Douglas Bradford Park; born 1948), Canadian ice hockey player
- Douglas Park (businessman), owner of Park's Motor Group and chairman of Rangers Football Club

== See also ==
- Stephen A. Douglas Tomb, also known as Douglas Monument Park, Chicago park
