= Lowell Smith =

US Army Air Corps pilot (1892–1945)

Lowell Herbert Smith
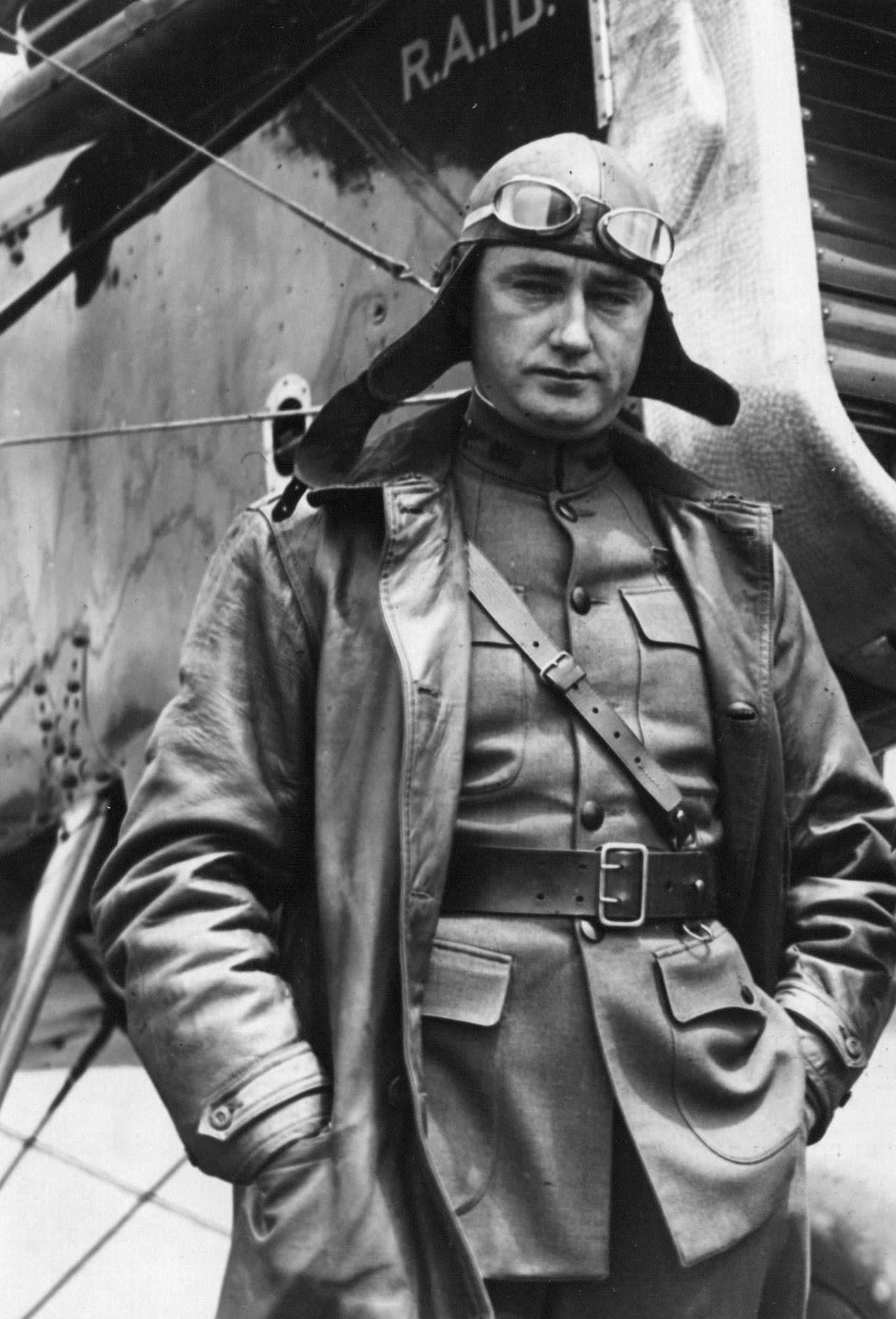
- Born: October 8, 1892; Santa Barbara, California, U.S.
- Died: 4 November 1945 (aged 53); Tucson, Arizona, U.S.
- Burial place: Arlington National Cemetery
- Military career
- Allegiance: United States of America
- Branch: United States Army Air Service; United States Army Air Corps
- Service years: 1917–1945
- Rank: Colonel
- Conflicts: Mexican Revolution; World War II
- Awards: Distinguished Flying Cross; Distinguished Service Medal; Mackay Trophy

Lowell Herbert Smith (October 8, 1892 – November 4, 1945) was a pioneer American airman who piloted the first airplane to receive a complete mid-air refueling (along with Lt. John P. Richter) on June 27, 1923, and later set an endurance record of 37 hours on August 28, both in a De Havilland DH-4B. Smith also piloted the Douglas World Cruiser Chicago, which along with one other made the first aerial circumnavigation in 1924. Smith held 16 records for military aircraft in speed, endurance and distance. He was awarded the best achievement in flight Mackay Trophy twice.

== Early life ==
Smith was born October 8, 1892, in Santa Barbara, California, to the Rev. Jasper G Smith, the second of four children. The family subsequently moved to North Yakima and Spokane in Washington, then to San Fernando, California, as his father sought work as a mechanical and electrical engineer. Smith received his high school education in San Fernando and went on to college but left his studies to work in a pumping plant in the Mojave Desert and then as a mechanic in an automobile repair shop. He learned to fly after finding work in mines south of Battle Mountain, Nevada.

Smith then decided to join Pancho Villa's revolutionary army in Mexico where he became engineering officer of its tiny three-aircraft air service and he subsequently flew reconnaissance for a time in 1915 before all three aircraft were lost.

== Aviator ==
Back at Battle Mountain in 1917, the entry of the United States into the First World War inspired Smith's joining the Air Service in San Francisco. He took a course in aeronautics at the University of California and he was posted to Rockwell Field, near San Diego, and then Kelly Field, Texas, as a flying instructor. He did not see active service in the war. After a period as Engineering Officer at Rockwell Field after the war, he was given command of the 20 aircraft 91st Squadron, flying fire patrols in the Pacific Northwest, where he served for four years.

In 1919, he found himself able to participate in the Trans-Continental Speed, Reliability and Endurance Contest. However, on the evening of October 15 his aircraft was destroyed by fire when lanterns being used by mechanics ignited a wing. Smith received permission to continue the race if he could find a replacement aircraft. Prospects seemed dim until Major Carl Andrew Spaatz arrived on October 17. It took only a little pleading before Spaatz agreed to turn over his plane to Smith. Going on to conquer wind and weather, Smith became the first person to fly from San Francisco to Chicago and the first West Coast flier to complete the round trip, on October 21.

In June 1923, Smith and Lt. Paul Richter performed the first ever mid-air refuelling, between a pair of De Havilland Airco DH.4Bs. During the flight, he broke 16 world records for flight distance, speed and duration, remaining airborne for 37 hours 15 minutes. By the time of the round the world flight, Smith had accumulated over 2,000 hours' flying time.

In 1924, Smith then a lieutenant, was made flight commander of the mission to be the first to fly around the world. Major Frederick L. Martin originally led the flight from Seattle, but crashed his plane in Alaska, therefore, Smith took over leadership of the expedition. During the stopover in Thailand he developed dysentery from which he did not recover until the expeditionary flight was completed. Smith (as well as the other World Fliers) received the Distinguished Service Cross for the circumnavigation.

In 1936, Smith was promoted to major and appointed to the War Department Board for standardizing airplane design and procurement procedures. He was promoted to colonel in March 1941. Under his guidance from February 1942 to March 1943, Davis-Monthan became the top training base for B-17 and B-24 crews during World War II.

In March 1945, Smith was in charge of anti-submarine patrols off of South American coasts.

After the war's end, Smith died in November 1945 from injuries suffered when he fell from a horse in the Catalina Foothills, Arizona. He was buried at Arlington National Cemetery, in Arlington, Virginia. Lowell H. Smith Elementary School in Tucson, Arizona, was named after him.

== Awards ==
- Command Pilot Wings
- Distinguished Service Medal
- Distinguished Flying Cross
- World War I Victory Medal
- American Defense Service Medal
- American Campaign Medal
- World War II Victory Medal
- MacKay Trophy – twice awarded
- Helen Culver Gold Medal (1925)

=== Distinguished Service Medal Citation ===
The President of the United States of America, authorized by Act of Congress, July 9, 1918, takes pleasure in presenting the Army Distinguished Service Medal to Captain (Air Service) Lowell H. Smith, United States Army Air Service, for exceptionally meritorious and distinguished services to the Government of the United States, in a duty of great responsibility during World War I. Lieutenant Smith, as Pilot of the Airplane No. 2, the "Chicago," and later when placed in command of the United States Army Air Service around-the-world flight from 6 April 1924 to 28 September 1924, displayed untiring energy, courage, and resourcefulness during the entire period that the Air Service expedition was upon its hazardous undertaking. His leadership, sound judgment, and tenacity of purpose were material factors in the success of this pioneer flight of airplanes around the world. In the performance of his great task he brought to himself and to the military forces of the United States the signal honor of an achievement which is a testimonial to American thoroughness, courage, and resourcefulness.

General Orders: War Department, General Orders No. 14 (1925)

Action Date: April 6 – September 28, 1924

=== Distinguished Flying Cross Citation ===
The President of the United States of America, authorized by Act of Congress, July 2, 1926, takes pleasure in presenting the Distinguished Flying Cross to First Lieutenant (Air Service) Lowell H. Smith, U.S. Army Air Service, for extraordinary achievement while participating in an aerial flight. Lieutenant Smith and Lieutenant John P. Richter were the pioneers in establishing the practicability in refueling airplanes while in flight, and on 28–29 June 1923, they piloted an airplane refueled in flight for 37 hours, 15 minutes and 14 and a half seconds, breaking the endurance record, the speed records from 2,500 to 5,000 kilometers, and the distance record (5,300 kilometers). By their endurance, resourcefulness, and determination they reflected great credit upon themselves and the Army of the United States.

General Orders: War Department, General Orders No. 16 (1929)

Action Date: June 28–29, 1923

== Dates of rank ==
- Enlisted: 7 June 1917
- 1st Lieutenant, Officer Reserve Corps: 13 December 1917
- Captain, National Army: 23 October 1918
- Captain, Regular Army: 1 July 1920
- 1st Lieutenant, Regular Army: 18 November 1922
- Captain, Regular Army: 4 December 1924
- Major, Temporary: 16 June 1936
- Major, Regular Army: 26 June 1936
- Lieutenant Colonel, Temporary: 1 March 1940
- Lieutenant Colonel, Regular Army: 30 August 1940
- Colonel, Temporary: 14 March 1941
- Colonel, Army of the United States: 1 February 1942
