= Roberts Commissions =

United States government commissions of the 1940s

The Roberts Commission is one of two presidentially-appointed commissions. One related to the circumstances of the Japanese attack on Pearl Harbor, and another related to the protection of cultural resources during and after World War II. Both were chaired by Supreme Court Justice Owen Roberts.

== First Roberts Commission ==
The first Roberts Commission was a presidentially-appointed commission formed in December 1941, shortly after the attack on Pearl Harbor by the Japanese, to investigate and report the facts relating to the attack. The commission was headed by US Supreme Court Associate Justice Owen Roberts and so it was known as the Roberts Commission. The commission found the commanders of Pearl Harbor, Admiral Husband Kimmel and General Walter Short, guilty of "dereliction of duty." It exonerated Hawaiian Air Force commander Major General Frederick L. Martin who had also been relieved of command immediately following the attack and his Navy counterpart Patrick N. L. Bellinger (who had not been relieved) with the simple statement "subordinate commanders executed their superiors' orders without question. They were not responsible for the state of readiness prescribed." The Commission presented its findings to Congress January 28, 1942. Members of the commission besides Justice Roberts were Adm. William H. Standley, Adm. Joseph M. Reeves, Gen. Frank R. McCoy, and Gen. Joseph T. McNarney. The commission was a fact-finding commission, not a court-martial for either Short or Kimmel.

Some claimed that the report also concluded that both Japanese diplomats and persons of Japanese ancestry had engaged in widespread espionage leading up to the attack, and used this to justify Japanese American incarceration. One passage made vague reference to "Japanese consular agents and other... persons having no open relations with the Japanese foreign service" transmitting information to Japan. However, it was unlikely that these "spies" were Japanese American, as Japanese intelligence agents were distrustful of their American counterparts and preferred to recruit "white persons and Negroes". Despite the fact that the report made no mention of Americans of Japanese ancestry, the media, as well as politicians like California Governor Culbert L. Olson, nevertheless used it to vilify Japanese Americans and inflame public opinion against them.

== Second Roberts Commission ==
The second Roberts Commission, also presidential-appointed, is also known after its chairman, again Supreme Court Justice Owen Roberts. It was created to help the US Army protect works of cultural value in Allied-occupied areas of Europe. Its formal name was the American Commission for the Protection and Salvage of Artistic and Historic Monuments in War Areas. The commission also developed inventories of Nazi-appropriated property. Along with the US Military program known as Monuments, Fine Arts, and Archives (MFAA), the commission worked to rescue and preserve items of cultural significance. The commission took place from 1943 to 1946.
