= Donald Wills Douglas Jr. =

American businessman

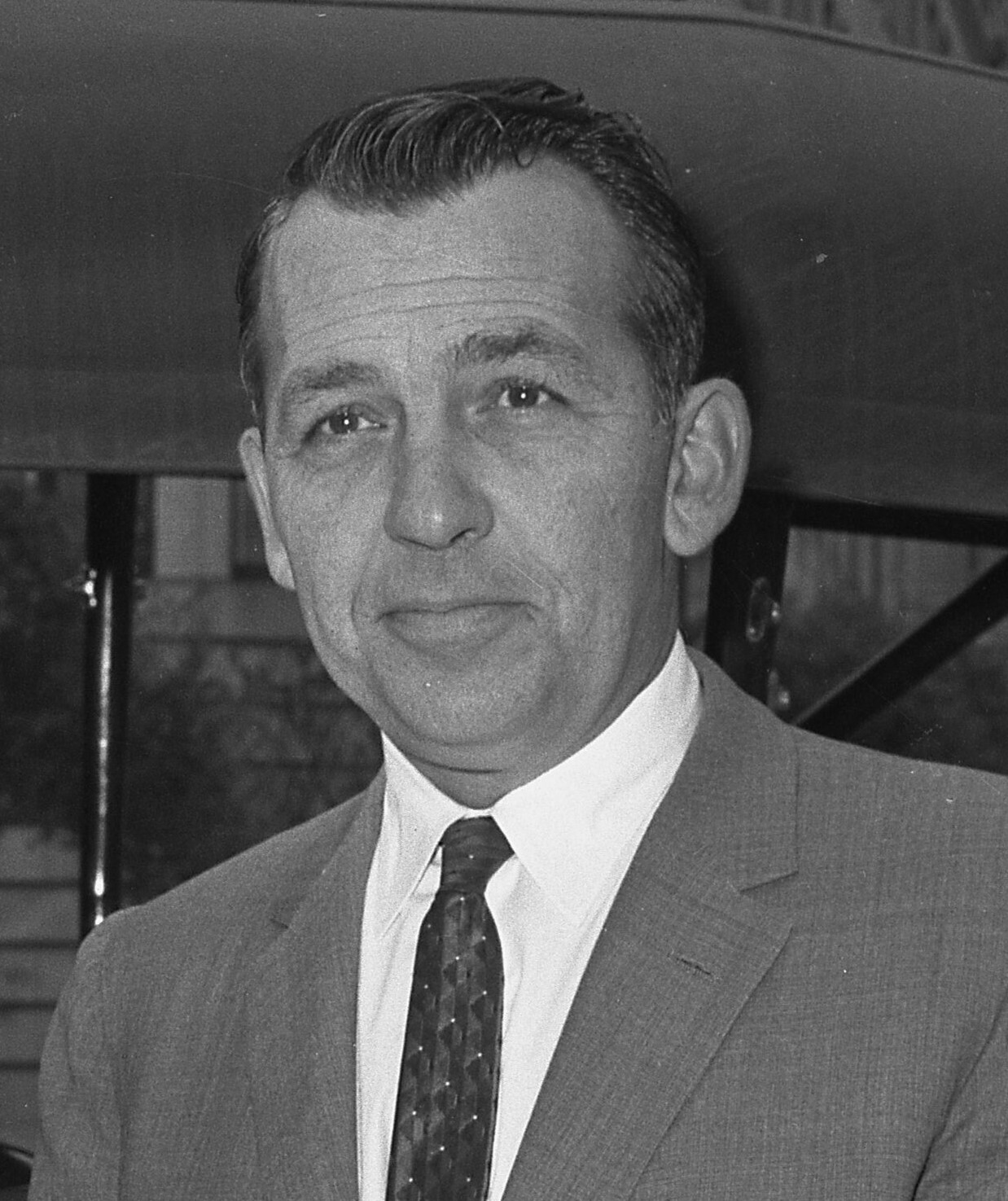
- Douglas in 1963
- Born: July 3, 1917
- Died: October 3, 2004 (aged 87)
- Occupations: Industrialist, sportsman
- Organization(s): Douglas Aircraft Company; McDonnell Douglas
- Sports career
Medal record
Sailing
Representing the United States
Silver medal – second place	1932 Los Angeles	6 meter class

Donald Wills Douglas Jr. (July 3, 1917 – October 3, 2004) was an American industrialist and sportsman who competed in the 1932 Summer Olympics, the Transpacific Yacht Race, and in equestrian dressage competitions.

He was the president of the Douglas Aircraft Company, which his father, Donald Wills Douglas Sr. founded, from 1957 to 1967, when the company merged with McDonnell Aircraft Corporation. He was on the board of directors of Douglas Aircraft from 1953 until the merger, then on the board of McDonnell Douglas from 1967 to 1989. He was involved in other enterprises, including the Capistrano Bank in Orange County, California, in early manufacturing robotics software, and in real estate partnerships. He studied mechanical engineering at Stanford University and completed his education at the Curtiss-Wright Technical Institute in Glendale, California.

In 1932 he was a crew member of the American boat Gallant, which won the silver medal in the 6 metre class in the summer Olympics, held in Los Angeles, Calif.

In 1943, he was appointed manager of flight test in the Douglas Aircraft Company. In World War II he supervised the flight testing of practically every type of aircraft built by Douglas at the time, including SBD Dauntless and C-54 Skymaster. Later, he was named director of the testing division. The DC-6 and DC-7 airliners obtained type certification under his direction.

In 1952, he and his brother Jim persuaded Ralph Larrabee, the owner of the 161-foot schooner Goodwill, to enter it in the Transpacific Yacht Race from Los Angeles to Honolulu. The conversion of the recreational yacht to a racer included the creation of twin 72-foot aluminum spinnaker poles at Douglas Aircraft Company. They were so long that Jim Douglas created pole ends that could be severed by means of explosive bolts from fighter jet ejector seats to drop the sail in an emergency. The crew numbered 47, including 30 sailors, a cook and seven stewards. The Douglas brothers had major roles in crew leadership, and Don served as the Sailing Master in the 1959 race. The Goodwill was the first to finish the 1953 race, as well as in 1959.

He appeared on Groucho Marx television program "You Bet Your Life" on September 29, 1955. Mr. Douglas donated his winnings to the Boy Scouts of America.

In 1974, he founded the Douglas Museum and Library at the south side of the Santa Monica Airport. After his discussions with entrepreneur David G. Price, the museum was moved to the north side of the airport, and reopened as Museum of Flying in 1989.

He served on the board of directors of Hilton Hotels, and was a member of the Rancheros Visitadores, an equestrian club based in Santa Barbara, California.

Business positions
Preceded by Donald Wills Douglas Sr.	President of Douglas Aircraft Company; 1957–1967	Succeeded by (None)
