= Archibald Stuart-MacLaren =

Archibald Stuart Charles Stuart-MacLaren was an early British aviator who led the British attempt to win the race between nations to make the first aerial circumnavigation of the globe in 1924.

Stuart-MacLaren received his Aviator’s Certificate (No. 1310) from The Royal Aero Club of the United Kingdom on 4 June 1915. He received training in a Caudron biplane at the British Flying School, Le Crotoy, France.

From December 1918 to January 1919, then Major Stuart-MacLaren was 2nd air mechanic on a flight from Suffolk, England, to Karachi, India, in a Handley Page V/1500 heavy bomber, registration J1936, HMA Old Carthusian, the aircraft later used to bomb the royal palace of Amanullah Khan in Kabul, a mission thought to have precipitated the end of the Third Anglo-Afghan War. –

== First aerial circumnavigation attempt of 1924 ==
On 25 March 1924, Squadron Leader Stuart-MacLaren, and his team of two other fliers, William Noble Plenderleith and flight engineer Sergeant W. H. Andrews flew on a Vickers Vulture II Mark VI amphibious biplane G-EBHO. Their group became the first of six teams to attempt the first aerial circumnavigation, departing from the Calshot Aerodrome, near Southampton, at 12:09 p.m. toward Lyon in France. From April to July of that year, teams from the U.S., Portugal, France, Italy and Argentina, in that order, set off in concurrent attempts to secure the honour but only the Americans were to succeed in completing the journey. After a mishap-fraught journey in which their engine was twice replaced, the airframe was destroyed on take-off at Akyab Island, Burma.

The American competing flight, then in Tokyo progressing well in its attempt to be first to circumnavigate, learned of the disaster on 25 May, receiving a telegram stating "MacLaren crashed at Akyab. Plane completely wrecked. Continuance of flight doubtful." They responded by arranging delivery of a spare plane from Tokyo to Akyab on the USS John Paul Jones, transshipped in Hong Kong onto the USS William B Preston. MacLaren received the plane (registered G-EBGO) at Akyab on 11 June and they were able to resume, thanks entirely to the Americans, on 24 June. At 1712 on 30 June, they reached Hong Kong.

The attempt came to an end on 4 August 1924, at the Commander Islands in the Bering Sea, when heavy fog forced pilot Plenderleith to make a forced sea landing in which the aircraft was badly damaged. They managed to beach at Nikolskoye on Bering Island where they were rescued by HMCS Thiepval.

Stuart-MacLaren was married and had two children.
