= Douglas World Cruiser =

Aircraft developed to fly around the world

World Cruiser
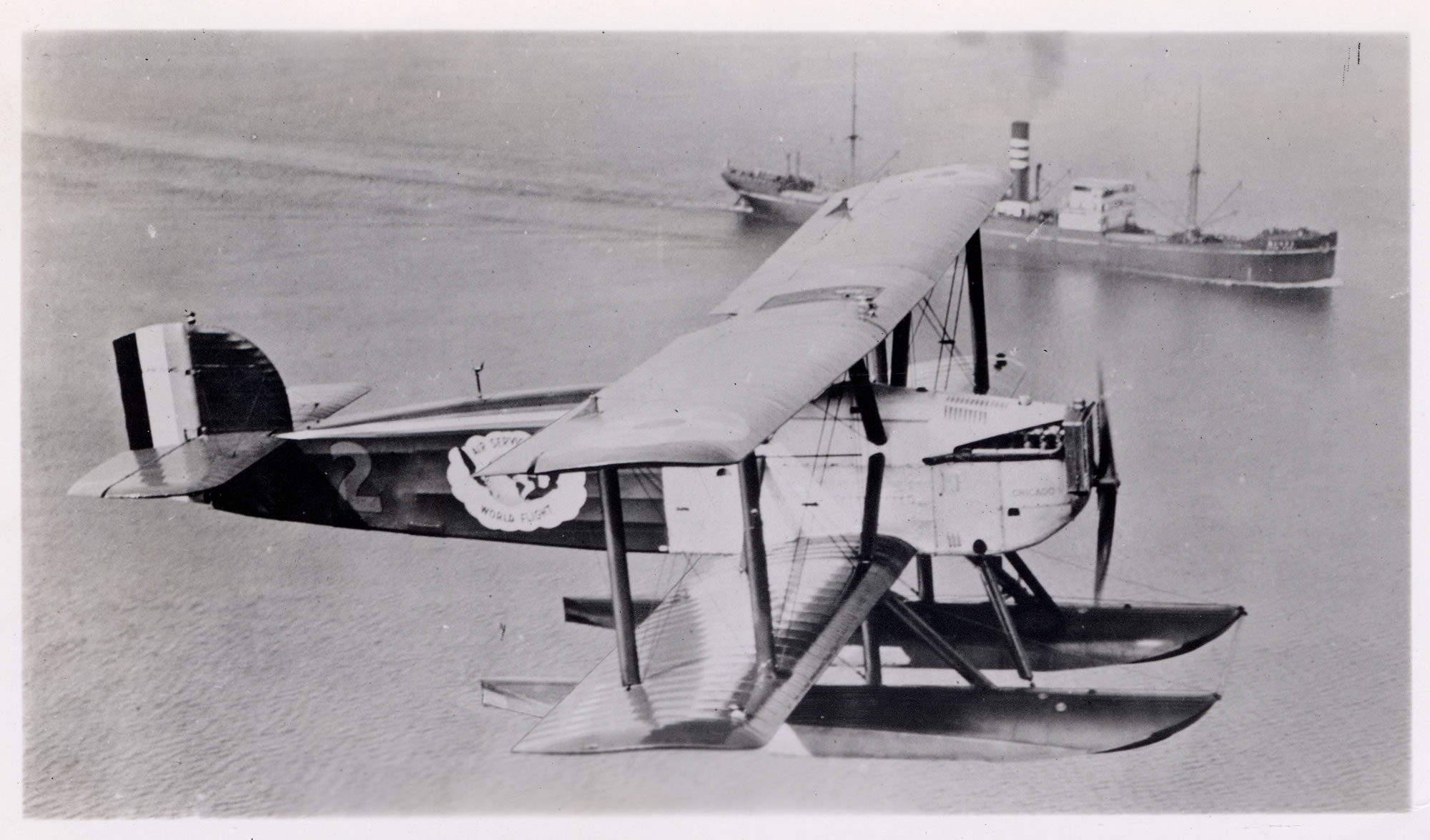
- Douglas World Cruiser Chicago (23-1230) equipped with floats

General information
- Type: Seaplane
- Manufacturer: Douglas Aircraft Company
- Designer: Donald Douglas
- Primary user: U.S. Army Air Service
- Number built: 5

History
- First flight: November 1923
- Developed from: Douglas DT

The Douglas World Cruiser (DWC) was developed to meet a requirement from the United States Army Air Service for an aircraft suitable for an attempt at the first flight around the world. The Douglas Aircraft Company responded with a modified variant of their DT torpedo bomber, the DWC.

Five aircraft were ordered for the round-the-world flight: one for testing and training and four for the actual expedition. The success of the World Cruiser bolstered the international reputation of the Douglas Aircraft Company. The design of the DWC was later modified to create the O-5 observation aircraft, which was operated by the Army Air Service.

== Design and development ==
In 1923, the U.S. Army Air Service was interested in pursuing a mission to be the first to circumnavigate the Earth by aircraft, a program called "World Flight". Donald Douglas proposed a modified Douglas Aircraft Company DT to meet the Army's needs. The two-place, open cockpit DT biplane torpedo bomber had previously been supplied to the Navy, thus shortening production time for the new series. The DTs to be modified were taken from the assembly lines at the company's manufacturing plants in Rock Island, Illinois, and Dayton, Ohio. Douglas promised that the design could be completed within 45 days after receiving a contract. The Air Service agreed and lent Lieutenant Erik Nelson, a member of the War Department planning group, to assist Douglas. Nelson worked directly with Douglas at the Santa Monica, California, factory, to formulate the new proposal.

The modified aircraft known as the Douglas World Cruiser (DWC), powered by a 420 hp Liberty L-12 engine, also was the first major project at Douglas for Jack Northrop. Northrop designed the fuel system for the series. The conversion involved incorporating a total of six fuel tanks in wings and fuselage. For greater range, the total fuel capacity went from 115 to 644 U.S. gallons (440 to 2,440 liters). Other changes from the DT involved having increased cooling capacity, as well as adding two separate tanks for oil and water. To ensure a more robust structure, a tubular steel fuselage, strengthened bracing, a modified wing of 49 ft (15 m) wingspan and larger rudder were required. The dual cockpits for the pilot and copilot/crewman (Note: For the record flight, pilots were matched with a copilot who could also act as a mechanic, or a flight engineer. "Everybody was a mechanic and everybody was a flier.") were also located more closely together with a cutout in the upper wing to increase visibility.

Like the DT, the DWC could be fitted with either floats or a conventional landing gear for water or ground landings. Two different radiators were available, with a larger version for tropical climes. After the prototype was delivered in November 1923, upon the successful completion of tests on 19 November, the Army commissioned Douglas to build four production series aircraft. Due to the demanding expedition ahead, spare parts, including 15 extra Liberty engines, 14 extra sets of pontoons, and enough replacement airframe parts for two more aircraft were specified and sent to way points along the route. The last aircraft was delivered on 11 March 1924.

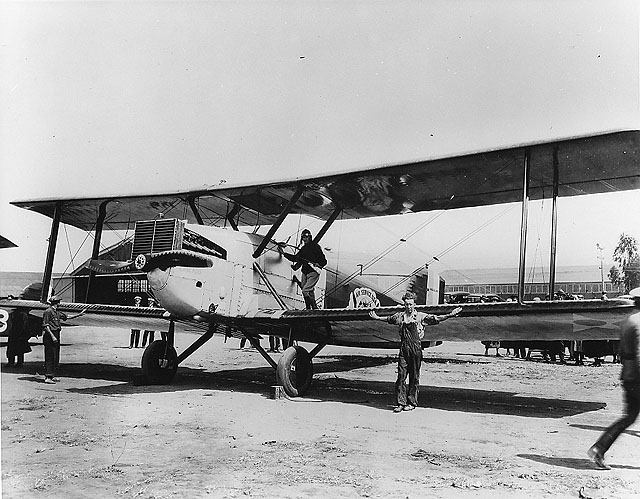
Chicago, 1924

== Operational history ==
From 17 March 1924, the pilots practiced in the prototype which served as a training aircraft. On 6 April 1924, the four expedition aircraft, named Boston, Chicago, New Orleans and Seattle, (Note: The aircraft names were chosen to represent "the four corners of the United States.") departed Sand Point, Washington, near Seattle, Washington. (Note: The individual aircraft were formally christened with waters from their namesake cities, prior to departure from Seattle where Boeing Company mechanics configured the aircraft for the long over-water portion of the flight, by exchanging wheels for pontoon floats, an operation that was repeated many times during the flight.) Seattle, the lead aircraft, crashed in Alaska on 30 April. The other three aircraft with Chicago assuming the lead, continued west across Asia and Europe relying on a carefully planned logistics system, including prepositioned spare engines and fuel caches maintained by the U.S. Navy and Coast Guard, to keep the aircraft flying. Boston was forced down and damaged beyond repair in the Atlantic, off the Faroe Islands. The remaining two aircraft continued across the Atlantic to North America, where they were joined by Boston II at Pictou, Nova Scotia. The recently re-christened prototype continued with the flight back to Washington and on the World Flight's ceremonial flypast across the United States. The three surviving aircraft returned to Seattle on 28 September 1924. The flight covered 23,942 nmi (44,341 km). Time in flight was 371 hours, 11 minutes and average speed, 70 miles per hour.

== Manufacturer ==
Douglas Aircraft Company's logo was later changed in commemoration of the first aerial circumnavigation.

After the success of the World Cruiser, the Army Air Service ordered six similar aircraft as observation aircraft, retaining the interchangeable wheel/float undercarriage, but with much less fuel and two machine guns on a flexible mounting in the rear cockpit. These aircraft were initially designated DOS (Douglas Observation Seaplane), but were redesignated O-5 in May 1924.

The success of the DWC established Douglas Aircraft Company among the major aircraft companies of the world and led it to adopt the motto "First Around the World – First the World Around". The company also adopted a logo that showed aircraft circling a globe, replacing the original winged heart logo. (Note: The Douglas logo evolved into an aircraft, a missile, and a globe and was adopted by the McDonnell Douglas Corporation following the merger of Douglas and the McDonnell Aircraft Corporation in 1967, and then became the basis of the logo of the Boeing Company following its acquisition of McDonnell Douglas in 1997.)

== Surviving aircraft ==
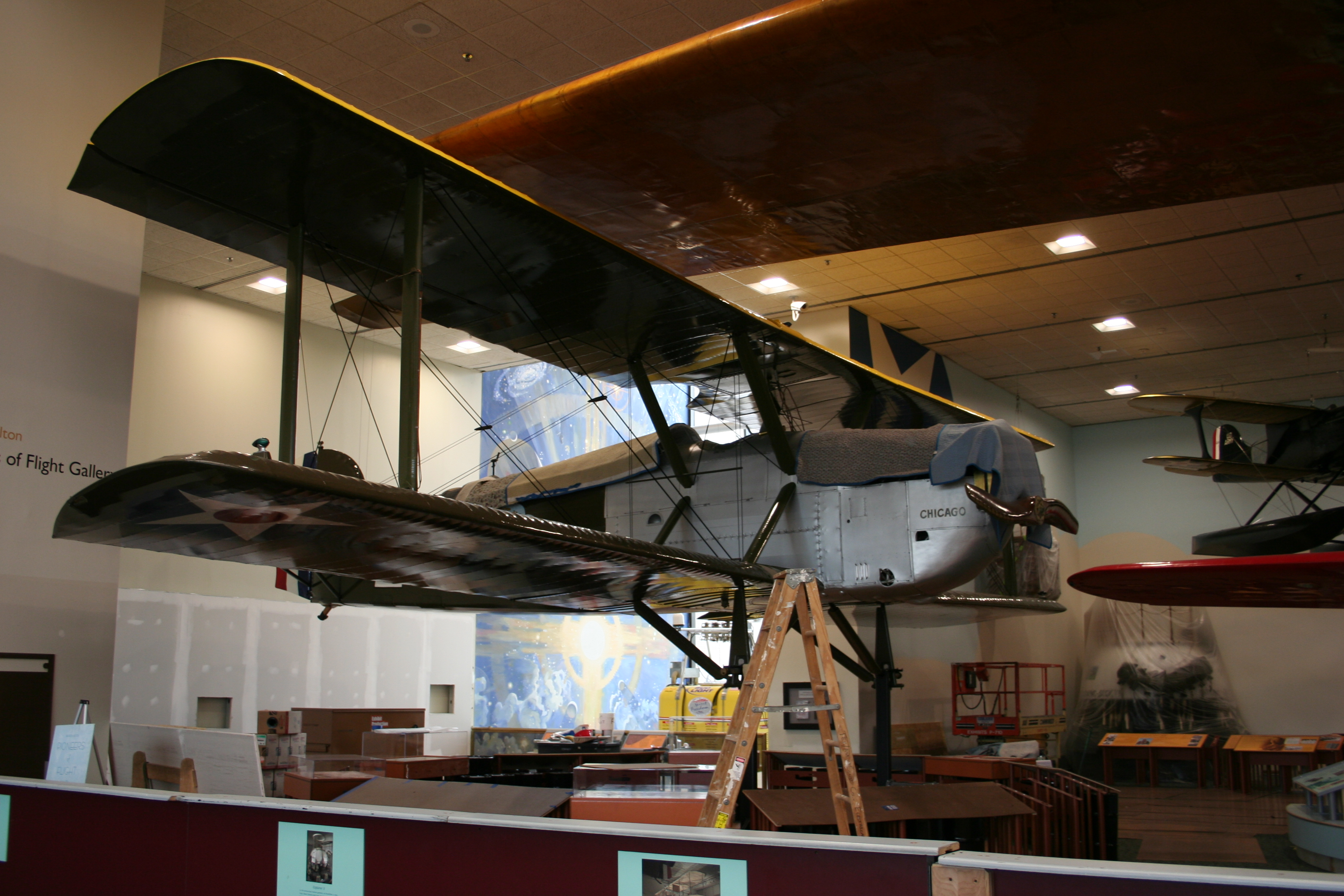
The Chicago undergoing restoration while at the National Air and Space Museum

In returning to their starting point, during the ceremonial flight across the United States, when the aircraft made it to Chicago for a celebration attended by thousands, Lieutenant Smith, as the spokesman for the mission, addressed the crowd. Eddie Rickenbacker, the celebrated flying ace and chair of the welcoming committee, formally requested that the Chicago, as the mission flagship, remain in its host city, donated to the Field Museum of Natural History. Major General Mason M. Patrick, Chief of the Air Service, was on hand to accept the request, and promised its formal consideration.

Upon the request of the Smithsonian Institution, however, the U.S. War Department transferred ownership of the Chicago to the national museum. It made its last flight, from Dayton, Ohio, to Washington, D.C., on 25 September 1925. It was almost immediately put on display in the Smithsonian's Arts and Industries Building. In 1974, the Chicago was restored under the direction of Walter Roderick, and transferred to the new National Air and Space Museum building for display in their Barron Hilton Pioneers of Flight exhibition gallery.

The New Orleans being installed at the Museum of Flying, 2012.

After 1925, the New Orleans was donated to the Los Angeles County Museum of Natural History. Beginning in 1957, the New Orleans was displayed at the National Museum of the United States Air Force in Dayton, Ohio. In 1988, it was transferred to the Museum of Flying, Santa Monica. The aircraft was on loan from the Los Angeles County Museum of Natural History and was returned in 2005. Since February 2012, the New Orleans is to be a part of the exhibits at the Museum of Flying, Santa Monica, California.

The wreckage of the Seattle was recovered and is now on display in the Alaska Aviation Museum. The original Boston sank in the North Atlantic, and it is thought that the only surviving piece of the original prototype, the Boston II, is the aircraft data plate, now in a private collection, and a scrap of fuselage skin, in the collection of the Vintage Wings & Wheels Museum in Poplar Grove, Illinois.

=== Reproduction aircraft ===
Bob Dempster of Seattle, Washington, built an airworthy reproduction Douglas World Cruiser, the Seattle II, powered by a restored Liberty engine, which made its maiden flight on 29 June 2016. Updates available on the Seattle World Cruiser Website.

== Operator ==
United States

- United States Army Air Service

== Specifications (DWC and DOS with wheels/floats) ==
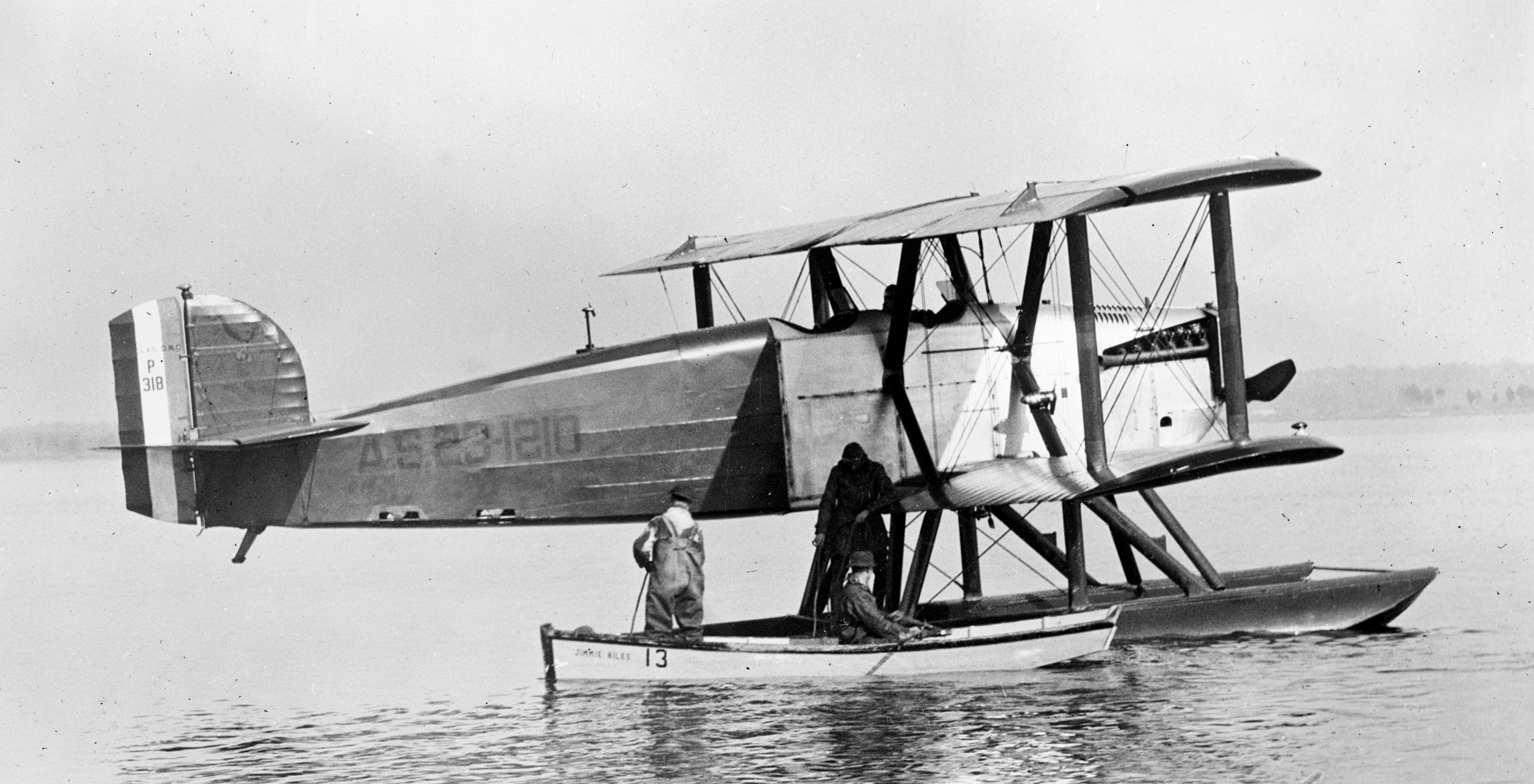
The prototype Douglas World Cruiser seaplane (s/n 23-1210). It was substituted for DWC Boston (23–1231) late on in the round-the-world trip. "P318" on the tail is the Wright Field test number. (circa 1924)

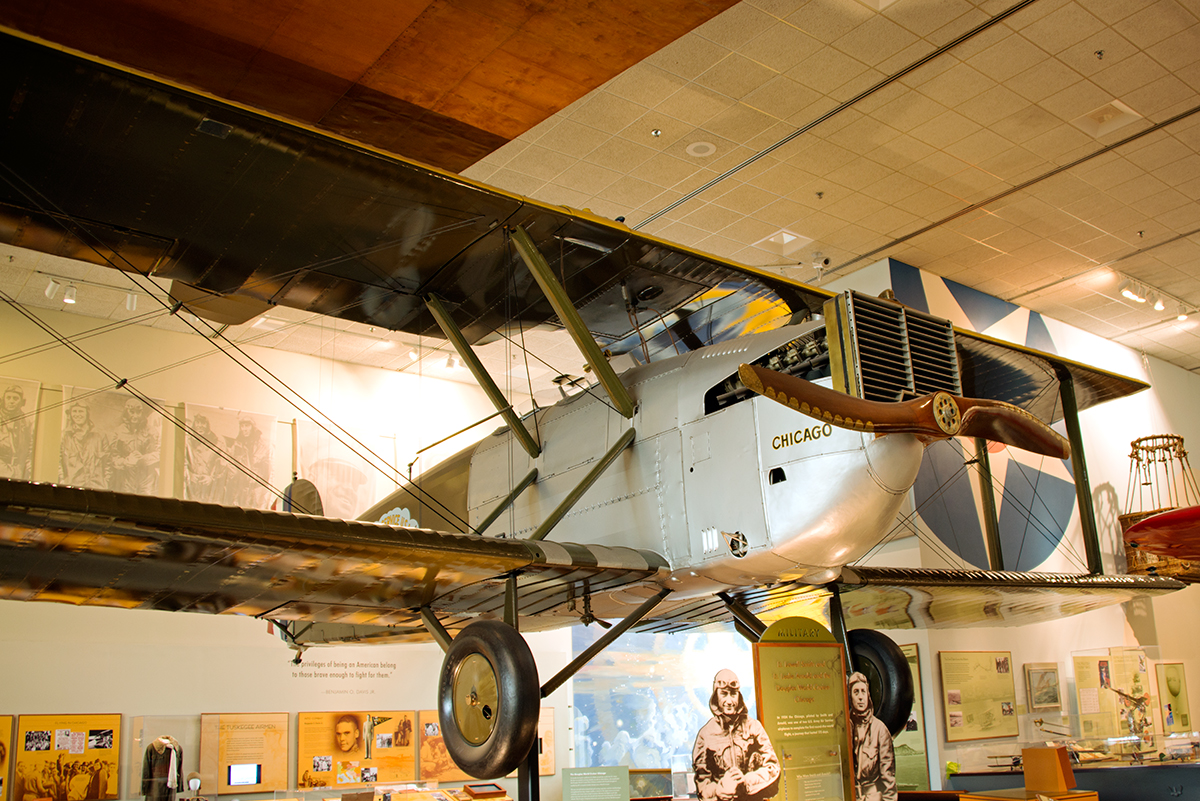
Douglas World Cruiser Chicago at the Barron Hilton Pioneers of Flight Gallery at the National Air and Space Museum, Washington, D.C.

McDonnell Douglas aircraft since 1920 : Volume I

Data from McDonnell Douglas aircraft since 1920 : Volume I

General characteristics

- Crew: 2
- Length: 35 ft 6 in (10.82 m) (landplane)

39 ft (12 m) (floatplane)

- Wingspan: 50 ft 0 in (15.24 m)
- Height: 13 ft 7 in (4.14 m) (landplane)

15 ft 1 in (4.60 m) (floatplane)

- Wing area: 707 sq ft (65.7 m^{2})
- Airfoil: USA 27
- Empty weight: 4,380 lb (1,987 kg) (landplane)

5,180 lb (2,350 kg) (floatplane)

- Gross weight: 6,995 lb (3,173 kg) (landplane)

7,795 lb (3,536 kg) (floatplane)

- Fuel capacity: 644 US gal (536 imp gal; 2,440 L) in 6 tanks; DOS 110 US gal (92 imp gal; 420 L)
- Powerplant: 1 × Liberty L-12 V-12 water-cooled piston engine, 420 hp (310 kW)
- Propellers: 2-bladed fixed-pitch wooden propellers

Performance

- Maximum speed: 103 mph (166 km/h, 90 kn) at sea level (landplane)

100 mph (87 kn; 160 km/h) (floatplane)

- Ferry range: 2,200 mi (3,500 km, 1,900 nmi) (landplane)

1,650 mi (1,430 nmi; 2,660 km) (floatplane)

- Service ceiling: 10,000 ft (3,000 m) (landplane)

7,700 ft (2,300 m) (floatplane)

- Wing loading: 9.9 lb/sq ft (48 kg/m^{2}) (landplane)

11 lb/sq ft (54 kg/m^{2}) (floatplane)

- Power/mass: 0.06 hp/lb (0.099 kW/kg) (landplane)

0.054 hp/lb (0.089 kW/kg) (floatplane)

Armament

- Guns: DOS 2x 0.3 in (7.6 mm) machine-guns on a flexible mount in the rear cockpit

== See also ==
Related development

- Douglas DT

Aircraft of comparable role, configuration, and era

- Davis-Douglas Cloudster
- Fokker T.2
