= Douglas Park (Santa Monica) =

Park in Santa Monica, California, United States

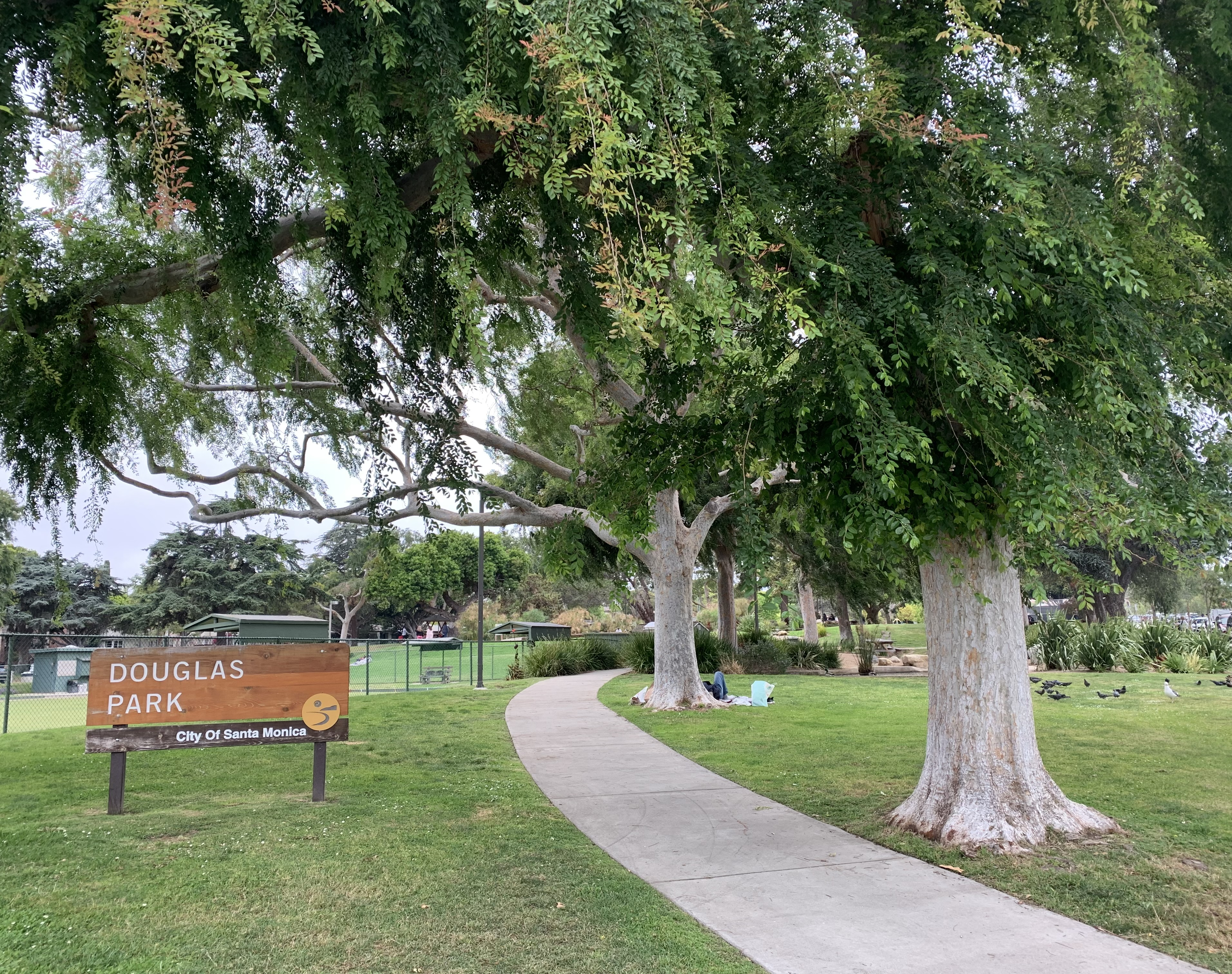
- Interactive map of Douglas Park
- Location: 2439 Wilshire Boulevard
- Nearest city: Santa Monica, California
- Coordinates: 34.03569°N 118.47930°W
- Area: 10.7 acres (4.3 ha)
- Created: 1933
- Designer: Ed Howard
- Operator: Santa Monica Community Services Department

Douglas Park is a 10.7 acres (4.3 ha) park in Santa Monica, California. Formerly the site of an aircraft factory and movie studio lot, the park is named after Donald Douglas and hosts a number of facilities, including a bowling green and Los Angeles County's largest municipal pond.

== History ==
Prior to construction, the site had been used as an aircraft factory for the Douglas Aircraft Company and a movie studio lot. However, the size of the surrounding trees limited the size of planes that could depart from the factory and made it difficult for pilots to take off from the factory, requiring some planes to be wheeled through the streets of Santa Monica. Thus, in 1927, the factory was relocated to Clover Field, now known as the Santa Monica Airport.

Following the closure of the factory, Santa Monica elected to transform the land into a park. Ed Howard was selected as the architect. Construction on the park began in 1931 and was completed in 1933. The park was originally named Padre Park before being renamed to acknowledge Donald Douglas, the founder of the Douglas Aircraft Company.

== Facilities ==
The park hosts a number of facilities including two tennis courts, picnic tables, a playground, a clubhouse, three reflecting pools, and a lawn bowling green. The park's bowling greens are particularly popular and host the Santa Monica Bowls Club. The park's man-made waterscape is also the largest municipal pond in Los Angeles County and hosts a variety of ducks, turtles, and fish.
