= Douglas DC-8 (piston airliner) =

Proposed airliner project

DC-8

General information
- Type: Airliner
- Manufacturer: Douglas Aircraft
- Status: Project canceled

History
- Developed from: Douglas XB-42 Mixmaster

The Douglas DC-8 was an American piston-engined airliner project by Douglas Aircraft. A concept developed more than a decade before the DC-8 jetliner, the piston-engined DC-8 was to have propellers in the tail, an idea first used at Douglas by Edward F. Burton on a fighter project. The airliner project was canceled after development costs made it commercially unviable.

== Design and development ==
Based on the cancelled XB-42, the program began shortly after the end of World War II. It was intended to operate on short- and medium-range routes, carrying between 40 and 48 passengers in a then-novel pressurized cabin (which had been pioneered by the Boeing 307 in 1938, but was still not in standard airline use).

The DC-8 was to use the same Allison V1710s as the XB-42 (these rated at 1,375 hp (1,025 kW)), fitted below and immediately behind the cockpit. They were to power contra-rotating propellers in the tail, as in the XB-42, by way of driveshafts under the cabin floor (an arrangement reminiscent of the P-39). This arrangement, also proposed for the Douglas Cloudster II general aviation aircraft, reduced drag by 30% and eliminated the problems associated with controlling the aircraft with one engine out. Cabin access would have been by airport stair through a single portside door.

Despite performance predicted to significantly surpass conventional twin airliners, excessive complexity and high development costs (with consequent high sales price and operating costs) meant that less risky types, such as Convair's 240 and Martin's 2-0-2, were preferred, and the DC-8 was dropped before a prototype was built.

== Specifications (estimated) ==
Data from DC-8 that might have been

General characteristics

- Crew: three
- Capacity: 40-48 passengers
- Length: 77 ft 8 in (23.67 m)
- Wingspan: 110 ft 2 in (33.58 m)
- Height: 26 ft 9 3/4 in (8.17 m)
- Wing area: 1,104 sq ft (102.6 m^{2})
- Aspect ratio: 11:1
- Airfoil: Douglas S-17
- Empty weight: 24,415 lb (11,074 kg)
- Gross weight: 40,000 lb (18,144 kg)
- Powerplant: 2 × Allison V-1710-G4L/R liquid-cooled V12 engine, 1,600 hp (1,200 kW) each (take-off power)

Performance

- Maximum speed: 280 mph (450 km/h, 240 kn) at 20,200 ft (6,200 m))
- Cruise speed: 237 mph (381 km/h, 206 kn) at 10,000 ft (3,050 m) - 60% power
- Range: 2,370 mi (3,810 km, 2,060 nmi)
- Service ceiling: 30,500 ft (9,300 m)
- Rate of climb: 940 ft/min (4.8 m/s)

== See also ==
- Pusher configuration

Related development

- XB-42 Mixmaster
- XB-43 Jetmaster

== Bibliography ==
Notes

References

- Francillon, René J. (1979). McDonnell Douglas aircraft since 1920 (1979 ed.). Naval Institute Press. ISBN 0-370-00050-1. - Total pages: 721
- Morgan, Eric B. (February 1972). "DC-8 that might have been". Air Pictorial. Vol. 34, no. 2. pp. 54–55.
