= Cloudster =

The term Cloudster can refer to a number of different aircraft types:

- Douglas Cloudster, open-cockpit biplane
- Douglas Cloudster II, pusher monoplane
- Pop's Props Cloudster, parasol-wing monoplane
- Rearwin Cloudster, high-wing monoplane
- Ryson ST-100 Cloudster, low-wing monoplane
- Simplex Aeroplanes Cloudster, open-cockpit monoplane

== See also ==
- Cloudstar, a fictional character from the Warriors novel series by Erin Hunter
- Ryan Cloudster (disambiguation)
- Cloud (disambiguation)
