= Ryan Cloudster =

Ryan Cloudster may refer to:

- Douglas Cloudster, a 1920s American biplane aircraft
- Ryan ST-100 Cloudster, a 1980s American motor glider

== See also ==
- Search for "Ryan" and "Cloudster"
- Cloudster (disambiguation)
- Ryan (disambiguation)
