= B43 =

B43 may refer to:

- Bundesstraße 43, a German road
- B43 (New York City bus) in Brooklyn
- B43 nuclear bomb
- B43, an anti-CD19 antibody
- B-43 Jetmaster, an aircraft
