= Allison V-1710 =

Aircraft engine produced and manufactured by Allison Engine Company

V-1710
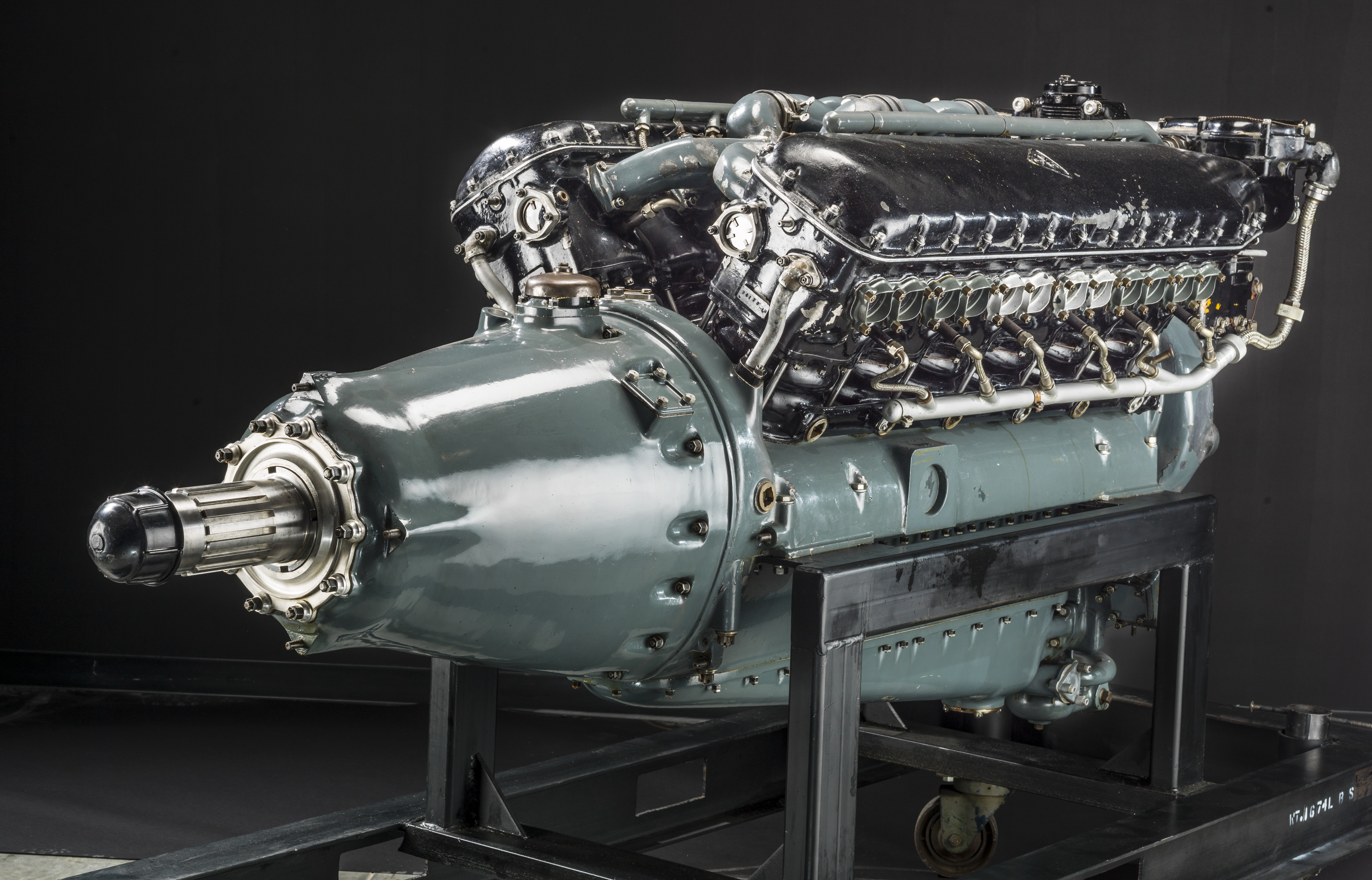
- An early Allison V-1710 engine (V-1710-7)
- Type: Liquid-cooled V12 piston engine
- Manufacturer: Allison Engine Company
- First run: 1930
- Major applications: Bell P-39 Airacobra; Curtiss P-40 Warhawk; Lockheed P-38 Lightning; North American P-51 Mustang; North American F-82 Twin Mustang
- Number built: 69,305
- Developed into: Allison V-3420

The Allison V-1710 was an American V12 aircraft engine designed and produced by the Allison Engine Company. Liquid-cooled, it was the most common US-developed engine of its type in service during World War II. Versions equipped with turbochargers (called "turbo-superchargers" at the time) gave excellent performance at high altitude in the twin-engined Lockheed P-38 Lightning, and turbochargers were also fitted to experimental single-engined fighters with similar results.

The United States Army Air Corps (USAAC) preference for turbochargers early in the V-1710's development program meant that less effort was spent on developing suitable mechanically driven centrifugal superchargers for the Allison V12 design, as other V12 designs from friendly nations like the British Rolls-Royce Merlin were already using.

When smaller-dimensioned or lower-cost versions of the V-1710 were desired, they generally had poor performance at higher altitudes.

== Design and development ==
The Allison Division of General Motors began developing an ethylene glycol-cooled engine in 1929 to meet a USAAC need for a modern, 1,000 hp (750 kW), engine to fit into a new generation of streamlined bombers and fighters. To ease production, the new design could be equipped with different propeller gearing systems and superchargers, allowing a single production line to build engines for various fighters and bombers.

The United States Navy (USN) hoped to use the V-1710 in its rigid airships Akron and Macon, but both were equipped with German-built Maybach VL II engines as the V-1710 was still in testing when the Macon was lost in February 1935 (the Akron having been lost in April 1933). The USAAC purchased its first V-1710 in December 1932. The Great Depression slowed development, and it was not until December 14, 1936, that the engine next flew in the Consolidated XA-11A testbed. The V-1710-C6 successfully completed the USAAC 150 hour Type Test on April 23, 1937, at 1,000 hp (750 kW), the first engine of any type to do so. The engine was then offered to aircraft manufacturers, where it powered the prototype Curtiss XP-37s. All entrants in the new pursuit competition were designed around it, powering the Lockheed P-38, Bell P-39 and Curtiss P-40. When war material procurement agents from the United Kingdom asked North American Aviation to build the P-40 under license, NAA instead proposed their own improved aircraft design, using the V-1710 in their NA-u73, which became the first generation of the famed P-51 Mustang.

== Technical description ==
The V-1710 has 12 cylinders with a bore and stroke of 5.5 by 6 in (139.7 by 152.4 mm) in 60° V format, for a displacement of 1,710.6 cu in (28.032 L), with a compression ratio of 6.65:1. The valvetrain has a single overhead camshaft per bank of cylinders and four valves per cylinder.

=== Flexibility and reversibility of rotation ===
The engine design benefited from General Motors’ adoption of modular design that provided built-in aviation powerplant production and installation versatility. The engine was constructed around a long block, which could meet various design requirements by fitting the appropriate accessories section at the rear, and an appropriate power output drive at the front. A turbocharger could be used, if desired.

The P-39, P-63, and experimental Douglas XB-42 used V-1710-Es, exchanging the integral reduction gear for an extension shaft driving a remotely located reduction gear and propeller. Aircraft such as the P-38, P-40, P-51A, and North American P-82E used close-coupled propeller reduction gears, a feature of the V-1710-F series.

The accessory end had a one- or two-speed engine-driven supercharger that might have a second stage with or without an intercooler, the ignition magnetos and the customary assortment of oil and fuel pumps, all dictated by the application requirements. The front of the engine could have one of a number of different output drives. The drive might be a "long-nose" or close coupled propeller reduction gear, an extension drive to a remote gearbox, or a gearbox that could drive two wing-mounted propellers from a fuselage-mounted engine.

Another key feature of the V-1710 design was its ability to turn the output shaft clockwise or counter-clockwise by assembling the engine with the crankshaft turned end-for-end, by installing an idler gear in the drive train to the supercharger, camshafts, and accessories, installing a starter turning the proper direction, and re-arranging the ignition wiring on the right side to accommodate a changed firing order. No change to the oil pump nor coolant pump circuits was needed. The ability to reverse the direction of rotation with a minimum of extra parts allowed the use of either a "tractor" or "pusher" propeller. This approach allowed easy changes of the supercharger(s) and supercharger drive-gear ratio. That gave different critical altitude (the maximum altitude at which the engine could produce full power) ratings ranging from 8,000 to 26,000 feet (2,400 to 7,900 m).

=== Supercharger ===
The V-1710 has often been criticized for not having a "high-altitude" supercharger. The comparison is usually to the later, two-stage, versions of the Rolls-Royce Merlin 60-series engines also built by Packard as the V-1650 and used in the P-51B Mustang and subsequent variants. The USAAC had specified that the V-1710 was to be a single-stage supercharged engine and, if a higher altitude capability was desired, the aircraft could use their newly developed turbocharger as was featured in the XP-37(YP-37), P-38, and XP-39.

The benefits of a two-stage supercharger eventually became so clear that Allison did make some efforts in this direction. Allison attached an auxiliary supercharger in various configurations to the existing engine-mounted supercharger and carburetor. Early versions of these two-stage supercharger engines were used on the P-63. No intercooler, aftercooler, or backfire screen (flame trap) were incorporated into these two-stage V-1710 engines (except for the V-1710-119 used on the experimental P-51J, which had an aftercooler and Flame Traps). The two-stage Merlin engines had all of these features, which were designed to prevent detonation from charge heating and backfire into the supercharger. The G-series V-1710s installed on the F-82 E/F/G models had only anti-detonation injection (ADI) to deal with these problems, and not surprisingly had severe reliability and maintenance problems. In one record, it was stated that the F-82 required 33 hours of maintenance for each hour of flight.

Although the early V-1710 powered P-39, P-40 and P-51A were limited to combat operations at a maximum of about 15,000 feet (4,600 m) they were available in comparatively large numbers and were the mainstay of some Allied Air Forces in all but the European theater of war. The engines proved to be robust and little affected by machine-gun fire. In total, over 60 percent of the post-June 1941 USAAF's pursuit aircraft operated during WWII were powered by the V-1710.

Allison slowly but continuously improved the engine during the war. The initial rating of 1,000 hp (750 kW) was incrementally increased. By 1944, the War Emergency Power rating on the P-38L was 1,600 hp (1,200 kW). The final V-1710-143/145(G6R/L) was rated for 2,300 hp (1,700 kW).

The most powerful factory variant was the V-1710-127, designed to produce 2,320 hp (1,730 kW) dry at low altitude and 2,800–2,920 hp (2,090–2,180 kW) at 33,000 feet (10,000 m). This engine was static tested at 3,090 hp (2,300 kW) wet War Emergency Power and was planned for installation in an XP-63H aircraft. The end of the war ended this development, so this promising experiment never flew. The extra power of this version was derived from using exhaust turbines to drive the crankshaft, called a turbo-compound engine.

Improvements in manufacturing brought the cost to produce each engine from $25,000 down to $8,500 and allowed the installed lifetime of the engine to be increased from 300 hours to as much as 1,000 hours for the less-stressed power-plants. Weight increases needed to accomplish this were minimal, with the result that all models were able to produce more than 1 hp/lb (1.6 kW/kg) at their takeoff rating.

There was also a high degree of commonality of parts throughout the series. The individual parts of the Allison series were produced to a high degree of standardization and reliability, using the best technology available at the time. Even after the war, racing Merlins used Allison connecting rods. As stated previously, General Motors' policies regarding versatility meant that their Allison division would also employ modular design features on the V-1710 from its "long block" core V12 unit outwards, so that it was capable of being mated to many different styles of turbochargers and various other accessories, although the variety of turbochargers available for installation was limited due to the constraints of single-engine fighter design. Since it was produced in large numbers and was highly standardized, the engine has been used in many postwar racing designs. Its reliability and well-mannered operation allowed it to operate at high rpm for extended periods.

Following the war, North American built 250 P-82E/F for air defense roles into the early 1950s. This was the final military role for the V-1710.

=== Turbocharger ===
The USAAC had earlier decided to concentrate on turbochargers for high altitude boost, believing that further development of turbochargers would allow their engines to outperform European rivals using crankshaft driven superchargers. Turbochargers are powered by the engine exhaust and so do not draw much power from the engine crankshaft, whereas displacement superchargers are coupled directly by shafts and gears to the engine crankshaft. Turbochargers do increase the exhaust back-pressure and thus do cause a small decrease in engine power, but the power increase due to increased induction pressures more than makes up for that decrease. Crankshaft-driven superchargers require an increase in directly driven percentage of engine power as altitude increases (the two-stage supercharger of the Merlin 60 series engines consumed some 330–380 hp (250–280 kW) at 25,000 ft (7,600 m). General Electric was the sole source for research and production of American turbochargers during this period, from its four decades worth of steam turbine engineering experience.

Turbochargers were highly successful in U.S. bombers, which were exclusively powered by radial engines. The P-47 Thunderbolt fighter had the same combination of radial engine (R-2800) and turbocharger and was also successful, apart from its large bulk, which was caused by the need for the ductwork for the aft-mounted turbocharger.

However, mating the turbocharger with the Allison V-1710 proved to be problematic. As a result, designers of the fighter planes that used the V-1710 were invariably forced to choose between the poor high-altitude performance of the V-1710 versus the increased problems brought on by addition of the turbocharger. The fates of all of the V-1710 powered fighters of World War II would thus hinge on that choice.

The original XP-39 was built with a V-1710 augmented by a General Electric Type B-5 turbocharger as specified by Fighter Projects Officer Lieutenant Benjamin S. Kelsey and his colleague Gordon P. Saville. Numerous changes were made to the design during a period of time when Kelsey's attention was focused elsewhere, and Bell engineers, NACA aero-dynamic specialists and the substitute fighter project officer determined that dropping the turbocharger would be among the drag reduction measures indicated by borderline wind tunnel test results; an unnecessary step, according to aviation engineer and historian Warren M. Bodie. The production P-39 was thus stuck with poor high-altitude performance and proved unsuitable for the air war in Western Europe which was largely conducted at high altitudes. The P-39 was rejected by the British, but used by the U.S. in the Mediterranean and the early Pacific air war, as well as shipped to the Soviet Union in large numbers under the Lend Lease program. The Soviets were able to make good use of P-39s because of its excellent maneuverability and because the air war on the Eastern Front in Europe was primarily short ranged, tactical, and conducted at lower altitudes. In the P-39, Soviet pilots scored the highest number of individual kills made on any American, or British fighter type.

The P-40, which also had only the single-stage, single-speed-supercharged V-1710, had similar problems with high-altitude performance.

The P-38 was the only fighter to make it into combat during World War II with turbocharged V-1710s. The operating conditions of the Western European air war – flying for long hours in intensely cold weather at 30,000 feet (9,100 m) – revealed several problems with these engines. They had a poor manifold fuel-air distribution and poor temperature regulation of the turbocharger air, which resulted in frequent engine failures (detonation occurred as the result of persistent uneven fuel-air mixture across the cylinders caused by the poor manifold design). Specially formulated fuels were a necessity for the P-38 as were specific spark plugs needed for specific cylinders. The turbocharger had additional problems with getting stuck in the freezing air in either high or low boost mode; the high boost mode could cause detonation in the engine, while the low boost mode would be manifested as power loss in one engine, resulting in sudden fishtailing in flight. These problems were aggravated by sub-optimal engine management techniques taught to many pilots during the first part of WWII, including a cruise setting that ran the engine at high RPM and low manifold pressure with a rich mixture. These settings can contribute to over-cooling of the engine, fuel condensation problems, accelerated mechanical wear, and the likelihood of components binding or "freezing up." Details of the failure patterns were described in a report by General Doolittle to General Spatz in January 1944. In March 1944, the first Allison engines appearing over Berlin belonged to a group of P-38Hs of 55th Fighter Group, engine troubles contributing to a reduction of the force to half strength over the target. It was too late to correct these problems in the production lines of Allison or GE, and as the numbers of Merlin-engined P-51 Mustangs based in England mounted up through the end of 1943 and into 1944, the P-38s were steadily withdrawn from Europe until October 1944 when they were no longer used for bomber escort duty with the Eighth Air Force. A few P-38s would remain in the European theater as the F-5 for photo reconnaissance.

The P-38 had fewer engine failures in the Pacific Theater, where operating techniques were better developed (such as those recommended by Charles Lindbergh during his development work in the theater),) and the Japanese did not operate at such high altitudes. Using the same P-38Gs which were proving difficult to maintain in England, Pacific-based pilots were able to use the aircraft to good advantage including, in April 1943, Operation Vengeance, the interception and downing of the Japanese bomber carrying Admiral Isoroku Yamamoto. New P-38 models with ever-increasing power from more advanced Allisons were eagerly accepted by Pacific air groups.

When Packard started building Merlin V-1650 engines in America in 1942, certain American fighter designs using the Allison V-1710 were changed to use the Merlin. The P-40F, a Lend Lease export to Britain, was one of the first American fighters to be converted to a Packard-Merlin engine. However, the installed engine was the V-1650-1 (a Packard-produced Merlin XX) with a slightly improved single-stage, two-speed supercharger, yielding only modest gains over the Allison V-1710.

The last Allison powered P-51, the Mustang I(II)/P-51A, used the single-stage, single-speed Allison V-1710-81, with a 9.6:1 blower ratio. This allowed the P-51A to reach a maximum speed of 415 mph (668 km/h; 361 kn) at 10,400 ft (3,200 m) and maintain 400 mph (640 km/h; 350 kn) at 23,000 ft (7,000 m). This was more than 70 mph (110 km/h; 61 kn) faster than the Merlin 45-powered Spitfire V at 10,000 ft (3,000 m), and more than 30 mph (48 km/h; 26 kn) faster at 25,000 ft (7,600 m). Its speed impressed the British, and the RAF quickly realized the airplane would possess excellent high altitude performance if the Allison V-1710 engine were replaced by the 60-Series Merlin. A similar proposal to cure the P-38's problems by replacing its Allisons with Merlins was quashed by the USAAF, after protests from Allison.

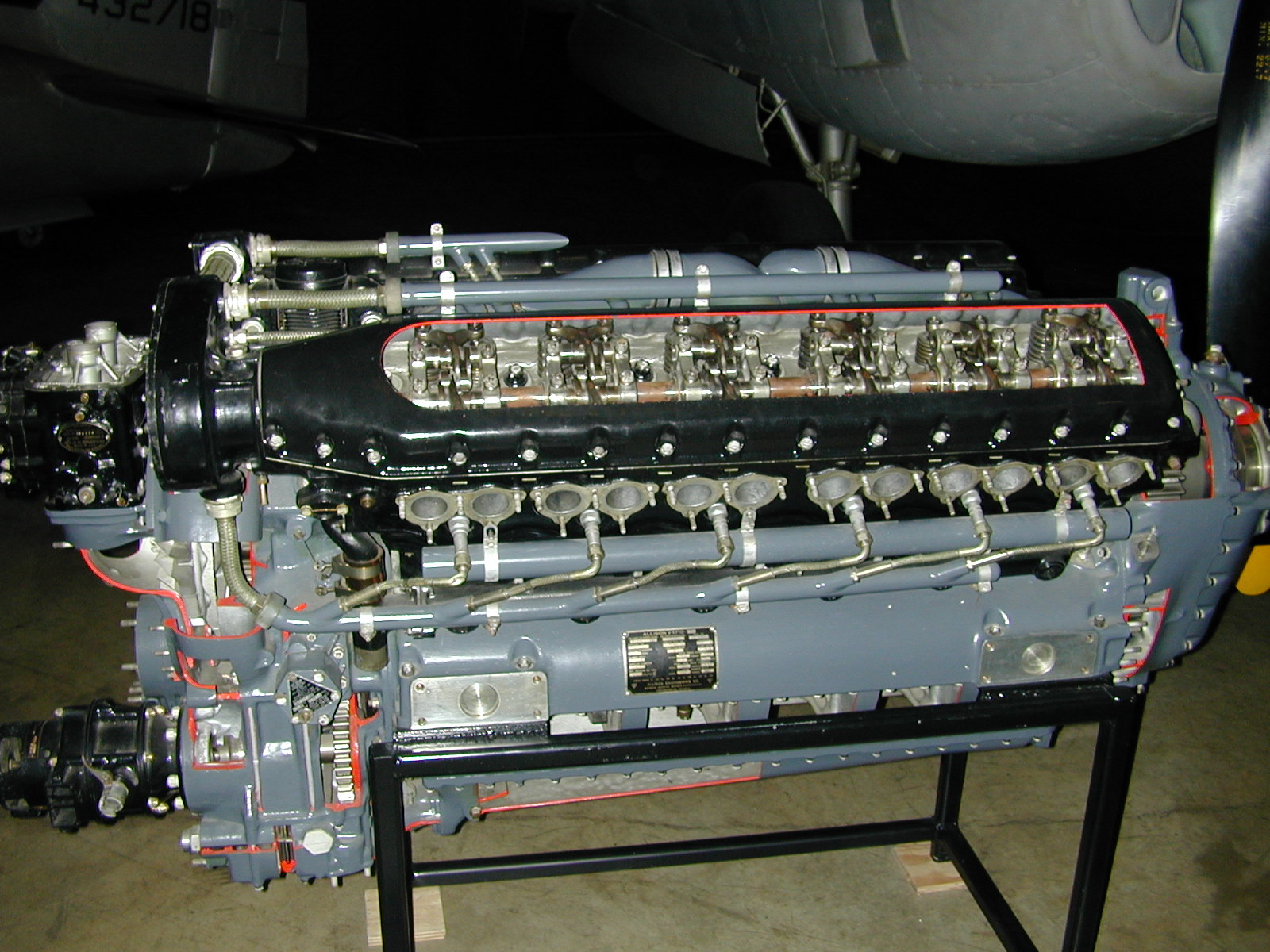
Cutaway of Allison V-1710

Starting with the V-1710-45 around 1943 (after the P-51 had been fitted with a Merlin 65 by Rolls-Royce), Allison attached an auxiliary supercharger to some of its engines in an effort to improve high-altitude performance. The two-stage supercharged Allison was essentially developed as an "add on" to the single-stage engine, and required minimal changes to the base engine. While it lacked the refinement, compactness and after-cooler of the two-stage Merlin, the Allison used a pressure-altitude governed variable-speed first stage. Various configurations of this auxiliary supercharger were used in production versions of the V-1710 that powered aircraft such as the Bell P-63 and North American P-82E/F/G series. In addition, it was tried or studied as the powerplant for many experimental and test aircraft such as the Curtiss XP-55 Ascender, North American XP-51J "lightweight Mustang", Boeing XB-38 Flying Fortress, and Republic XP-47A (AP-10), both of the latter with turbochargers.

== Post-war ==
The V-1710-powered F-82 did not arrive in time for World War II, but did see brief action in the Korean War, although the type was completely withdrawn from Korea by the end of 1950. It had a short service life that was probably due to a combination of factors: poor reliability from the G-series V-1710 engines, low numbers of F-82s produced, and the arrival of jet fighters. The initial production P-82B had Merlin engines, but North American was forced to use the Allison V-1710 for the E/F/G models when Rolls Royce required a "Royalty" of $6,500.00 per engine and the U. S. Government stopped buying the Merlin engine because of the excessive cost.

== Production total ==
In total, 69,305 V-1710s were built by Allison during the war, all in Indianapolis, Indiana.

== Other uses ==
The V-1710's useful life continued, as thousands were available on the surplus market. In the 1950s, many drag racers and land speed racers, attracted by its reliability and good power output, adopted the V-1710; Art Arfons and brother Walt in particular used one, in an early dragster version of their Green Monster. It proved unsuccessful in the 1/4 mile, being unable to accelerate rapidly, but "could taxi all day at 150". Unlimited hydroplane racing also became a big sport across the U.S. at this time and V-1710s were often tuned for racing at up to 4,000 hp (3,000 kW)—power levels that were beyond design criteria and significantly reduced durability.

Later, as purpose-built V8 engines became available for drag racing and unlimited boats shifted to turboshaft power, tractor pullers began using the Allison engine, again developing unimagined power. Finally, the warbird movement began to restore and return to the air examples of the classic fighters of the war and many V-1710-powered pursuit airplanes began to fly again, with freshly overhauled engines. The reliability, maintainability, and availability of the engine has led others to use it to power flying examples of aircraft whose original engines are unobtainable. This includes newly manufactured Russian Yak-3 and Yak-9 airplanes, originally powered by Klimov V12s in World War II and the two (so far) airworthy examples of the Ilyushin Il-2, taking the place of the Mikulin V12 it originally used, as well as ambitious projects such as a replica Douglas World Cruiser and Focke-Wulf Fw 190D by Flug Werk of Germany.

== Variants ==
Allison's internal model designation for the V-1710 started with the letter A and proceeded to the letter H. Each letter designated a family of engines that shared major components, but differed in specific design details. Each of these designs were identified by a number, starting with number 1. The last letter, which was introduced when both right hand turning and left hand turning engines were built, identified by the letter R or L respectively.

The military model numbers were identified by a "dash number" following the engine description "V-1710". The USAAC/USAAF models were the odd numbers, starting with "-1" and the USN models were the even numbers, starting with "-2".

V-1710-A

"A" series engines were early development engines for the USN and USAAC. The first military model was a single V-1710-2, which was first sold to the USN on June 26, 1930. The "A" engines had no counterweights on the crankshaft, 5.75:1 compression ratio, 2:1 internal spur gear-type reduction gear boxes, 8.77:1 supercharger gear ratio, 9.5 in (240 mm) impeller, SAE #50 propeller shaft, a float-type carburetor, and produced 1,070 hp (800 kW) at 2800 rpm on 92 octane gasoline.

V-1710-B

"B" series engines were designed for USN airships. The military model was V-1710-4. They differed from the "A" series engines in that they did not have a supercharger, had two float-type down-draft carburetors were mounted directly to the intake manifold, an SAE #40 propeller shaft, and could be brought from full power to stop and back to full power in the opposite rotation in less than 8 seconds. They produced 600–690 hp (450–510 kW) at 2400 rpm.

V-1710-C

"C" series engines were developed for highly streamlined pursuit aircraft for the USAAC, and are easily identified by the long reduction gear case. The military models were V-1710-3, -5, -7, -11. -13, -15, -19, -21, -23, -33, producing between 750–1,050 hp (560–780 kW) at 2600 rpm. These engines came in two groups, one group rated at full power at sea level, the other rated at full power at high altitude. The altitude rating difference was in the supercharger gear ratio, four of which were used: 6.23:1, 6.75:1, 8.0:1 and 8.77:1. These engines received heavier crankcases, a stronger crankshaft, SAE #50 propeller shaft, and Bendix pressure carburetors.

V-1710-D

"D" series engines were designed for pusher applications using propeller-speed extension shafts and remote thrust bearings mounted to the airframe. The military models were V-1710-9, -13, -23, and -41, producing 1,000–1,250 hp (750–930 kW) at 2600 rpm. Supercharger ratios were 6.23:1, 8.0:1 or 8.77:1, depending on altitude rating. These engines had the compression ratio increased to 6.65:1. Marvel MC-12 fuel injection, which was unsatisfactory and quickly replaced by a float-type carburetor on -9 and -13 models. Later dash number engines used Bendix pressure carburetors. These engines were being designed at the same time as the V-3420 engine, and shared many assemblies as they were developed. The "D" series engines were the last of the "early" V-1710 engines.

V-1710-E

"E" series engines were designed for remote gearbox applications using crankshaft-speed extension shafts and remote 1.8:1 gearboxes with SAE #60 hollow propeller shafts. The military models were V-1710-6, -17, -31, 35, -37, -47, -59, -63, -83, -85, -93, -103, -109, -117, -125, -127, -129, -133,-135 and -137, producing 1,100–2,830 hp (820–2,110 kW) at 3000 rpm. Supercharger gear ratios were: 6.44:1, 7.48:1, 8.10:1, 8.80:1 and 9.6:1 depending on altitude rating. These engines were a complete redesign, and did not share many components with the earlier engine series. Almost all components were interchangeable with later series engines and the V-3420, and could be assembled as right hand or left hand turning engines in either pusher or tractor applications.

V-1710-F

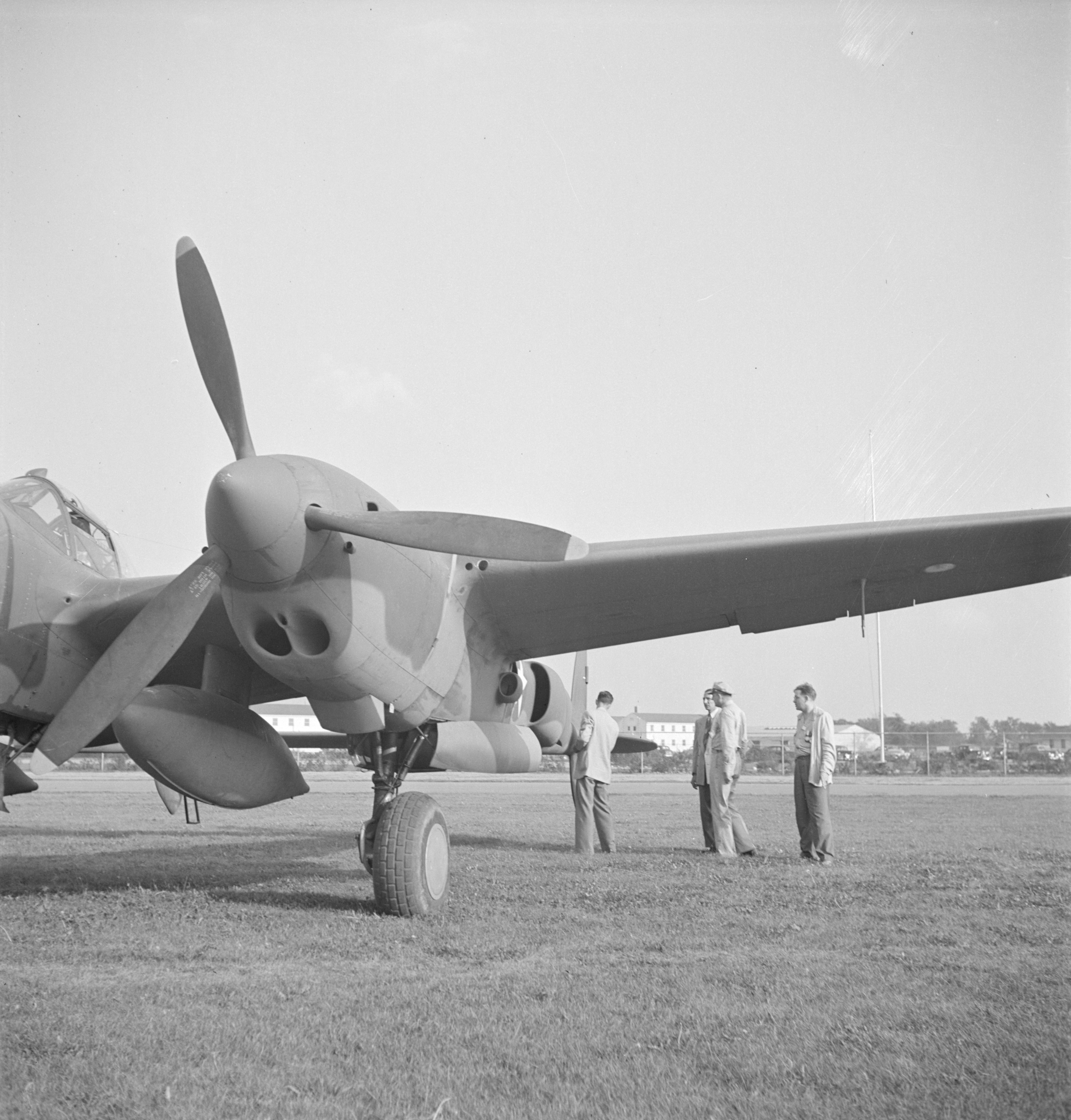
P-38G engine, in this case V-1710-51/55 (F10) which this series used

"F" series engines were designed for late model pursuit aircraft, and are identified by the compact external spur gear-type reduction gear box. Military models were V-1710-27, -29, -39, -45, -49, -51, -53, -55, -57, -61, -75, -77, -81, -87, -89, -91, -95, -99, -101, -105, -107, -111, -113, -115, -119, producing 1,150–1,425 hp (858–1,063 kW) at 3000 rpm. The V-1710-101, -119 and -121 models has an auxiliary supercharger, some with a liquid-cooled aftercooler. Supercharger gear ratios were: 6.44:1, 7.48:1, 8.10:1, 8.80:1 and 9.60:1 depending on altitude rating. These engines had either a six or twelve weight crankshaft, revised vibration dampeners that combined to allow higher engine speeds, SAE #50 propeller shaft, and higher horsepower ratings. The "E" series and "F" series engines were very similar, the primary difference being the front crankcase cover, which was interchangeable between the two series engines.

V-1710-G

"G" series engines were designed for high-altitude pursuit aircraft, and are identified by the auxiliary supercharger with a Bendix "Speed-Density" fuel control. Military models were V-1710-97, -131, -143, -145, and -147, producing 1,425–2,300 hp (1,063–1,715 kW) at 3000 rpm. Supercharger gear ratios were: 7.48:1, 7.76:1, 8.10:1, 8.80:1 and 9.60:1 depending on altitude rating. These engines were equipped with an SAE #50 propeller shaft and a single power lever to regulate engine performance, reducing the pilot's workload when managing this very complex engine.

V-1710-H

"H" series engines were to use a two-stage supercharger driven by a two-stage air-cooled power recovery turbine. The engine was to have an aftercooler and port-type fuel injection. This variant, however, was never built.

Selected Allison Engine Models
AEC Model	Military Model	Arrangement	Notes
A1	GV-1710-A		1 built. Rebuilt 2 times as XV-1710-2.
A2	XV-1710-1	Long reduction gear housing	Testing. 1 built.
B1R, B2R	XV-1710-4	Quick reversing, remote 90 degree gearbox	3 built for airships
C1, C2, C3, C4, C7, C10, C15	XV-1710-3, -5, -7, -9, -21, -33	Type test engines	16 built. C2 rebuilt from -5 to -7. C4 first flight engine in A-11A and later in XP-37
C8, C9	V-1710-11, -15	Long nose	3 built. C8 RH turn for XP-37, XP-38, C9 LH turn for XP-38
C13	V-1710-19	Long nose	Early production P-40 engine
D1, D2	YV-1710-7, -9, XV-1710-13	Pusher with extension shaft	6 built for XFM-1
E1, E2, E5	V-1710-6, -17, -37	Remote gearbox	5 built for XFL and XP-39
E4, E6	V-1710-35, -63	Remote gearbox	P-39C engine
E11, E21, E22, E27, E30, E31	V-1710-47, -93, -109, -117, -133, -135	Remote gearbox	P-63/A/C/D/E/F/G/H engine
E23RB, E23LRB	V-1710-129	Remote gearbox	Douglas XB-42 dual installation with combining gearbox and extension shafts
F1	V-1710-25	Short nose	1 built Development engine for XP-38
F2R, F2L	V-1710-27, -29	Short nose	P-38D/E engines
F3R	V-1710-37	Short nose	2 built for NA-73X Mustang prototype
F3R	V-1710-39	Short nose	P-40D/E and P-51A Production engine
F4R	V-1710-73	Short nose	P-40K engine
F5R, F5L	V-1710-49, -53	Short nose	P-38F engine
F10R, F10L	V-1710-51, -55	Short nose	P-38G engine
F15R, F15L	V-1710-75, -77	Short nose	XP-38K engine, 1,875 hp (WEP), geared 2.36 to 1 for use with Hamilton Standard Hydromatic "high activity" propellers
F30R, F30L	V-1710-111, -113	Short nose	P-38L engine
F32R	V-1710-119	Short nose and two-stage supercharger	XP-51J
G1R	V-1710-97		WER test engine
G3R	V-1710-131		geared drive
G4R			remote extension shaft drive version of G3R
G6R, G6L	V-1710-145 -147		P-82E/F engine

== Applications ==
- Bell FM-1 Airacuda
- Bell FL Airabonita
- Bell P-39 Airacobra
- Bell P-63 Kingcobra
- Boeing XB-38 Flying Fortress
- Curtiss P-40 Warhawk
- Curtiss-Wright XP-55 Ascender
- Curtiss XP-60A
- Curtiss P-37
- Douglas XB-42 Mixmaster
- Douglas DC-8
- Lockheed P-38 Lightning
- North American A-36 Apache
- North American F-82 Twin Mustang
- North American P-51A Mustang
- T29 Heavy Tank (trial)

== Specifications (V-1710-F30R / -111) ==
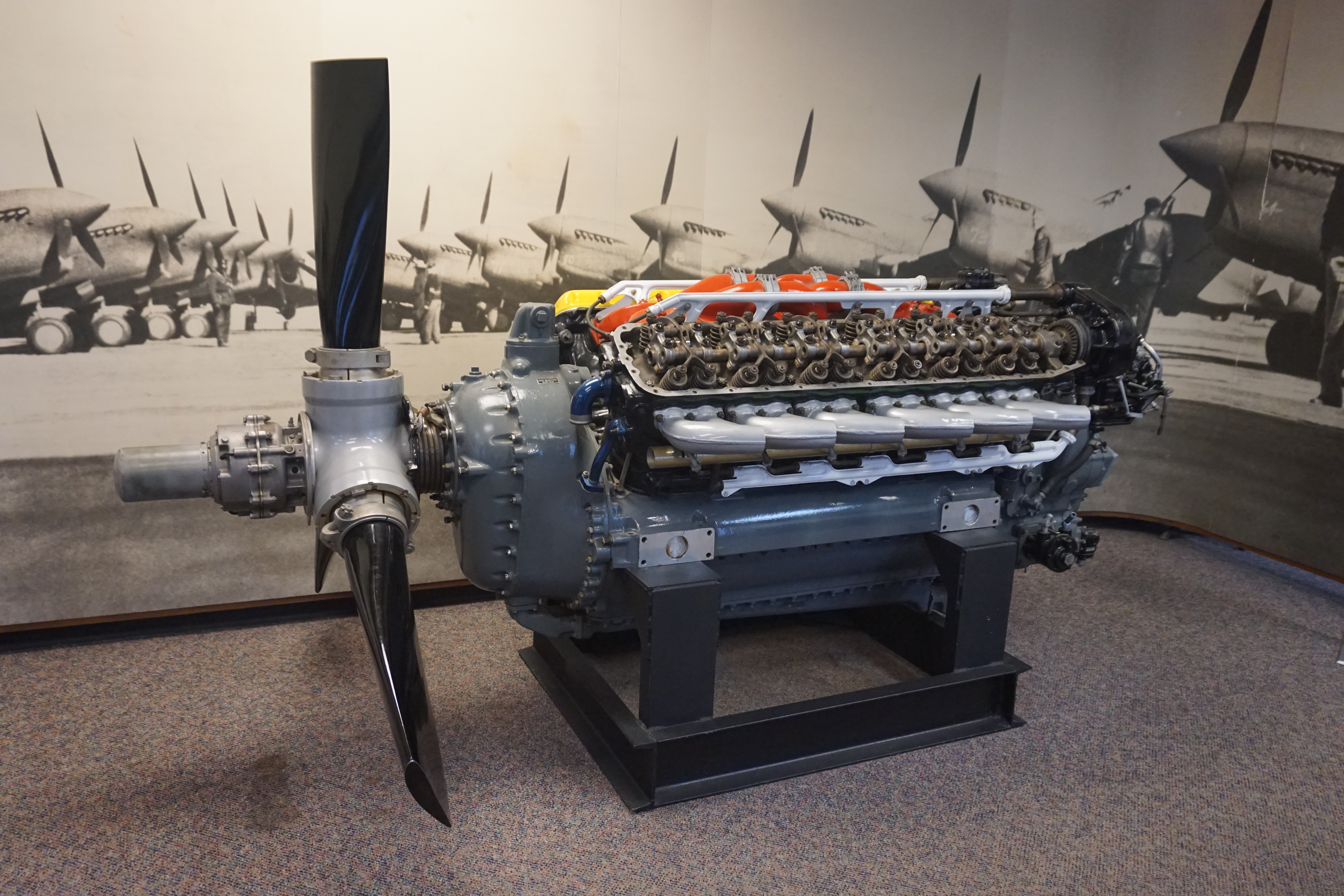
Allison V-1710 on display at the Air Zoo

Data from Aircraft Engines of the World 1946 and Jane's Fighting Aircraft of World War II.

=== General characteristics ===
- Type: 60° V12 twin-charged four-stroke liquid-cooled piston aircraft engine.
- Bore: 5.5 in (139.7 mm)
- Stroke: 6.0 in (152.4 mm)
- Displacement: 1,710 cu in (28.02 L)
- Length: 86 in (2,184 mm)
- Width: 29.3 in (744 mm)
- Height: 37.6 in (955 mm)
- Dry weight: 1,395 lb (633 kg)
- Frontal Area: 6.1 sq ft (0.6 m^{2})

=== Components ===
- Valvetrain: Two inlet and two exhaust valves per cylinder with sodium-cooled exhaust valves, operated by a single gear-driven overhead camshaft per bank of cylinders
- Supercharger: Centrifugal-type, single-stage, 8.1:1 gear ratio, 15-vane, 10.25 in (260 mm) diameter impeller
- Turbocharger: General Electric turbo-supercharger with intercooler
- Fuel system: 1 x Bendix-Stromberg PD-12K8 2-barrel pressure-type downdraught carburetor with automatic mixture control
- Fuel type: 100/130 octane gasoline
- Oil system: Pressure fed at 60–70 psi (414–483 kPa), dry sump with one pressure and two scavenge pumps.
- Cooling system: Liquid-cooled with a mixture of 70% water and 30% ethylene glycol, pressurized.
- Reduction gear: Spur reduction gear, 0.5:1 ratio, right hand tractor (V-1710-F30L / -113 is the same engine with LH rotation)
- Starter: Jack & Heinz JH-5L electric inertia starter
- Ignition: 1 x R.B. Bendix-Scintilla DFLN-5 dual magneto, 2 x 12 point distributors, 2 x spark plugs per cylinder fed by a shielded ignition harness.

=== Performance ===
- Power output:
  - Take-off: 1,500 hp (1,100 kW) at 3,000 rpm and 56.5 inHg 190 kPa (28 psi) manifold pressure
  - Military: 1,500 hp (1,100 kW) at 3,000 rpm at 30,000 ft (9,100 m)
  - Normal: 1,100 hp (820 kW) at 2,600 rpm at 30,000 ft (9,100 m)
  - Cruising: 800 hp (600 kW) at 2,300 rpm at 30,000 ft (9,100 m)
- Specific power: 0.88 hp/cu in (39.3 kW/L)
- Compression ratio: 6.65:1
- Oil consumption: 0.025 lb/hp/hr (0.01475 kg/kW/hr)
- Power-to-weight ratio: 1.05 hp/lb (1.76 kW/kg)

== See also ==
Related development

- Allison V-3420

Comparable engines

- Daimler-Benz DB 601 and 605
- Klimov VK-107
- Rolls-Royce Griffon
- Rolls-Royce Merlin

Related lists

- List of aircraft engines
