= Douglas D-906 =

D-906

General information
- Type: Super heavy transport
- Manufacturer: Douglas Aircraft
- Number built: 0

The Douglas D-906 was a paper project for a heavy lift transport by the Douglas Aircraft Company.

Douglas spent four years studying a heavy lift logistics aircraft capable of moving outsize payloads and Army units, for which no capability existed, under the CX-4 and Experimental Cargo-Heavy Logistics Support (CX-HLS) programs, which ultimately produced the C-5. The D-906 was one of them.

With a shoulder wing and six 30,000 lb (13,608 kg)-thrust turbofans, it superficially resembled the Antonov An-225. Planned payload was to be 195,000 lb (88,451 kg) for up to 3,260 nmi (3,750 mi; 6,040 km), with a takeoff weight of 606,000 lb (274,877 kg).

Length was to be 190 ft 8.5 in (58.13 m), span 192 ft 2.5 in (58.59 m), and wing area 4,920 ft^{2} (457 m^{2}).

== Sources ==
- Francillon, René J. McDonnell Douglas aircraft since 1920. New York: Putnam, 1979. Page 718.

This page uses content originally created here.
