= Douglas DA-1 Ambassador =

DA-1 Ambassador
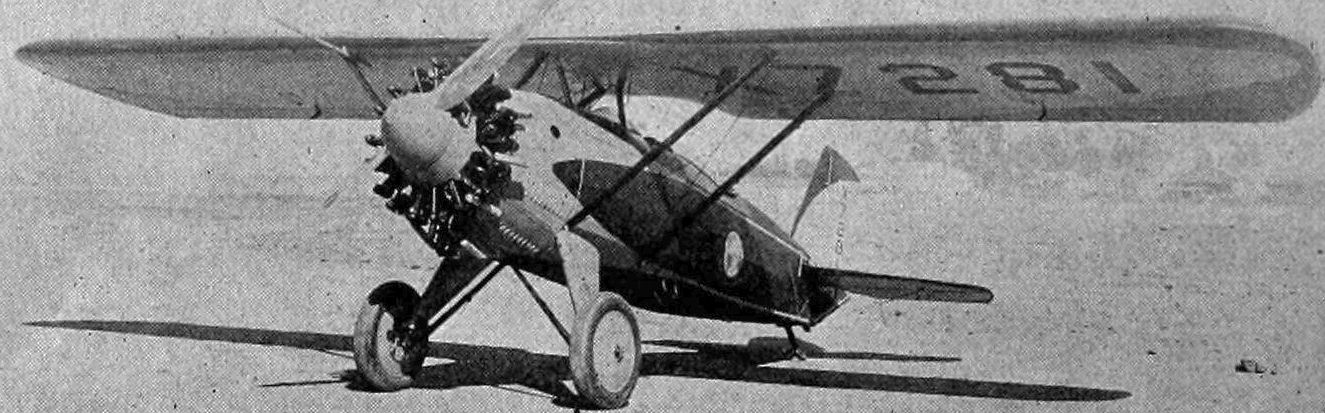

General information
- Type: Light aircraft
- National origin: United States of America
- Manufacturer: Douglas Aircraft Company
- Status: Prototype
- Number built: 1

History
- First flight: September 1928

The Douglas DA-1 Ambassador was an American single-engined light aircraft of the 1920s. It was a single-engined parasol-wing monoplane intended for private use, but only a single example was built, which was destroyed in a crash landing, causing development to be abandoned.

== Design and development ==
In 1926 the Douglas Aircraft Company designed and built a single example of the Commuter, a small two-seat high-wing monoplane intended as an inexpensive private aircraft. Boeing was busy building aircraft for the military, while there was severe competition at the cheap end of the market for private aircraft, so no production followed. Douglas did not completely abandon the private aircraft market, however, as the same year it started the design of a new, more capable light aircraft, the Douglas DA-1.

The DA-1 was a parasol-wing monoplane, with a fixed tailwheel undercarriage and powered by a 220 hp (164 kW) Wright Whirlwind radial engine. Unlike the mainly wooden Commuter, the DA-1 was of mixed construction, with the fuselage having a metal structure and the wings having spruce spars and ribs made of spruce with a plywood covering. It had tandem cockpits, and could carry two passengers in addition to the pilot, or be rigged with dual controls for pilot training.

Detailed design and construction proceeded slowly owing to Douglas's heavy workload, and the prototype DA-1, which had been ordered by Ambassador Airways of Texas, was not flown until September 1928. It was displayed at the 1928 National Air Races, and at air races at El Paso, Texas later that year, but while being flown back from El Paso to Douglas's factory at Santa Monica, California with Donald Douglas as passenger, it crashed on takeoff. Although no one was injured, the aircraft's undercarriage was wrecked, with the aircraft not being repaired, and no further examples being built.

== Specifications ==
Data from McDonnell Douglas Aircraft since 1920

General characteristics

- Crew: one
- Capacity: two passengers
- Length: 22 ft 6 in (6.86 m)
- Wingspan: 35 ft 0 in (10.67 m)
- Wing area: 212 sq ft (19.7 m^{2})
- Empty weight: 1,750 lb (794 kg)
- Gross weight: 2,530 lb (1,148 kg)
- Powerplant: 1 × Wright Whirlwind 9-cylinder air-cooled radial engine, 220 hp (160 kW)

Performance

- Maximum speed: 140 mph (230 km/h, 120 kn)
- Service ceiling: 14,500 ft (4,400 m)
- Rate of climb: 900 ft/min (4.6 m/s)
