= Douglas 1211-J =

Type of bomber aircraft

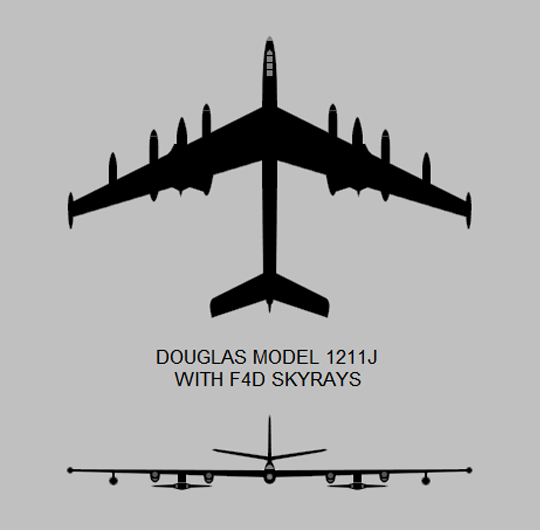

General information
- Type: Heavy bomber
- Manufacturer: Douglas Aircraft Company
- Status: Design only
- Primary user: United States Air Force

The Douglas 1211-J was a bomber aircraft design developed by American aircraft manufacturer Douglas to compete with the Boeing B-52 design for a major United States Air Force contract between 1946 and 1954. The Model 1211-J design was 160 feet long with a wingspan of 227 feet, and was powered by four turboprop engines. The aircraft was designed around a new 43,000-pound conventional bomb but could carry nuclear weapons as well. It could also carry its own fighter escorts, as parasites under its wings. These fighters' jet engines were to be powered up to assist the carrier bomber during takeoff; refueling of the fighters was to take place while they were stowed on the mothership's underwing pylons.

== Specifications ==
Data from Aviation Week, January 29, 1951

General characteristics

- Crew: 9 (pilot, co-pilot, engineer, navigator, bombardier, radar engineer, and relief flight crew)
- Length: 160 ft 6 in (48.92 m)
- Wingspan: 227 ft 6 in (69.34 m)
- Height: 44 ft 10 in (13.67 m)
- Gross weight: 322,000 lb (146,057 kg)
- Fuel capacity: 170,400 lb (77,300 kg)
- Tailplane span: 68 ft 1 in (20.75 m)
- Propellers: 14 ft (4.3 m) diameter contra-rotating propellers

Performance

- Maximum speed: 450 kn (520 mph, 830 km/h)
- Range: 11,000 nmi (13,000 mi, 20,000 km)
- Combat range: 4,340 nmi (4,990 mi, 8,040 km) – combat radius reaches 5,000 nmi (5,800 mi; 9,300 km) with increase in takeoff distance and reduction in combat ceiling
- Service ceiling: 50,000 ft (15,000 m)
- Rate of climb: 500 ft/min (2.5 m/s)
- Wing loading: 50 lb/sq ft (240 kg/m^{2})

Armament

- Guns: 2x 20 mm (0.787 in) cannon
- Bombs: 2x 2,000 lb (907.185 kg) bombs
- 2x TV-guided bombs

== See also ==
Aircraft of comparable role, configuration, and era

- Boeing B-52 Stratofortress
- Convair B-36 Peacemaker
