= Douglas 2229 =

Proposed supersonic transport

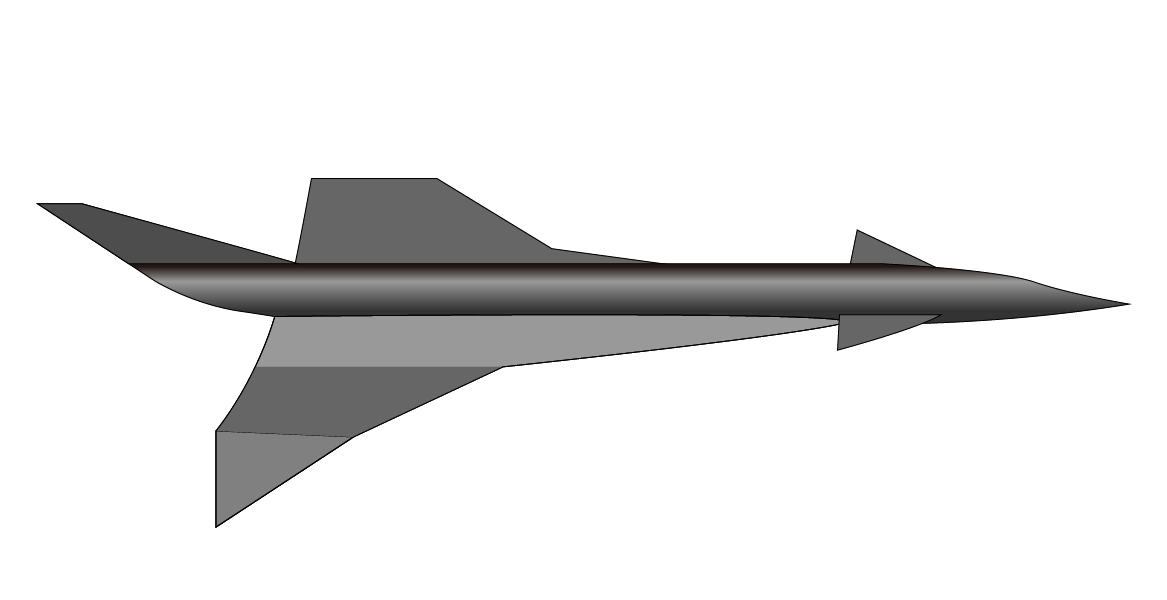
The Douglas 2229

Douglas Aircraft Company's Model 2229 was a proposed supersonic transport (SST) originally started as a private study. The design progressed as far as making mock-ups of the cockpit area and wind-tunnel models of the overall layout. After studying the design, Douglas concluded that the SST would not work economically, and declined to enter the Model 2229 in the National Supersonic Transport (NST) program in 1963.

== Development ==
=== Background ===
Through the 1950s, understanding of supersonic aerodynamics had improved to the point where sustained operation at high Mach was first becoming possible. A combination of new engines, engine intakes, new planforms like the delta wing, and new materials like titanium and stainless steel had solved many of the problems of earlier designs. By the late 1950s, the United States was in the midst of building two supercruising aircraft, the Lockheed A-12 and B-70 Valkyrie, and the UK was considering the Avro 730.

The concept of a supersonic transport seemed like a natural evolution of existing designs, which had long striven for "higher, faster". However, at supersonic speeds, lift works in a very different way that subsonic, and always less efficient. Subsonic transports of the era were reaching lift-to-drag ratios of about 19, whereas even the most advanced wing designs for SSTs were around 9. This was not a concern for military aircraft, where speed was life, but an SST would require twice as much fuel to move a passenger, increasing operational costs. To offset the operational costs, proponents of the SST concept suggested the lower trip times would command higher ticket prices. This would make them attractive to a segment of the market that currently paid higher ticket prices for first class seats. In theory, the faster trip times would also allow a reduction in costs needed to fly a given number of passengers, as fewer aircraft would be needed to cover a given route.

By 1960, several companies had shown models or mock-ups of SST designs, but most of these were trial balloons with no serious study behind them. But in an era when progress generally meant faster, there was a widespread feeling that the SST was the next natural step in aircraft design.

=== Douglas Model 2229 ===
Like other companies, Douglas had been considering the SST concept since the late 1950s. Invariably they were unimpressed with the results. In one case, the only room to be found for the required fuel load was in the fuselage, prompting one designer to sketch a cartoon showing the passengers sitting in diving suits immersed in the fuel under large signs saying "No Smoking!"

But as the market turned to the SST idea, Douglas started the 2229 project. This was one of the first serious efforts to be shown to the press. The 2229 broadly followed the layout introduced in the B-70, although it used the compound delta layout. The B-70 had a shoulder-mounted wing to best use compression lift generated by the nose and engine intakes, but this was not suitable for a transport where the fuselage is best situated above the wing for better visibility and easier loading. The wing stretched from the single vertical rudder at the rear almost to the front of the fuselage, where two much smaller delta canards were mounted high on the fuselage.

The four engines were situated in an 80 foot long box under the wing, like the B-70. Douglas' design differed in using two shock cones at the front of the intake, rather than the large splitter in the B-70. This led into a single large duct with three-part variable-profile walls that slowed the intake air to subsonic speeds. Behind this were separate ducts leading to the engines. The landing gear folded into the space beside the duct.

Other features were taken directly from the B-70. At high speeds the outer 20 feet of each wing folded down to improve compression lift, although to a much lower angle than the B-70's 75-degree droop. The nose area used the rising ramp from the B-70, as opposed to the drooping nose of the Concorde or Boeing 2707.

=== National Supersonic Transport ===
By early 1963 a number of forces were gathering to propel Bristol and Sud Aviation to consider merging features of their designs into a joint effort. Caught by patriotic pride, especially the support of Charles de Gaulle, these meetings gathered steam. By mid-1963 it was becoming clear that these efforts were likely to reach an agreement. Around the same time, it became known that the Soviet Union had started development of their own SST design.

This set off something of a panic in the US. Although their estimates and financial predictions continuously demonstrated very poor operating economics, political considerations overturned these concerns. By the spring of 1963 the Federal Aviation Administration (FAA) was well into the process of defining an SST development program, and the private announcement in May that Pan American Airlines had placed options on the Concorde overrode any remaining concerns. The SST program was announced on 5 June 1963.

=== Douglas declines ===
By this point the Model 2229 effort had progressed to detail design. The 100-passenger aircraft had settled at about 420,000 lb, heavier than the Boeing 707 while holding 20% fewer passengers. As the operational costs of an aircraft are roughly defined by the aircraft fuel use, a function of weight, divided by the number of passengers, these numbers were not encouraging.

The marketing department was no more impressed; examining a report by the Stanford Research Institute (SRI), they found that SRI had calculated a market for 325 aircraft based on the assumption that every route over 1000 miles would use an SST. Their own assumption was that only routes with high utilization would use them, leading to a market of only 151 aircraft. Considering that Douglas had yet to turn a profit on the DC-8 in spite of sales of over 200 aircraft, they were highly skeptical that there was any profit to be had.

On 26 August, Donald Douglas Jr. wrote a letter to the head of the FAA, Najeeb Halaby, saying that they would not be entering the 2229 into the NST program. In the letter, Douglas stated their main reasons were the problems involved in introducing new models of the DC-8 and DC-9, along with various military commitments, which left them struggling for development resources.

In spite of Douglas' letter glossing over their serious concerns, the press still felt their withdrawal from the program was serious. The New York Times reported that it was an example of "widespread industry caution" about the program. By this point, however, the program was well entrenched and led to the selection of the Boeing 2707 for the NST program.
