= Douglas Aircraft Company =

American aerospace company (1921–1967)

- Douglas Aircraft logo (1962–1967)
- Industry: Aerospace
- Founded: July 22, 1921; 105 years ago
- Founder: Donald Douglas
- Defunct: April 28, 1967; 59 years ago
- Fate: Merged with McDonnell Aircraft Corporation
- Successor: McDonnell Douglas
- Headquarters: Santa Monica, California, and Long Beach, California, U.S.
- Key people: Bill Bridgeman; LaVerne Ward Browne; Carl Cover; Ed Heinemann; Ted R. Smith

The Douglas Aircraft Company was an American aerospace and defense company that was based in Southern California. It was founded in 1921 by Donald Wills Douglas Sr., and merged with McDonnell Aircraft in 1967 to form McDonnell Douglas, where it operated as a division.

== History ==
=== 1920s ===
The company was founded as the Douglas Company by Donald Wills Douglas Sr. on July 22, 1921, in Santa Monica, California, following dissolution of the Davis-Douglas Company. An early claim to fame was the first circumnavigation of the world by air in Douglas airplanes in 1924. In 1923, the U.S. Army Air Service was interested in carrying out a mission to circumnavigate the Earth for the first time by aircraft, a program called "World Flight". Donald Douglas proposed a modified Douglas DT to meet the Army's needs. The two-place, open cockpit DT biplane torpedo bomber had previously been produced for the U.S. Navy. The DTs were taken from the assembly lines at the company's manufacturing plants in Rock Island, Illinois, and Dayton, Ohio, to be modified.

The modified aircraft known as the Douglas World Cruiser (DWC), also was the first major project for Jack Northrop who designed the fuel system for the series. After the prototype was delivered in November 1923, upon the successful completion of tests on November 19, the Army commissioned Douglas to build four production series aircraft. Due to the demanding expedition ahead, spare parts, including 15 extra Liberty L-12 engines, 14 extra sets of pontoons, and enough replacement airframe parts for two more aircraft were chosen. These were sent to airports along the route. The last of these aircraft was delivered to the U.S. Army on March 11, 1924.

The four aircraft left Seattle, Washington, on April 6, 1924, flying west, and two of these returned there on September 28 to great acclaim, while one plane had been lost under fog conditions, and another was forced down over the Atlantic and sank (the DWC prototype was then rechristened, and joined the other two in completing the North American leg of the flight). After the success of this flight, the Army Air Service ordered six similar aircraft as observation aircraft. The success of the DWC established the Douglas Aircraft Company among the major aircraft companies of the world and led it to adopt the motto "First Around the World – First the World Around".

Douglas initially used a logo that combined two letter Ds with two outstretched wings, and two Ds placed back to back to form a heart as a reference to Clan Douglas. After the success of the DWC, the company adopted a logo that showed three airplanes circling a globe. The logo eventually evolved into an aircraft, a missile, and a globe. This logo was later adopted by McDonnell Douglas in 1967, and became the basis of Boeing's current logo after their merger in 1997.

=== Pre-war ===
Douglas Aircraft designed and built a wide variety of aircraft for the U.S. military, including the Navy, Army Air Forces, Marine Corps, Air Force, and Coast Guard.

The company initially built torpedo bombers for the U.S. Navy, but it developed a number of different versions of these aircraft, including reconnaissance planes and airmail aircraft. Within five years, the company was building about 100 aircraft annually. Among the early employees at Douglas were Ed Heinemann, "Dutch" Kindelberger, Carl Cover, and Jack Northrop, who later founded the Northrop Corporation.

In the mid-1920s the company had manufacturing facilities in Santa Monica at what is now Douglas Park at 25th Street and Wilshire Boulevard. The company retained its military market and expanded into amphibian airplanes in the late 1920s, also moving its facilities to Clover Field at Santa Monica, California. The Santa Monica complex was so large, the mail girls used roller skates to deliver the intracompany mail. By the end of World War II, Douglas had facilities at Santa Monica, El Segundo, Long Beach, and Torrance, California; Tulsa and Midwest City, Oklahoma; and Chicago, Illinois. On November 30, 1928, the company was reorganized as the Douglas Aircraft Company.

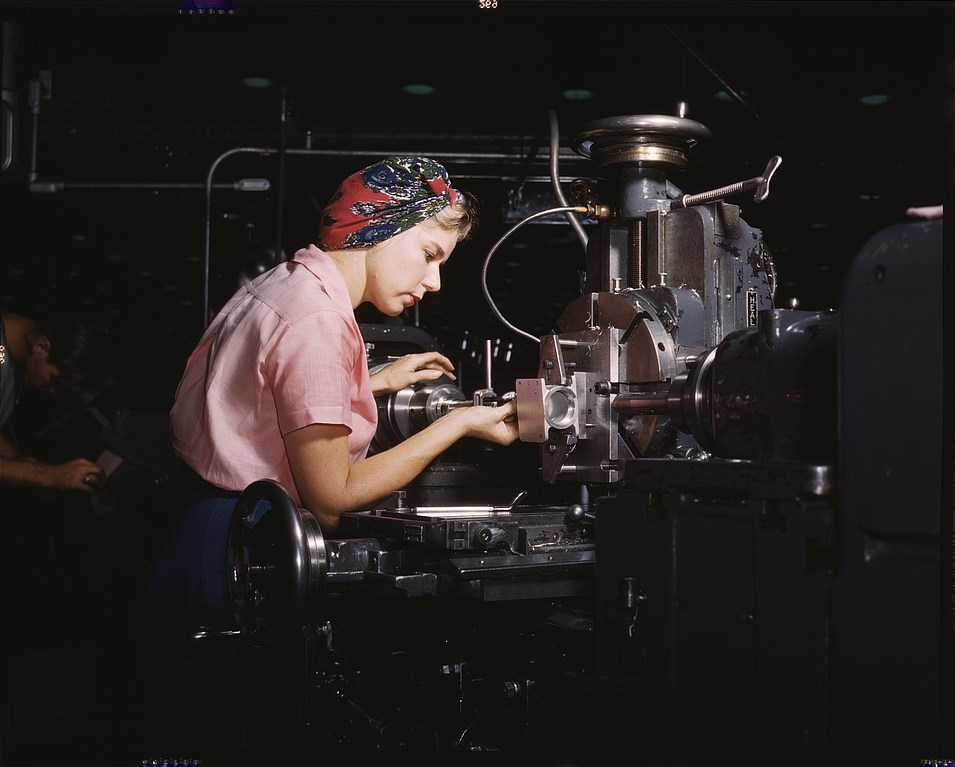
Female machine tool operator at the Douglas Aircraft plant, Long Beach, California in World War II. After losing thousands of male workers to military service, American manufacturers hired women for production positions, to the point where the typical aircraft plant's workforce was 40% female.

In 1934, Douglas produced a commercial twin-engined transport plane, the Douglas DC-2, followed by the famous DC-3 in 1936. The wide range of aircraft produced by Douglas included airliners, light and medium bombers, fighter aircraft, transports, reconnaissance aircraft, and experimental aircraft.

The company is most famous for the "DC" (Douglas Commercial) series of commercial aircraft, including what is often regarded as the most significant transport aircraft ever made: the Douglas DC-3, which was also produced as a military transport known as the C-47 Skytrain or "Dakota" in British service. Many Douglas aircraft have long service lives.

=== World War II ===
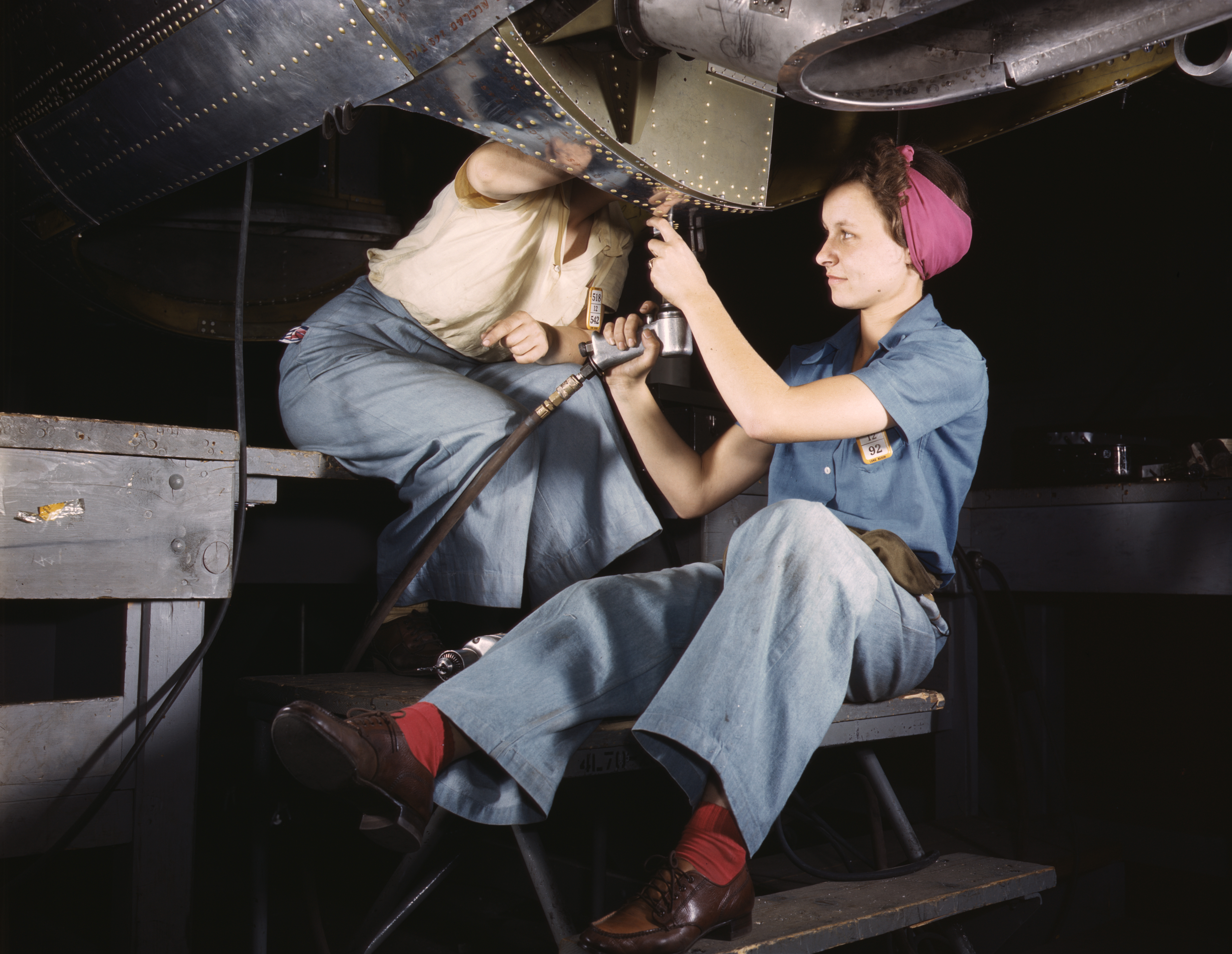
Women at work on bomber (probably B-17), Douglas Aircraft Company, Long Beach, California, in October 1942

During World War II, Douglas joined the BVD (Boeing-Vega-Douglas) consortium to produce the B-17 Flying Fortress. After the war, Douglas built another Boeing design under license, the B-47 Stratojet turbojet-powered bomber, at United States Air Force Plant 6 in Marietta, Georgia.

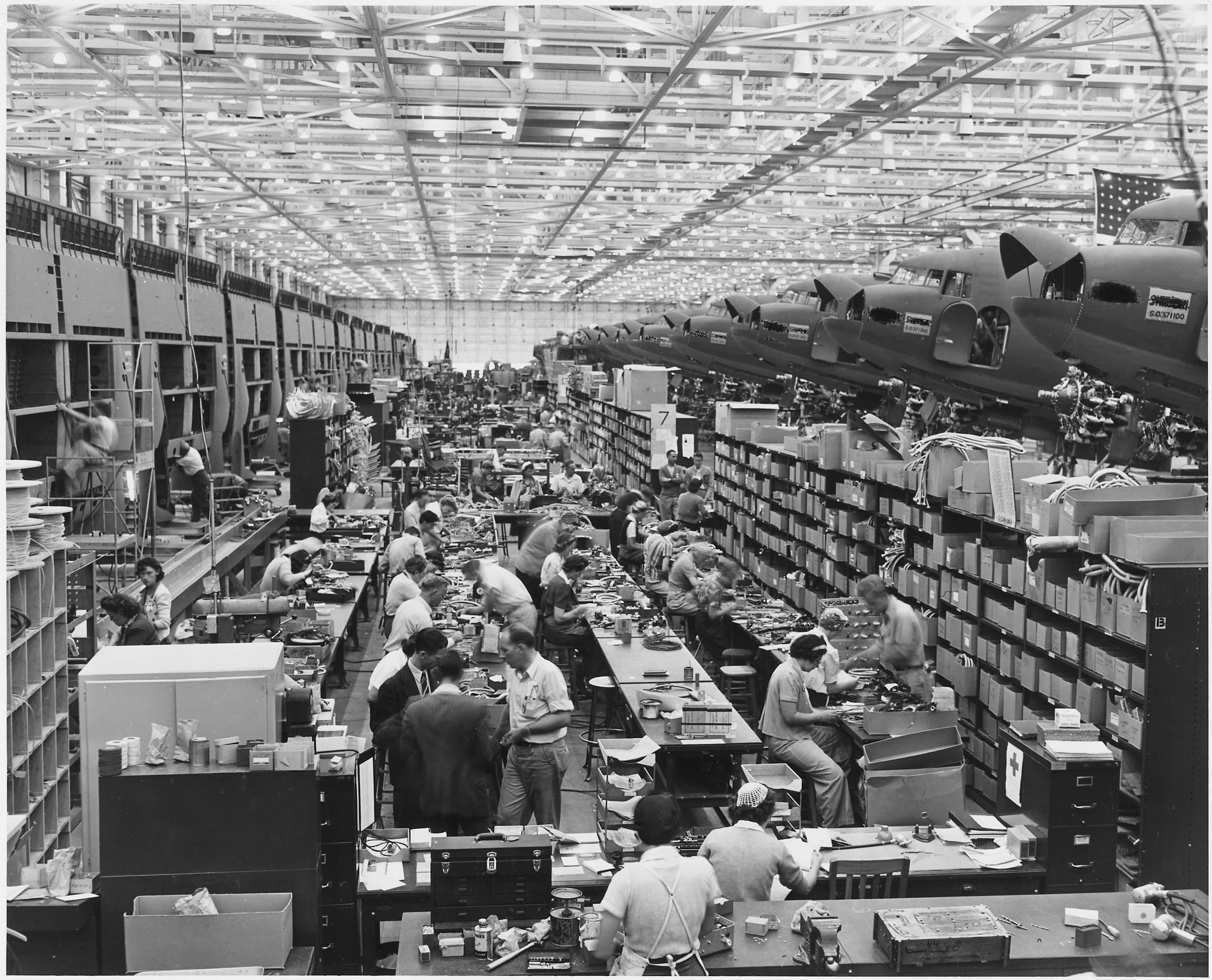
Stockroom at the Long Beach plant, c. 1942

World War II was a major boost for Douglas. Douglas ranked fifth among United States corporations in the value of wartime production contracts. The company produced almost 30,000 aircraft from 1942 to 1945, and its workforce swelled to 160,000. The company produced a number of aircraft including the C-47 Skytrain, the DB-7 (known as the A-20, Havoc or Boston), the SBD Dauntless dive bomber, and the A-26 Invader.

=== Post-war ===
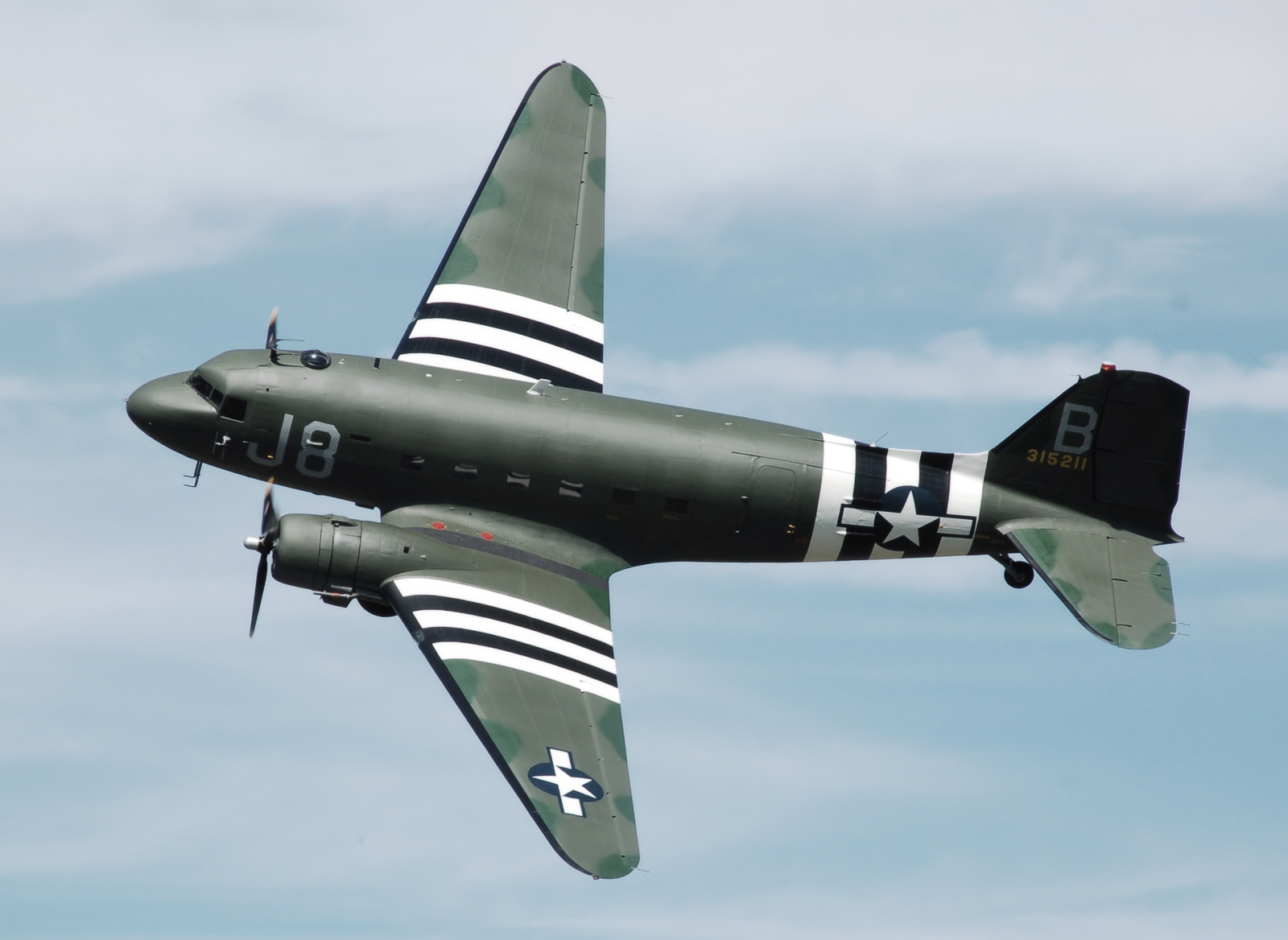
A retired US Air Force C-47A Skytrain, the military version of the DC-3, on display in England in 2010. This aircraft flew from a base in Devon, England, during the Invasion of Normandy.

Douglas Aircraft suffered cutbacks at the end of the war, with an end to government aircraft orders and a surplus of aircraft. It was necessary to cut heavily into its workforce, letting go of nearly 100,000 workers.

The United States Army Air Forces established 'Project RAND' (Research ANd Development) with the objective of looking into long-range planning of future weapons. In March 1946, Douglas Aircraft Company was granted the contract to research on intercontinental warfare. Project RAND later become the RAND Corporation.

Douglas continued to develop new aircraft, including the successful four-engined Douglas DC-6 (1946) and its last propeller-driven commercial aircraft, the Douglas DC-7 (1953). The company had moved into jet propulsion, producing its first for the U.S. Navy — the straight-winged F3D Skyknight in 1948 and then the more "jet age" style F4D Skyray in 1951. Douglas also made commercial jets, producing the Douglas DC-8 in 1958 to compete with the new Boeing 707.

Douglas was a pioneer in related fields, such as ejection seats, air-to-air missiles, surface-to-air missiles, and air-to-surface missiles, launch rockets, bombs, and bomb racks.

The company was ready to enter the new missile business during the 1950s. Douglas moved from producing air-to-air rockets and missiles to entire missile systems under the 1956 Nike missile program and became the main contractor for the Skybolt air-launched ballistic missile program and the Thor ballistic missile program. Douglas also earned contracts from NASA, most notably for designing the S-IVB stage of the Saturn IB and Saturn V rockets.

=== Mergers ===
In 1967, the company was struggling to expand production to meet demand for DC-8 and DC-9 airliners and the A-4 Skyhawk military attack aircraft. The company was also struggling with quality and cash flow problems and DC-10 development costs, as well as shortages due to the Vietnam War. Under the circumstances, Douglas was very receptive to an offer from McDonnell Aircraft Corporation. On April 28, 1967, after almost four years of merger talks, the two companies merged as McDonnell Douglas Corporation.

The two companies seemed to be a good match for each other. McDonnell was a major defense contractor, but had almost no civilian business. Douglas' commercial contracts would allow McDonnell to withstand any downturns in procurement. Conversely, McDonnell had enough revenue to help solve Douglas' financial problems; soon after the merger was announced, McDonnell bought 1.5 million shares of Douglas stock to help Douglas meet "immediate financial requirements".

The merged company was based at McDonnell's facility in St. Louis, Missouri. It adopted a modified version of Douglas' logo. Donald Wills Douglas Sr. became honorary chairman of the merged company, a post he would hold until his death in 1981. Douglas Aircraft Company continued as a wholly owned subsidiary of McDonnell Douglas, with Douglas' son, Donald Wills Douglas Jr., as president. Later, former McDonnell president David S. Lewis became chairman of Douglas Aircraft. His successful turnaround of the division allowed him to become president of McDonnell Douglas in 1969. Meanwhile, Douglas' space and missiles division became part of a new subsidiary called McDonnell Douglas Astronautics Company.

McDonnell Douglas later merged with its rival Boeing in 1997. Boeing merged Douglas Aircraft into the Boeing Commercial Airplanes division, and retired the Douglas Aircraft name after 76 years. The last Long Beach-built commercial aircraft, the Boeing 717 (third generation version of the Douglas DC-9), ceased production in May 2006. By 2011, the Boeing C-17 Globemaster III was the last aircraft being assembled at the Long Beach facility; the final C-17 was assembled in late 2015. However, the Douglas' former logo is preserved on the facility though no longer used by Boeing.

== Products ==
=== Aircraft ===
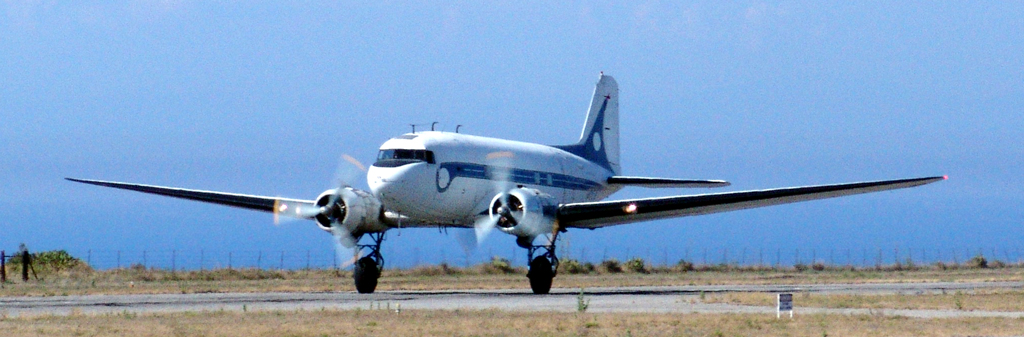
Douglas DC-3

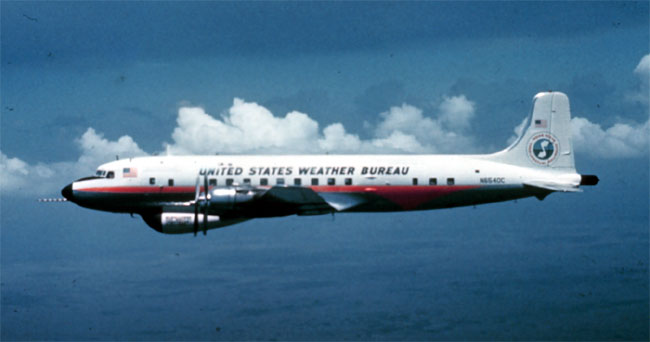
Douglas DC-6

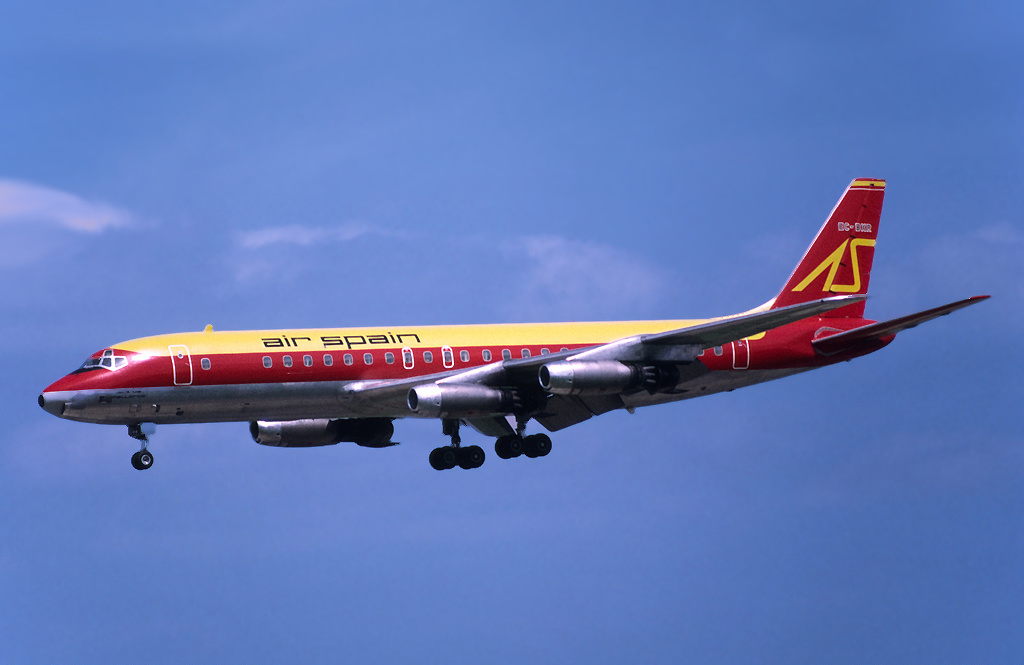
Air Spain DC-8-21

- Douglas 1211-J
- Douglas 2229
- Douglas A-1 Skyraider (1945)
- Douglas XA-2 (c. 1926)
- Douglas A-3 Skywarrior (1952)
- Douglas A-4 Skyhawk (1954)
- Douglas A-20 Havoc (1938)
- Douglas A-26 Invader (1942)
- Douglas A-33 (1941)
- Douglas A2D Skyshark (1950)
- Douglas Y1B-7, B-7, O-35 (1931)
- Douglas B-18 Bolo (1935)
- Douglas XB-19 (1941)
- Douglas XB-22 (1930s)
- Douglas B-23 Dragon (1939)
- Douglas XB-31
- Douglas XB-42 Mixmaster, XA-42 Mixmaster (1944)
- Douglas XB-43 Jetmaster (1946)
- Douglas B-66 Destroyer (1954)
- Douglas BTD Destroyer (1943)
- Douglas C-1 (1925)
- Douglas C-47 Skytrain
  - Douglas AC-47 Spooky
  - Douglas XCG-17
- Douglas C-54 Skymaster (1942)
- Douglas C-74 Globemaster (1945)
- Douglas C-124 Globemaster II (1949)
- Douglas C-132 (1957, canceled)
- Douglas C-133 Cargomaster (1956)
- Douglas Cloudster (1921)
- Douglas Cloudster II (1947)
- Douglas D-558-1 Skystreak (1947)
- Douglas D-558-2 Skyrocket (1948)
- Douglas D-906
- Douglas DA-1 Ambassador (1928)
- Douglas DC-1 (1933)
- Douglas DC-2 (1934)
- Douglas DC-3 (1935)
  - List of Douglas DC-3 family variants
- Douglas DC-4E (1938)
- Douglas DC-4 (1939; new design unrelated to DC-4E)
  - List of Douglas DC-4 variants
- Douglas DC-5 (1939)
- Douglas DC-6 (1946)
- Douglas DC-7 (1953)
- Douglas DC-8 (piston airliner)
- Douglas DC-8 (1958)
- Douglas DC-9 (1965)
- Douglas DF (1930s)
- Douglas DT (1921)
- Douglas Dolphin (1930)
- Douglas XFD (1933)
- Douglas F3D Skyknight (1948)
- Douglas F4D Skyray (1951)
- Douglas F5D Skylancer (1956)
- Douglas F6D Missileer (1959, canceled)
- Douglas M-1 (1925)
- Douglas O-2 (1924)
- Douglas O-31 (1930)
- Douglas O-38 (1931)
- Douglas O-43 (1934)
- Douglas O-46 (1936)
- Douglas O2D (1934)
- Douglas YOA-5 (1935)
- Douglas XP-48
- Douglas XP3D (1935)
- Douglas SBD Dauntless (1938)
- Douglas XT-30
- Douglas T2D (1927)
- Douglas XT3D (1931)
- Douglas TBD Devastator (1935)
- Douglas XTB2D Skypirate (1945)
- Douglas World Cruiser (DWC) (1923)
- Douglas X-3 Stiletto (1952)

=== Missiles and spacecraft ===
- Roc I
- AAM-N-2 Sparrow I (1948)
- MIM-3 Nike Ajax (1959)
- MGM-5 Corporal
  - WAC Corporal
- MIM-14 Nike Hercules
- Thor (rocket family)
  - PGM-17 Thor
  - Thor-Able
  - Thor-Ablestar
  - Thor-Agena
  - Thorad-Agena
  - Thor DSV-2
  - Thor DSV-2U
  - Thor-Burner
  - Thor-Delta
- LIM-49 Spartan
- LIM-49 Nike Zeus
- GAM-87 Skybolt
- MGR-1 Honest John
- AIR-2 Genie (1956)
- MGR-3 Little John
- Delta
- Douglas SASSTO
- Saturn S-IV stage
- Saturn S-IVB stage
- Manned Orbiting Laboratory space station

== Appearances in media ==
- A Douglas Aircraft B-17 assembly line, the one in Long Beach, is featured in the 1944 drama An American Romance.

== See also ==
- California during World War II
- List of preserved Douglas aircraft
