= Douglas XT-30 =

Proposed American trainer aircraft

XT-30

General information
- Type: Advanced trainer
- National origin: United States
- Manufacturer: Douglas Aircraft Company
- Status: Not built

The Douglas XT-30 was a proposed American military advanced trainer. It was never built.

== Design and development ==
Intended to replace the North American T-6 Texan, the XT-30 was designed in 1948 for a United States Air Force competition. The design had an 800 hp (600 kW) Wright R-1300 radial mounted amidships behind the cockpit (in the fashion of the P-39), in a rather squared-off fuselage. The R-1300 drove a three-bladed propeller by way of an extension shaft (driveshaft). The XT-30 design seated pilot and pupil in tandem, under a framed greenhouse canopy and had a straight low wing.

Competing against the North American T-28 Trojan, the more complex XT-30 was not selected for production and none were built.

== Specifications (projected) ==
Data from McDonnell Douglas aircraft since 1920 : Volume I

General characteristics

- Crew: 2
- Length: 36 ft 9.5 in (11.214 m)
- Wingspan: 36 ft 4 in (11.07 m)
- Gross weight: 5,999 lb (2,721 kg)
- Powerplant: 1 × Wright R-1300 Cyclone 7 7-cylinder air-cooled radial piston engine, 800 hp (600 kW)
- Propellers: 3-bladed constant-speed propeller driven through extension shafts

Performance

- Maximum speed: 286 mph (460 km/h, 249 kn)
- Cruise speed: 190 mph (310 km/h, 170 kn)
- Endurance: 6 hours 30 minutes
- Service ceiling: 29,600 ft (9,000 m)

== See also ==
- North American T-28 Trojan
