= Douglas Cloudster =

Two-seat long-range biplane

Cloudster
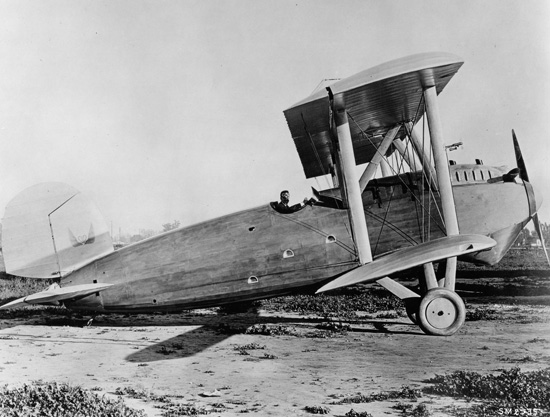

General information
- Type: Two-seat long-range biplane
- Manufacturer: Davis-Douglas Company
- Designer: Donald Douglas
- Status: Destroyed
- Number built: 1

History
- First flight: 24 February 1921
- Retired: 1926

The Douglas Cloudster was a 1920s American biplane aircraft. It was the only product of the Davis-Douglas Company, and was designed to make the first non-stop flight coast-to-coast across the United States.

== Development ==
The Davis-Douglas Company was formed in July 1920 to enable Donald Douglas to design and build an aircraft capable of non-stop flight coast-to-coast across the United States. David R. Davis provided the financing for the company. The resulting aircraft was the Cloudster, a single-bay equal-span biplane of wooden construction designed to carry payload of equivalent weight. It was fabric-covered except for the forward fuselage, which was clad in sheet metal. The aircraft was powered by a 400 hp (298 kW) Liberty V-12 piston engine.

The Cloudster first flew on 24 February 1921, the aircraft broke the Pacific Coast altitude record by climbing 19,160 ft (5839 m) on 19 March that year, and attempted the coast-to-coast journey in June. The aircraft failed to make a non-stop journey due to engine failure, it had to make a forced landing at Fort Bliss, Texas on 27 June 1921. In 1923, the Cloudster was sold and modified for sightseeing flights, with two additional open cockpits and seats for five passengers replacing one of the fuel tanks. In 1925 it was again sold to T. Claude Ryan, who had it modified further by adding an enclosed cabin with ten seats, the aircraft became the flagship of Ryan's San Diego–to–Los Angeles airline, one of the first scheduled passenger lines in the country. It was subsequently used by a number of operators and flew beer to Tijuana, Mexico after the 1926 flood, before it made a forced landing in shallow water off the coast of Ensenada, Baja California in December 1926. It was damaged beyond repair by the tide before it could be recovered.

Following the failure of the coast-to-coast flight, Davis lost interest and Douglas went on to form the Douglas Company (later the Douglas Aircraft Company) in July 1921.

== 1945 Cloudster II ==
Douglas Aircraft would revive the name in 1945 for a proposed general aviation aircraft with a pusher propeller, similar to the XB-42, as the Cloudster II. The company's last effort in general aviation, it was not a success.

== Specifications (Davis-Douglas Cloudster) ==
Data from McDonnell Douglas aircraft since 1920 : Volume I

General characteristics

- Length: 36 ft 9 in (11.20 m)
- Wingspan: 55 ft 11 in (17.04 m)
- Height: 12 ft 0 in (3.66 m)
- Gross weight: 9,600 lb (4,354 kg)
- Fuel capacity: 660 US gal (550 imp gal; 2,500 L) fuel in two fuel tanks with 50 US gal (42 imp gal; 190 L) oil in a single tank
- Powerplant: 1 × Liberty L-12 V-12 water-cooled piston engine, 400 hp (300 kW)
- Propellers: 2-bladed fixed-pitch wooden propeller

Performance

- Maximum speed: 120 mph (190 km/h, 100 kn)
- Cruise speed: 85 mph (137 km/h, 74 kn)
- Range: 550 mi (890 km, 480 nmi)
- Ferry range: 2,800 mi (4,500 km, 2,400 nmi)
- Endurance: 33 hours
- Service ceiling: 19,160 ft (5,840 m)
- Power/mass: 0.417 hp/lb (0.686 kW/kg)
