= Douglas Cloudster II =

American prototype five-seat light aircraft, built 1947

Cloudster II
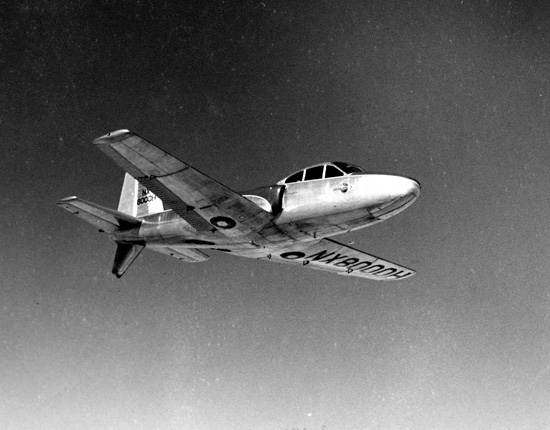

General information
- Type: Light aircraft
- National origin: United States of America
- Manufacturer: Douglas Aircraft Company
- Status: Prototype only
- Number built: 1

History
- First flight: March 12, 1947

The Douglas Cloudster II was an American prototype five-seat light aircraft of the late 1940s. It was of unusual layout, with two buried piston engines driving a single pusher propeller. Only a single example was built, which flew only twice, as it proved too expensive to be commercially viable.

== Design and development ==
During the early 1940s, Douglas Aircraft Company developed a configuration for high-performance twin-engined aircraft, in which the engines were buried in the fuselage, driving propellers mounted behind a conventional tailplane, in order to reduce drag by eliminating drag inducing objects such as engines from the wing. This layout was first demonstrated in the Douglas XB-42 Mixmaster bomber, which first flew in 1944, showing a 30% reduction in drag compared with a conventional twin-engined layout, while eliminating handling problems due to asymmetric thrust when flying on one engine.

Owing to the initial success of the XB-42, Douglas adopted this promising new layout for a medium-range airliner, the DC-8 and a five-seat light aircraft suitable for executive or air charter use, the Model 1015 or Cloudster II.

The Cloudster II was a low-winged monoplane with a retractable nosewheel undercarriage. The pilot and four passengers sat in an enclosed cabin well ahead of the unswept, laminar flow wing. Two air-cooled piston engines were buried in the rear fuselage, driving a single eight foot diameter twin-bladed propeller, mounted behind the empennage via driveshafts taken from P-39 fighters. Two air intakes forward of the wing directed cooling air to the engines, which then exhausted beneath the fuselage.

== Operational history ==
The Cloudster II made its maiden flight on March 12, 1947. Although the aircraft's performance and handling were good, it suffered from excessive vibration, and overheated when it was on the ground. Further development was abandoned late in 1947, with the prototype having flown only twice, as the post-war civil flying market had not developed as hoped, while the selling price had risen from an originally planned $30,000 to $68,000, rendering the aircraft commercially unviable.

== Specifications ==
Data from McDonnell Douglas Aircraft since 1920

General characteristics

- Crew: one
- Capacity: four passengers
- Length: 39 ft 10 in (12.13 m)
- Wingspan: 35 ft 4 in (10.78 m)
- Height: 12 ft 0 in (3.66 m)
- Empty weight: 3,200 lb (1,451 kg)
- Gross weight: 5,085 lb (2,307 kg)
- Powerplant: 2 × Continental E250 six-cylinder air-cooled piston engine, 250 hp (190 kW) each (Note: states two Continental W-670 of equivalent rating.)

Performance

- Maximum speed: 229 mph (369 km/h, 199 kn) at 1,200 ft (365 m)
- Cruise speed: 200 mph (320 km/h, 170 kn)
- Range: 950 mi (1,530 km, 830 nmi)
- Ferry range: 1,175 mi (1,891 km, 1,021 nmi)
- Service ceiling: 22,200 ft (6,800 m)
- Rate of climb: 1,500 ft/min (7.6 m/s)

== See also ==
- Douglas Cloudster: An aircraft built in the 1920s to attempt the first non-stop coast-to-coast crossing of the United states. It shared the same name, but was otherwise unrelated.

Aircraft of comparable role, configuration, and era

- Douglas XB-42 Mixmaster
- Douglas DC-8 (piston airliner)
- Lockheed Big Dipper
- Planet Satellite
- Waco Aristocraft
