= Douglas XB-43 Jetmaster =

American bomber prototype

XB-43 Jetmaster
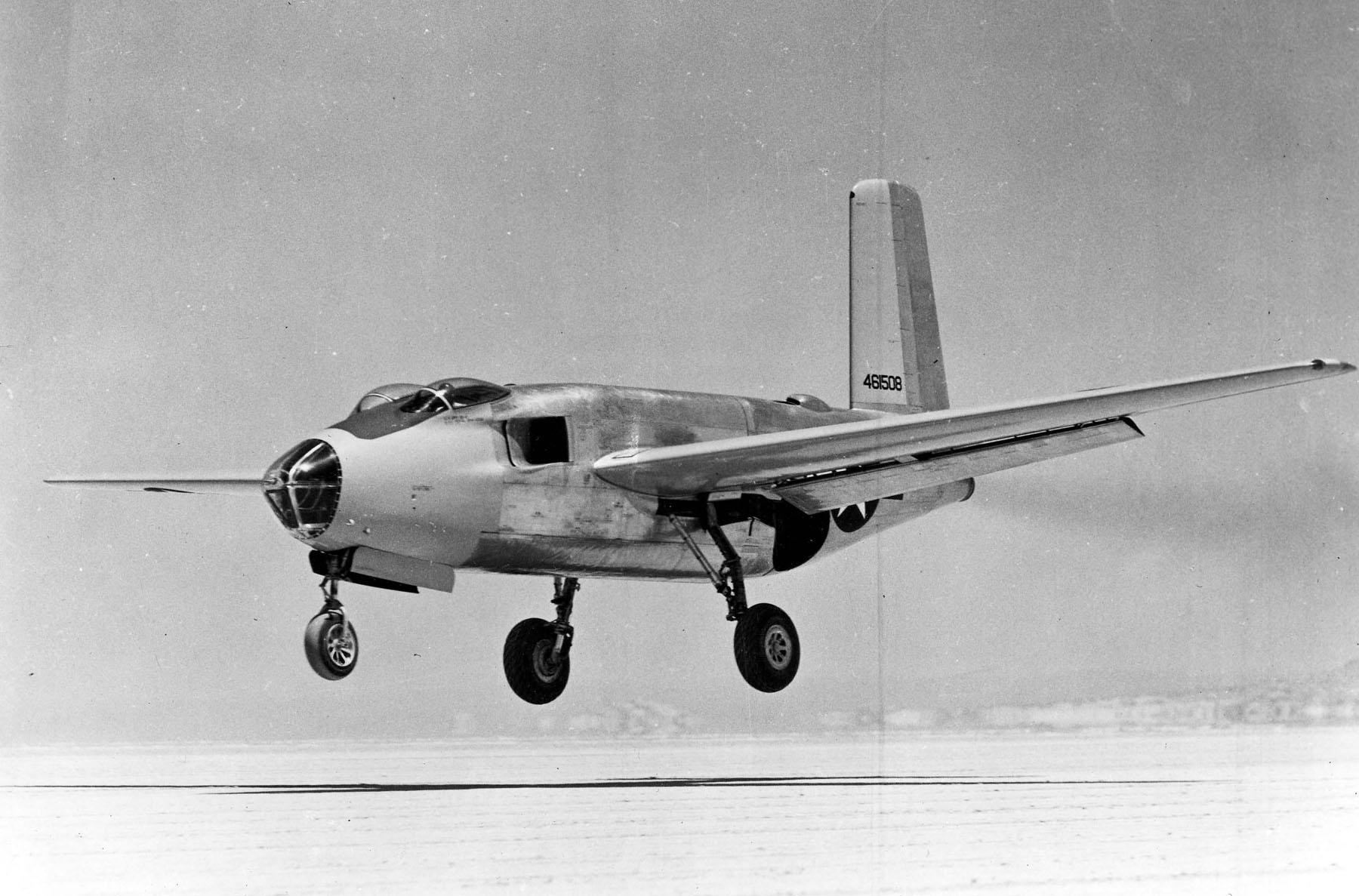
- The first prototype aircraft, XB-43 number 44-61508

General information
- Type: Prototype bomber aircraft
- Manufacturer: Douglas Aircraft Company
- Number built: 2

History
- First flight: 17 May 1946
- Developed from: Douglas XB-42 Mixmaster

The Douglas XB-43 Jetmaster is an American 1940s jet-powered prototype bomber. The XB-43 was a development of the XB-42, replacing the piston engines of the XB-42 with two General Electric J35 engines of 4,000 lbf (17.8 kN) thrust each. Despite being the first American jet bomber to fly, it suffered stability issues and the design did not enter production.

== Design and development ==
United States Army Air Forces (USAAF) leaders in the Air Materiel Command began to consider the possibilities of jet-propelled bombers as far back as October 1943. At that time, Douglas Aircraft was just beginning to design a promising twin-engine bomber designated the XB-42. Reciprocating engines powered this aircraft but they were buried in the fuselage, leaving the laminar flow-airfoil wing clean of any drag-inducing pylon mounts or engine cowlings. The airframe appeared ideally suited to test turbojet propulsion. Douglas confirmed the feasibility of the concept and the USAAF amended the XB-42 contract in March 1944 to include the development of two turbojet-powered XB-43 prototypes, reduced from an initial order of 13 test aircraft.

The Douglas design team convinced the Army that modifying the XB-42 static test airframe into the first XB-43 was a relatively straightforward process that would save time and money compared to developing a brand new design. Douglas replaced the two Allison V-1710 engines with a pair of General Electric (GE) J35 turbojets (the first American axial-flow jet engines ever used), then cut two air intakes into each side of the fuselage, aft of the pressurized cockpit. Removing the propellers and drive shafts freed enough space for two long jet exhaust ducts. Without any propellers present, there was no chance of striking the blade tips on the runway, so the entire ventral fin/rudder unit of the earlier XB-42's full four-surface cruciform tail was omitted. Douglas compensated for the loss of yaw stability by enlarging the dorsal fin/rudder unit.

Douglas Aircraft was keen to mass-produce the new bomber and the USAAF considered ordering 50. The company was poised to roll out as many as 200 B-43s per month in two versions: a bomber equipped with a clear plastic nose for the bombardier, and an attack aircraft without the clear nose and bombing station but carrying 16 forward-firing .50 in (12.7 mm) machine guns and 36 5 in (127 mm) rockets. Nothing came of these plans. The USAAF was already moving ahead with a new bomber, the XB-45 Tornado, designed from the outset for turbojet power and promising major improvement in every category of performance.

== Operational history ==
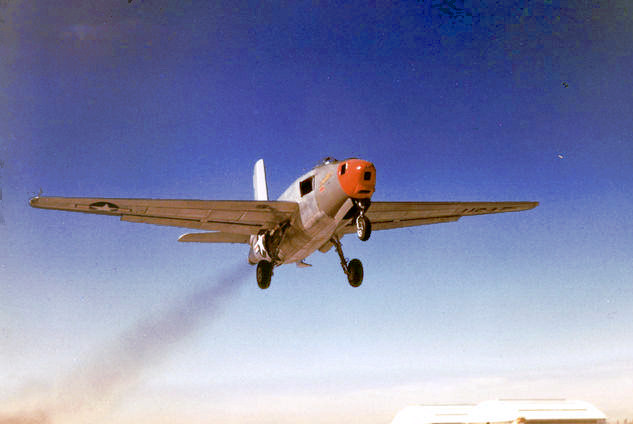
The second aircraft, YB-43 Versatile II, taking off. Undated. Note the solid, orange nose-cone that replaced the original clear nose

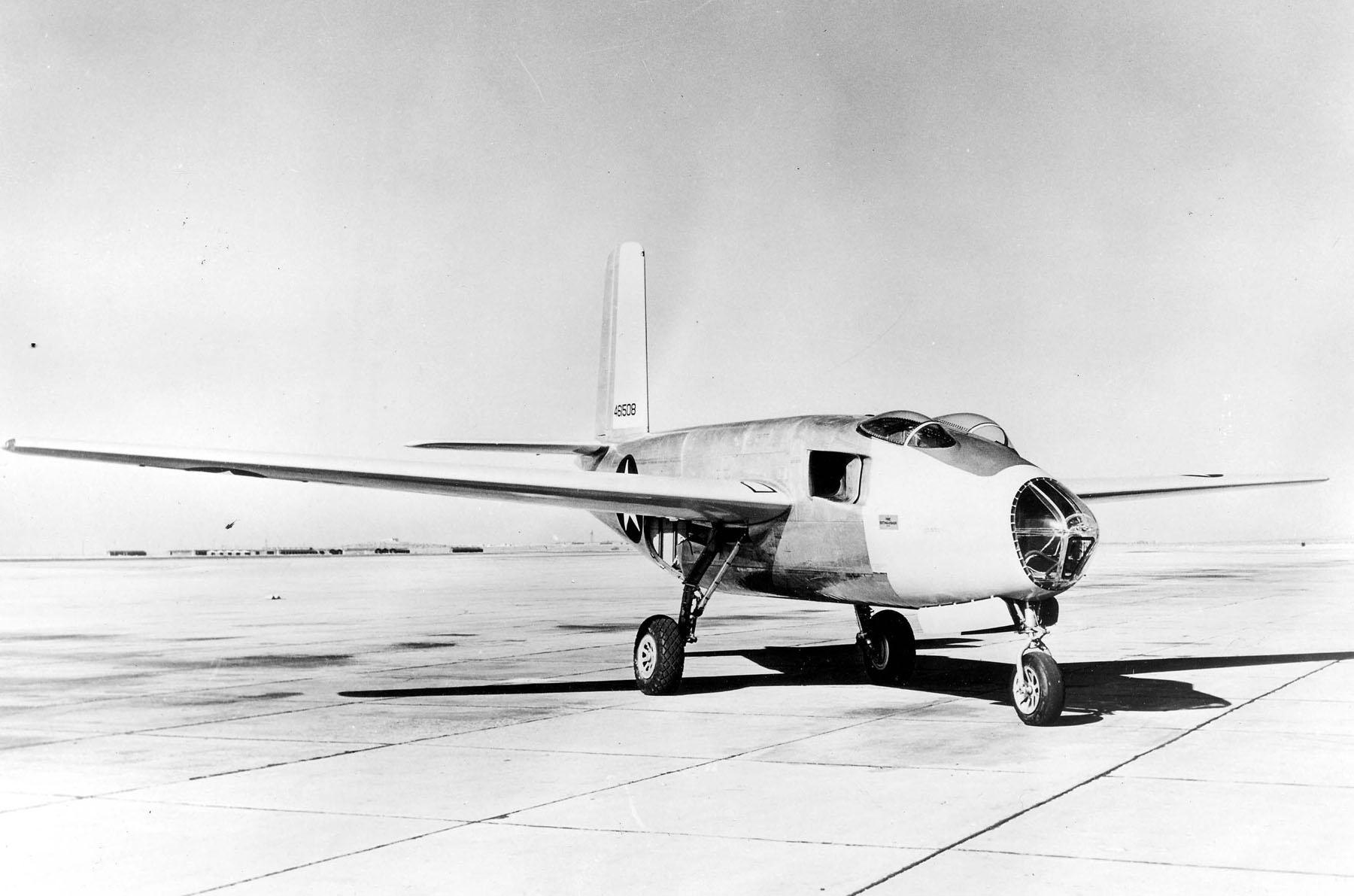
A front 3/4 view of the aircraft

As Douglas predicted, the work itself was not overly complex but almost two years were required to ready the aircraft for flight due to delays in obtaining the J35 powerplants. The end of World War II caused a general slowdown within the aviation industry and GE was late delivering the engines. When they were at last installed and tested on the ground, one of the units failed catastrophically. Compressor blades exploded through the engine casing, damaging the surrounding airframe and injuring a ground technician. Another seven-month delay ensued for repairs. America's first turbojet bomber finally flew from Muroc Army Air Base on 17 May 1946, piloted by Douglas test pilot, Bob Brush, accompanied by engineer Russell Thaw.

Caught in a momentous technological shift, the XB-43 contributed to developing procedures for flying the new jet bombers, and it gave yeoman service testing new turbojet engines. Douglas completed the second prototype, AAF serial number 44-61509, flying on 15 May 1947 and delivered it to Muroc Air Force Base, California, in April 1948. The USAAF soon replaced one J35 turbojet engine with a General Electric J47. Douglas delivered the second prototype, designated YB-43, in April 1948. That aircraft was nicknamed Versatile II by USAAF personnel. When the clear plastic nose began to crack from variations in temperature at high and low altitudes, mechanics fashioned a more durable replacement made from plywood. To keep it flying, the US Air Force cannibalized parts from the first XB-43 after it was damaged in February 1951. Versatile II flew more than 300 hours until its retirement in December 1953.

The U.S. Air Force only considered the first prototype to fall under the XB-43 designation. The second prototype, though functionally identical to the first, was designated YB-43, consistent with its status as a follow-on prototype under the Army's designation system for aircraft. At one point, the aircraft may have also been designated as "attack" aircraft, A-43 (not to be confused with the Curtiss XP-87, a project which started as an attack aircraft under the same designation). The A-43 was to have eight machine guns in a solid nose replacing the bombardier's position.

== Aircraft disposition ==
- 44-61508: destroyed when used for target practice in the desert.
- 44-61509: in storage awaiting restoration in the Restoration Hangar at the National Museum of the United States Air Force in Dayton, Ohio. The YB-43 was turned over to the Smithsonian Institution in 1954. It was stored while awaiting restoration at the Smithsonian's Paul Garber Facility (National Air and Space Museum) in Suitland, Maryland. In late 2010, it was transferred, along with the sole surviving Douglas XB-42 Mixmaster, to the National Museum of the United States Air Force in Dayton, Ohio where they are awaiting restoration in the Restoration Hangars. Once completed, they will be displayed in the museum's Experimental Aircraft Hangar.

== Specifications (XB-43) ==
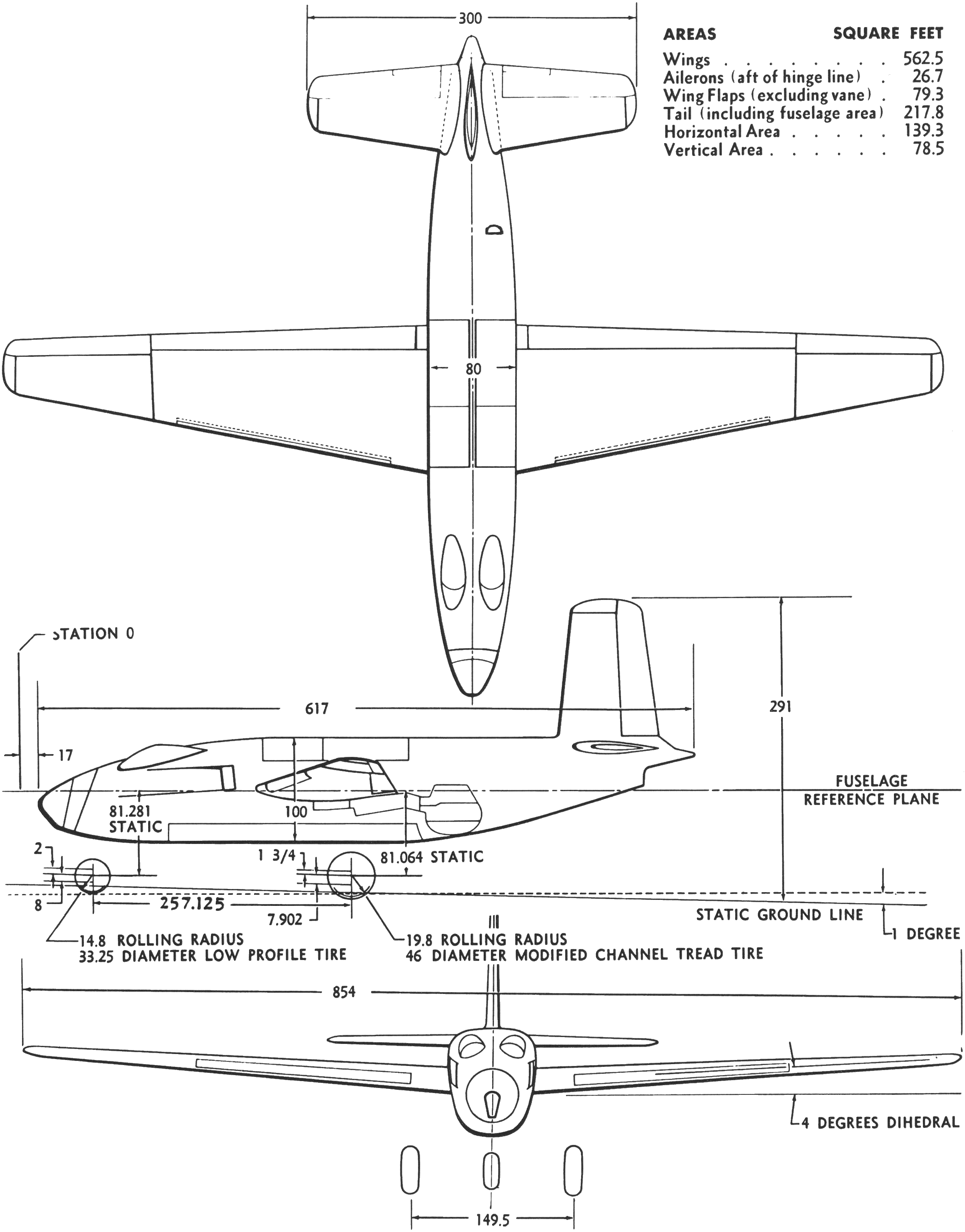
3-view drawing of the Douglas XB-43

Data from McDonnell Douglas aircraft since 1920 : Volume I

General characteristics

- Crew: 2
- Length: 51 ft 2 in (15.60 m)
- Wingspan: 71 ft 2 in (21.69 m)
- Height: 24 ft 3 in (7.39 m)
- Wing area: 563 sq ft (52.3 m^{2})
- Airfoil: Douglas G-17
- Empty weight: 21,775 lb (9,877 kg)
- Gross weight: 37,000 lb (16,783 kg)
- Max takeoff weight: 39,533 lb (17,932 kg)
- Powerplant: 2 × General Electric J35-GE-3 turbojet engines, 3,750 lbf (16.7 kN) thrust each

Performance

- Maximum speed: 515 mph (829 km/h, 448 kn) at sea level
- Cruise speed: 420 mph (680 km/h, 360 kn)
- Range: 1,100 mi (1,800 km, 960 nmi)
- Ferry range: 2,840 mi (4,570 km, 2,470 nmi)
- Service ceiling: 38,500 ft (11,700 m)
- Wing loading: 65.7 lb/sq ft (321 kg/m^{2})
- Thrust/weight: 0.2041

Armament

- Guns:
  - 2 × 0.50 in machine guns in a remotely operated tail mount, never installed.
  - Planned attack variant: 8 × 0.50 in machine guns in solid nose
- Bombs: 8,000 lb (3,600 kg)

== See also ==
Related development

- Douglas XB-42 Mixmaster

Related lists

- List of bomber aircraft
- List of military aircraft of the United States

== Bibliography ==
- Ginter, Steve (2024). Douglas XB-42 "Mixmaster"/XB-43 "Jetmaster". Air Force Legends. Vol. 229. Steve Ginter Books. ISBN 979-8-9899509-3-5.
- Jones, Lloyd. U.S. Bombers. Fallbrook, California: Aero Publishers, 1974. ISBN 0-8168-9126-5.
- O'Leary, Michael, ed. "America's First Jet Bomber" America's Forgotten Wings, Volume 1, 1994, pp. 66–75.
- Wagner, Ray. American Combat Planes. New York: Doubleday & Company, Inc., 1968. ISBN 0-385-04134-9.
