= Douglas XB-42 Mixmaster =

American experimental bomber aircraft, 1944

XB-42 Mixmaster
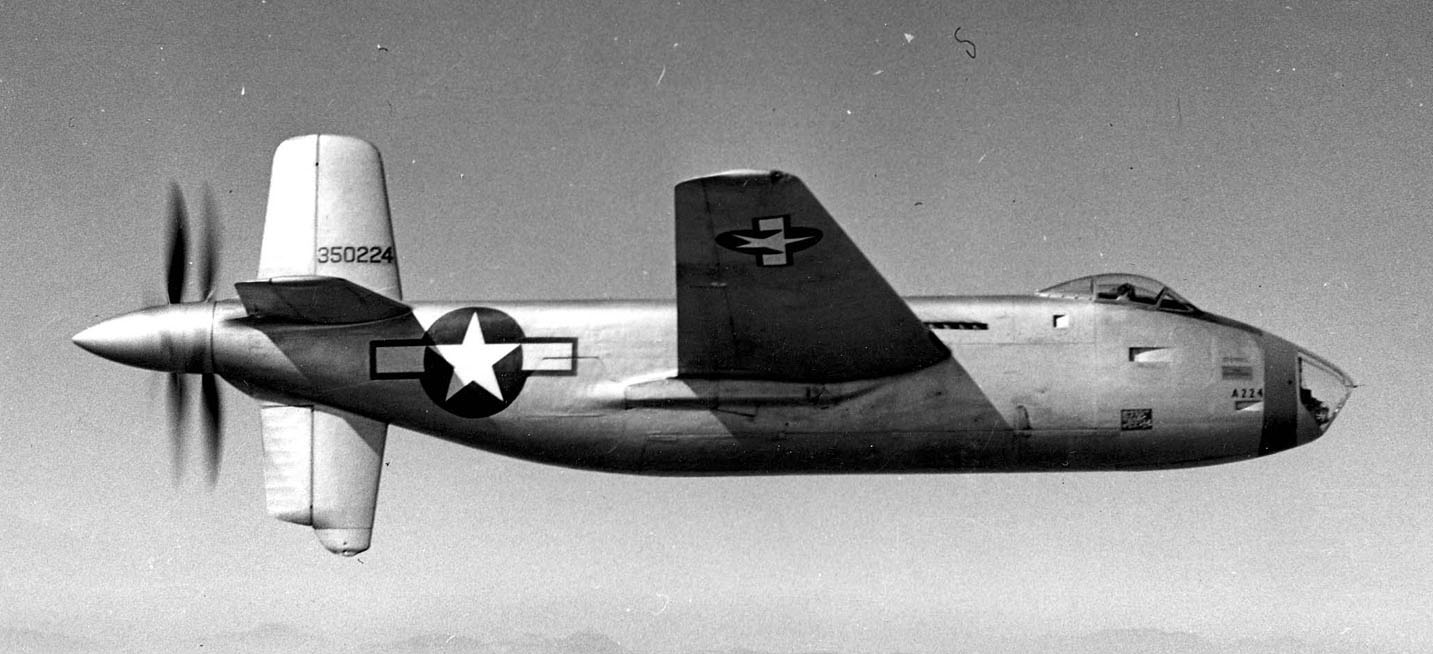
- XB-42

General information
- Type: Medium bomber
- Manufacturer: Douglas Aircraft Company
- Status: Canceled in 1948
- Primary users: United States Army Air Forces (intended) United States Air Force (intended)
- Number built: 2

History
- First flight: 6 May 1944
- Developed into: Douglas XB-43 Jetmaster

The Douglas XB-42 Mixmaster is an experimental American bomber aircraft, designed for a high top speed. The unconventional approach was to mount the two engines within the fuselage driving a pair of contra-rotating propellers mounted at the tail in a pusher configuration, leaving the wing and fuselage clean and free of drag-inducing protrusions.

Two prototype aircraft were built, but the end of World War II changed priorities and the advent of the jet engine gave an alternative way toward achieving high speed.

== Design and development ==
The XB-42 was developed initially as a private venture; an unsolicited proposal was presented to the United States Army Air Forces in May 1943. This resulted in an Air Force contract for two prototypes and one static test airframe, the USAAF seeing an intriguing possibility of finding a bomber capable of the Boeing B-29 Superfortress's range without its size or cost.

The aircraft mounted a pair of Allison V-1710-125 liquid-cooled V-12 engines behind the crew's cabin, each driving one of the twin propellers. Air intakes were in the wing leading edge. The landing gear was tricycle and a full, four surface cruciform tail was fitted, whose ventral fin/rudder unit incorporated a tailwheel to prevent the coaxial propellers from striking the ground. The pilot and co-pilot sat under twin bubble canopies, and the bombardier sat in the extreme front behind a plexiglass nose.

Defensive armament consisted of two 0.50 in (12.7 mm) machine guns each side in the trailing edge of the wing, which retracted into the wing when not in use. These guns were aimed by the copilot through a sighting station at the rear of his cockpit. The guns had a limited field of fire (25 degrees left right and +20 -15 in elevation) to the rear, but with the aircraft's high speed it was thought unlikely that intercepting fighters would attack from any other angle.

Two guns were fitted to fire directly forward. Initially ordered as an attack aircraft (XA-42) in the summer of 1943, this variant would have been armed with 16 machine guns or a 75 mm (2.95 in) cannon and two machine guns.

Considering the danger of bailing out and being pushed into the rear propellers, designers installed an explosive arrangement to sever the props from the tailcone in event of an emergency.

== Operational history ==
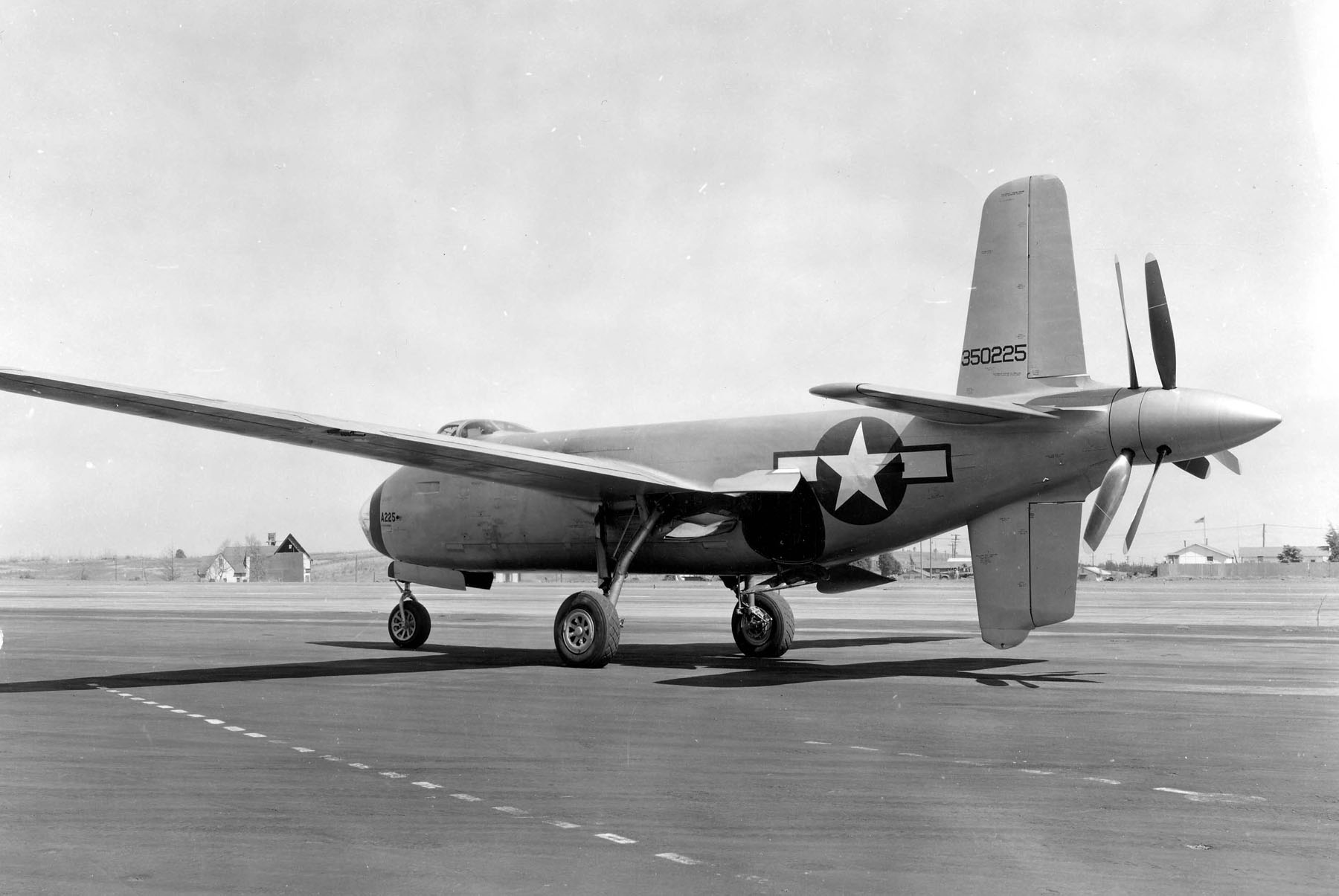
View of the contraprop and cruciform tail.

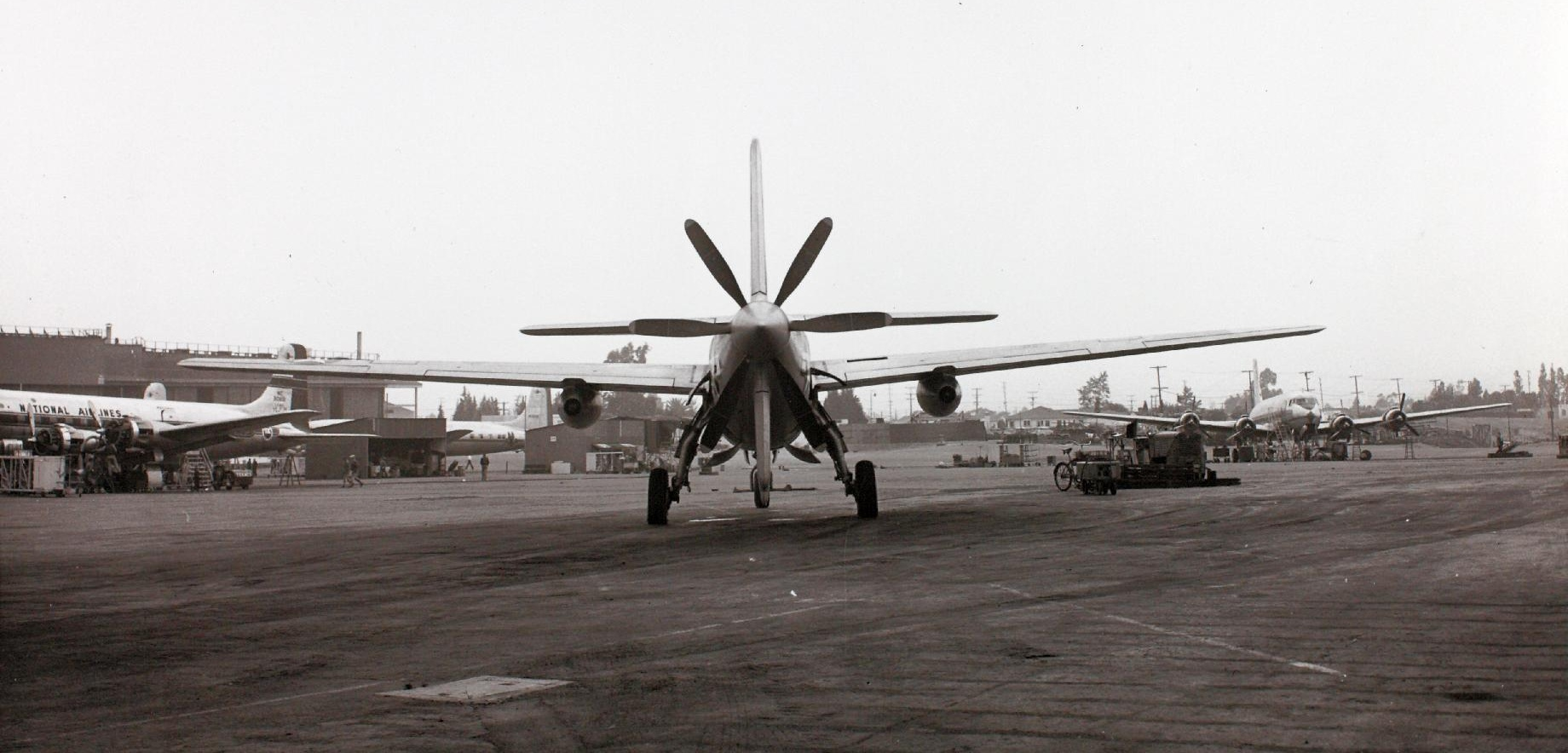
Rear view of the XB-42A in May 1947

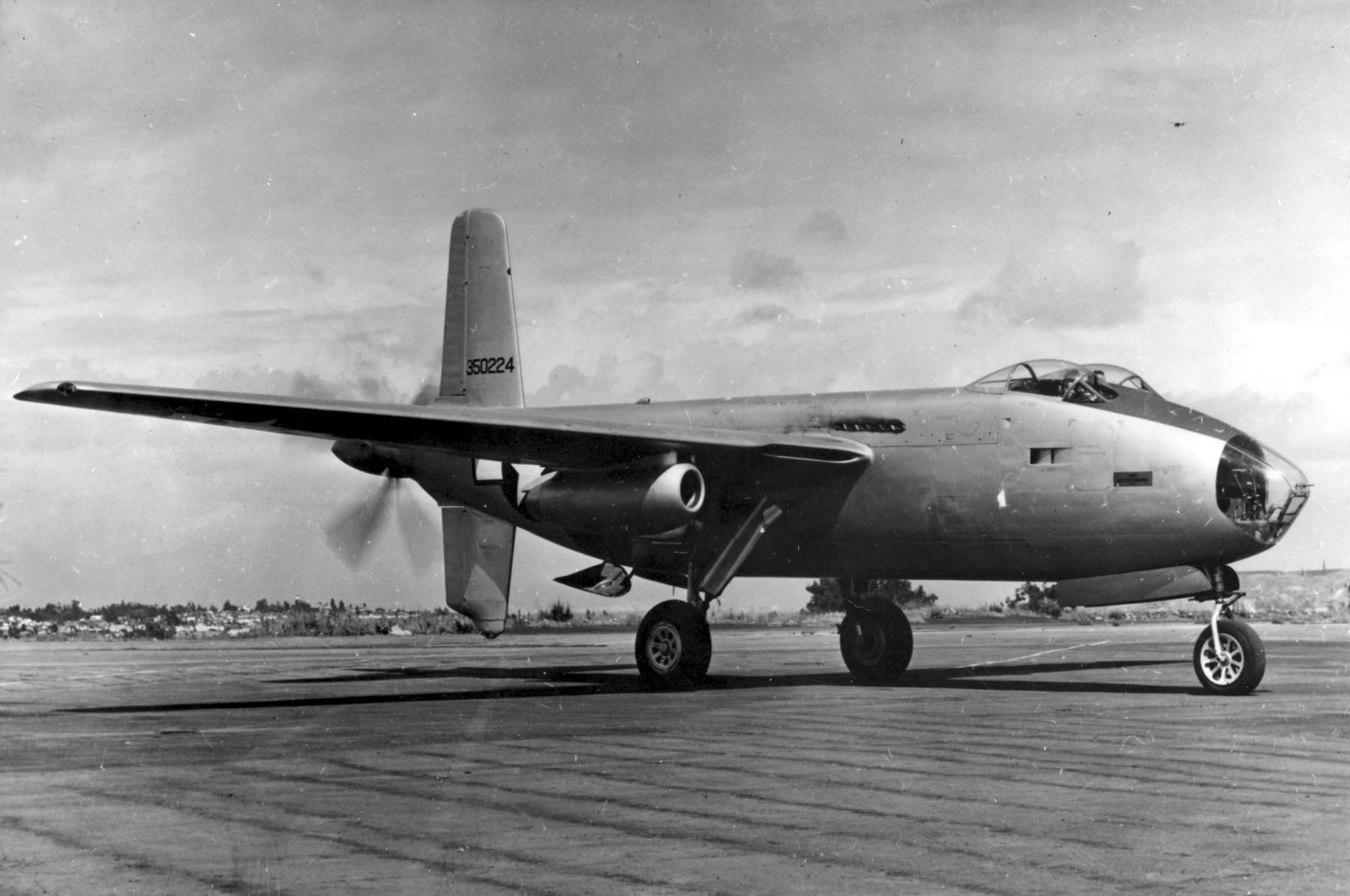
XB-42A with podded 19XB-2 jets.

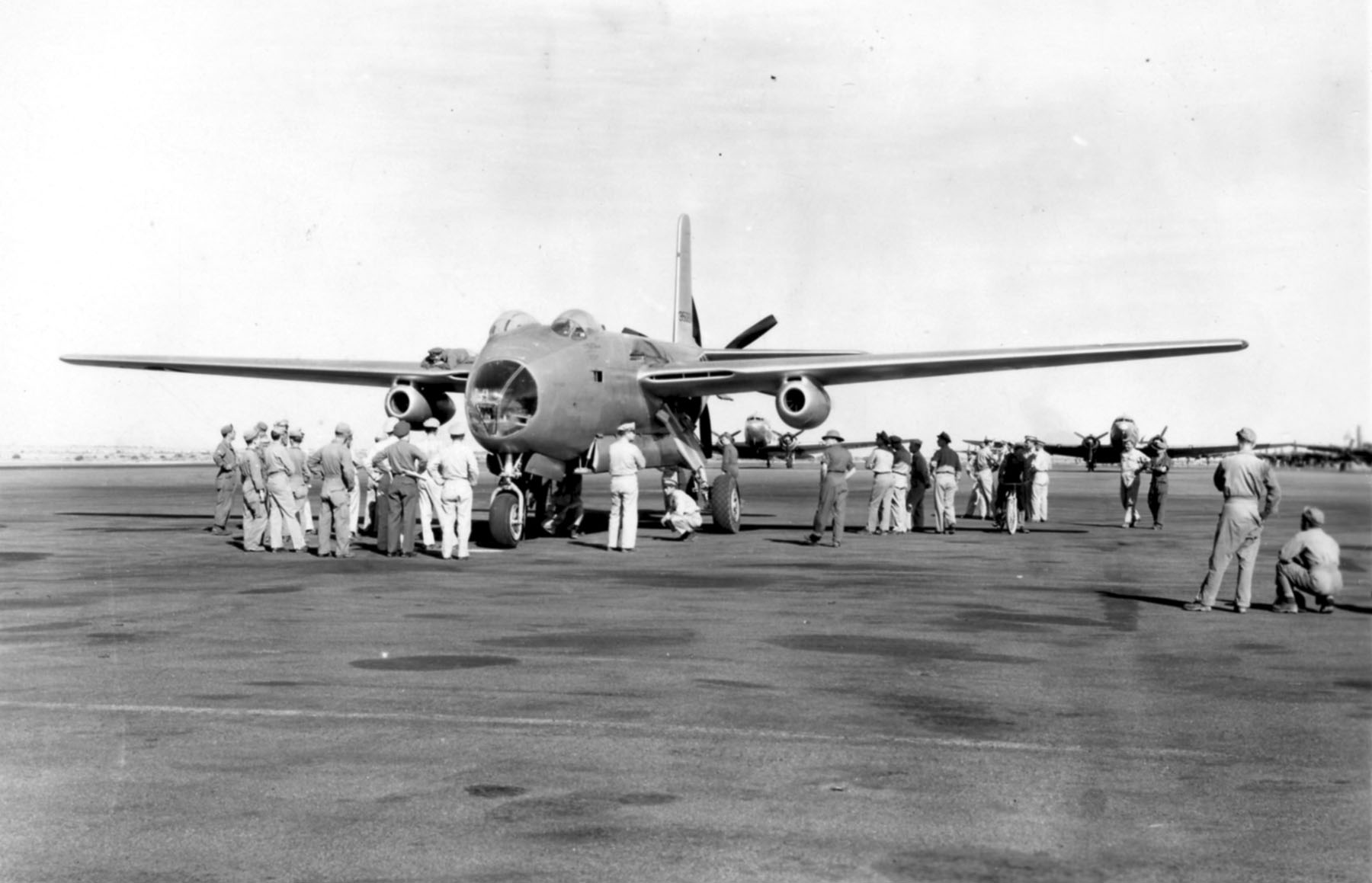
XB-42A

The first XB-42 (43-50224) was delivered to the USAAF and flew at Palm Springs, California on 6 May 1944. Performance was excellent, being basically as described in the original proposal: as fast as the de Havilland Mosquito B.XVI but with defensive armament and twice the bombload over short distances. The twin bubble canopies proved a bad idea as communications were adversely affected and a single bubble canopy was substituted after the first flight of the second prototype.

Testing revealed that the XB-42 suffered from some instability as excessive yaw was encountered, as well as propeller vibration and poor engine cooling - all problems that could probably have been dealt with. Due to the ventral vertical stabilizer and rudder surface set's tip being located underneath the fuselage, careful handling during taxiing, takeoff, and landing was required because of limited ground clearance. An integral shock absorber was added to the ventral fin to reduce excessive bending force in the tailcone from a ground strike.

The end of World War II allowed the USAAF more time to develop new aircraft, and leaders decided to wait for the development of better jet bombers rather than continue with the B-42 program.

In December 1945, Captain Glen Edwards and Lt. Col. Henry E. Warden set a transcontinental speed record by flying the second prototype XB-42 (43-50225) from Long Beach, California to Bolling Air Force Base in Washington, D.C. (c. 2,300 miles). In 5:17 hrs, the XB-42 set a speed record of 433.6 mph (697.8 km/h).

The record-breaking XB-42 prototype was destroyed in a crash on 16 December. On a routine flight out of Bolling Field, Washington, D.C., it suffered in short order: a landing gear extension problem, failure of the left engine, and as coolant temperatures rose, failure of the right engine. Major Hayduck bailed out at 1,200 feet, Lt. Col. Haney at 800 feet, and the pilot Lt. Col. Fred J. Ascani, after crawling aft to jettison the pusher propellers, at 400 feet – all three survived. The aircraft crashed at Oxon Hill, Maryland. The classified jettisonable propeller technology caused a problem for authorities in explaining what witnesses on the ground thought was the aircraft exploding. Possible fuel management problems were speculated, but this hypothesis was never proven by subsequent investigation.

The remaining prototype was used in flight test programs, including fulfilling a December 1943 proposal by Douglas to fit uprated engines and underwing Westinghouse 19XB-2A axial-flow turbojets of 1,600 lbf (7.1 kN) thrust each, making it the XB-42A.

In this configuration, it first flew at Muroc (now Edwards Air Force Base) on 27 May 1947. In testing, it reached 488 mph (785 km/h). After 22 flights, the ventral fin and rudder were damaged in a hard landing in 1947. The XB-42A was repaired but never flew again, and was taken off the USAF inventory on 30 June 1949.

Unit cost was $13.7 million for the program, including the B-43 project.

== Surviving aircraft ==
The first prototype 43-50224 is in storage awaiting restoration in the Restoration Hangar at the National Museum of the United States Air Force in Dayton, Ohio. The prototype was removed from the USAF inventory in 1949 and given to the National Air and Space Museum in Washington, D.C. The wings were removed for transport but have since been lost. In 2010 the fuselage was transferred, along with the Douglas XB-43 Jetmaster, to the National Museum of the United States Air Force. In September of 2026 the aircraft will be displayed in the museum's Experimental Aircraft Hangar for a limited time.

== Specifications (XB-42) ==
Data from Francillon 1979 p. 377

General characteristics

- Crew: three (pilot, co-pilot, bombardier)
- Length: 53 ft 8 in (16.36 m)
- Wingspan: 70 ft 6 in (21.49 m)
- Height: 18 ft 10 in (5.74 m)
- Wing area: 555 sq ft (51.6 m^{2})
- Empty weight: 20,888 lb (9,475 kg)
- Max takeoff weight: 35,702 lb (16,194 kg)
- Powerplant: 2 × Allison V-1710-125 liquid-cooled V12 engines, 1,800 hp (1,300 kW) each

Performance

- Maximum speed: 410 mph (660 km/h, 360 kn) at 23,440 feet (7,140 m)
- Range: 1,800 mi (2,900 km, 1,600 nmi)
- Ferry range: 5,400 mi (8,700 km, 4,700 nmi)
- Service ceiling: 29,400 ft (9,000 m)
- Power/mass: 0.16 hp/lb

Armament

- Guns: 6 × .50 in (12.7 mm) machine guns, two in twin rear-firing turrets and two fixed forward-firing
- Bombs: 8,000 pounds (3,600 kg) in internal bay

== See also ==
- Douglas Cloudster II

Related development

- Douglas XB-43 Jetmaster

Related lists

- List of aircraft of World War II
- List of attack aircraft
- List of bomber aircraft
- List of military aircraft of the United States
