= Dyn'Aéro =

- Industry: Aerospace
- Founded: 1992
- Fate: Out of business
- Headquarters: Pau, France
- Products: Fixed-wing aircraft
- Parent: Groupe AK

Dyn'Aéro was a light aircraft manufacturing company based in Pau, France.

== History ==
Historic logo (from 1992 to 2012)

Dyn'Aéro was founded in October 1992 at Darois, France by the team of three who built the first CR100, with CEO Christophe Robin.

The company was notable for its MCR series of factory built and homebuilt aircraft such as the two seat Dyn'Aéro MCR01. Dyn'Aéro aircraft are all-composite, carbon fibre, light aircraft based on the aluminum Colomban MC-100 original design of Michel Colomban. The aircraft were supplied either as an amateur-built kit or, optionally, ready-built, where local regulations allowed.

The company went bankrupt in January 2012 and was sold to Groupe AK on 1 March 2012.

The company relocated from Darois to Pau in August 2013 but ceased its activities in 2017.

== Aircraft ==
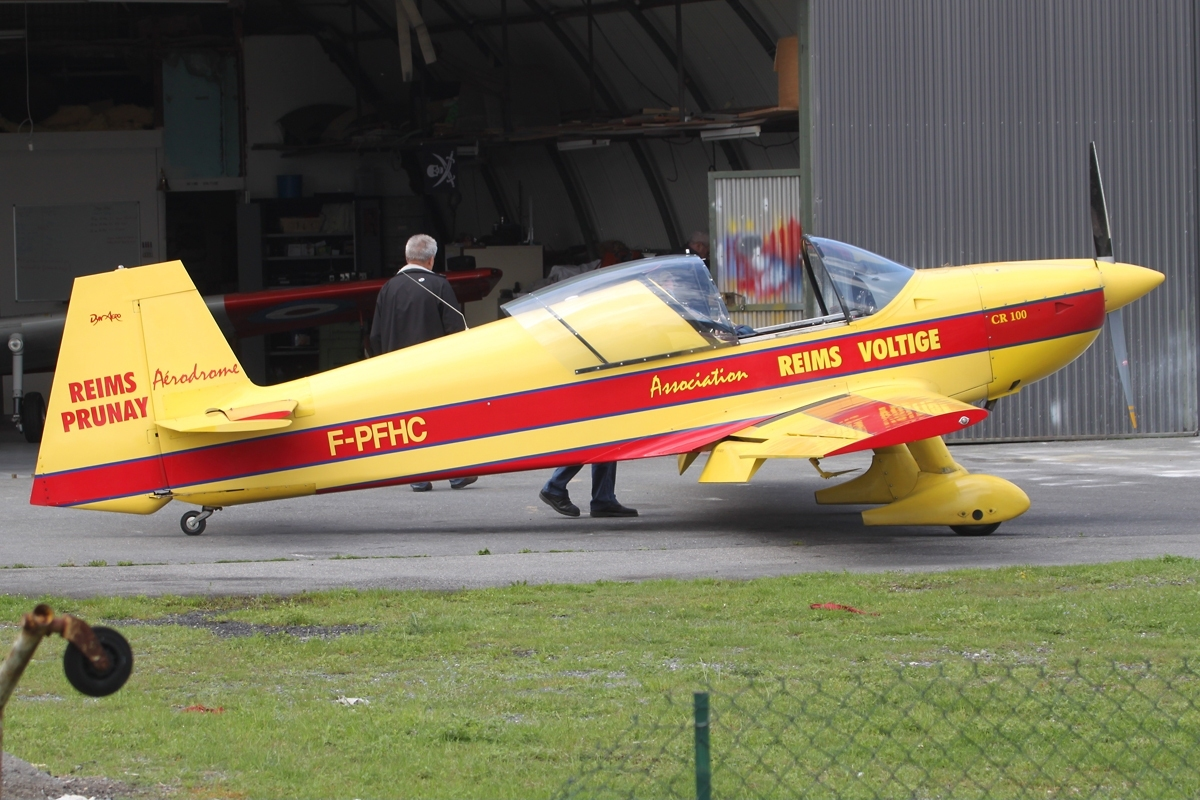
Dyn'Aéro CR100

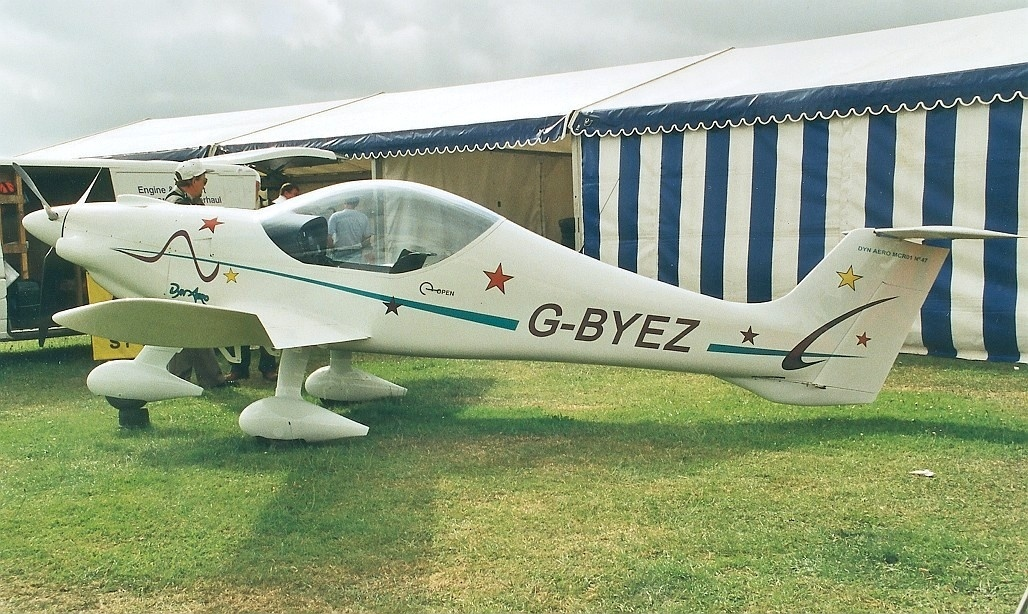
Dyn'Aéro MCR01 'VLA'

- Dyn'Aéro MCR01 (ULC in ultralight category)
- Dyn'Aéro MCR4S (Pick Up in ultralight category)
- Dyn'Aéro CR.100
- Dyn'Aéro CR.110
- Dyn'Aéro CR.120
- Dyn'Aéro R180
- Dyn'Aéro Twin-R
