= Colomban MC-30 Luciole =

French ultralight aircraft

MC-30 Luciole
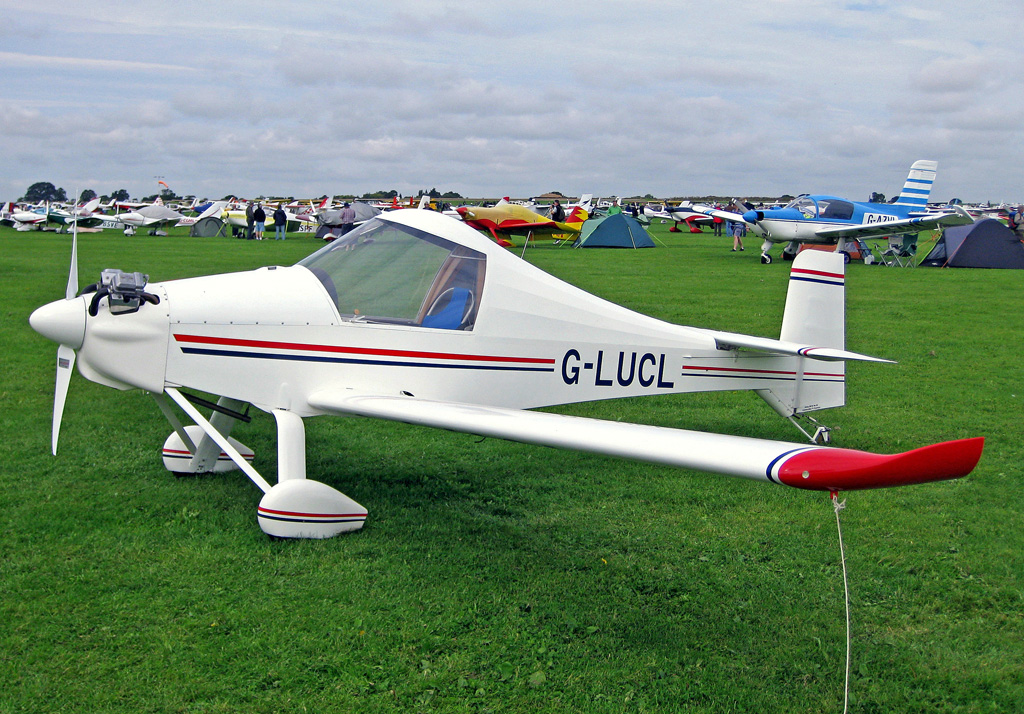
- MC-30 Luciole amateur built in England in 2012

General information
- Type: Homebuilt recreational aircraft
- Designer: Michel Colomban
- Status: Plans available (2015)

History
- First flight: 9 March 2007

The Colomban MC-30 Luciole (English: Firefly) is an ultra-lightweight plans-built single-seat low-wing tail-dragger monoplane, designed by the French aeronautical engineer Michel Colomban, creator of the tiny single-seat Colomban Cri-cri twin-engined aircraft and the MC-100 Ban-Bi two-seat aircraft.

The aircraft is supplied as plans for amateur construction.

== Design and development ==
The Luciole is extremely light, weighing 97 kg (214 lb) empty. It has mixed construction of wood, plywood, metal, foam and glass reinforced plastic. The cantilever wings have foam ribs with a 1 mm plywood skin, sheathed in a thin layer of resin-bonded glass tissue. The Luciole is fitted with a V-Twin Briggs & Stratton four-stroke petrol engine directly driving a 2-bladed Arplast EcoProp 1.16 m (3.8 ft) diameter ground-adjustable propeller. The aircraft is very economical, consuming only 4.5 litres/hour at 150 km/h (93 mph).

== Operational history ==
Although about seven Lucioles have been built in France, only one has been completed in the UK (and half a dozen are under construction), at least one is flying in Germany. The UK aircraft was built under the auspices of the LAA, and to date has logged some 100 hours, flying under a test permit. The Luciole is awaiting full approval from the LAA.

LAA approval was required as the Luciole's wing loading of 43.5 kg/m^{2} was too high to benefit from original UK SSDR microlight sub-category. SSDRs (Single Seat De-Regulated) aircraft had to weigh less than 115 kg (254 lb) without fuel and pilot, and the wing loading could not be more than 10 kg/m^{2}

However, the UK CAA changed the rules in May 2014, and the new SSDR rules state that the aircraft must be single seat, and must have an MTOW of 300 kg, i.e. it must weigh no more than 300 kg at takeoff, including pilot and fuel. Also, the stall speed must be 35 knots or less. There are no other design restrictions.

In a flight test report, Francis Donaldson, the LAA's Chief Engineer, declared that although some design compromises were "clearly not ideal", overall he felt "very impressed with Michel Colomban's new creation", saying the aircraft "performed as claimed, was practical and fun". Donaldson's major criticism was that the elevator's GRP spring (to provide self-centering and to impart "feel") was in the cockpit and not in the tail, so that if the elevator control linkage failed, the aircraft could suffer catastrophic lack of pitch-control as "the Luciole would most likely be totally unflyable". However, Colomban has disclosed plans to "modify the system to relocate the tailplane's self-centering trim spring in the rear fuselage, attaching directly to the tailplane .... so a failure of the (linkage) would no longer be disastrous".

== Variants ==
Colomban MC-30 Luciole
Standard model powered by a Briggs & Stratton four-stroke engine.
Luxembourg Special Aerotechnics MC30E Firefly
Electric aircraft development of the basic design, first flown on 1 August 2011. Powered by 26 hp (19 kW) electric motor running from a 4.7-kWh Kokam battery. The aircraft weighs 113 kg (249 lb) empty and has a 55 minute endurance on a charge. The aircraft has achieved a top speed of 220 km/h (137 mph).

== Specifications (MC-30) ==
Data from Light Aviation

General characteristics

- Crew: 1
- Wingspan: 6.9 m (22 ft 8 in)
- Wing area: 4.6 m^{2} (50 sq ft)
- Aspect ratio: 10.35
- Empty weight: 97 kg (214 lb)
- Max takeoff weight: 200 kg (441 lb)
- Powerplant: 1 × Briggs & Stratton V-Twin four-stroke piston engine, 19 kW (25 hp) Direct Drive
- Propellers: 2-bladed Arplast EcoProp ground-adjustable 1.16 m diameter.

Performance

- Maximum speed: 200 km/h (120 mph, 110 kn)
- Cruise speed: 170 km/h (110 mph, 92 kn)
- Range: 800 km (500 mi, 430 nmi)
- Wing loading: 43.5 kg/m^{2} (9.0 lb/sq ft)
