= Michel Gordillo =

Spanish-French aviator

Miguel Gordillo
- Born: Miguel Angel Gordillo Urquia; 2 May 1955 (age 71); Douala, French Cameroun
- Education: Bachillerato Air Force Career
- Known for: First circumpolar flight in an experimental aircraft less than 1750 kg
- Spouse: divorced
- Awards: Aeronautical Merit, 1998; Silver glider wings
- Aviation career
- Famous flights: Circumnavigational flights: First World Flight: 1998, flown in Kitfox Model IV; Second World Flight: 2001, flown in Dyn'Aéro MCR01
- Flight license: 1973; Madrid Cuatro Vientos
- Air force: Spanish Air Force; 1975–1988
- Rank: Captain

Michel Gordillo is a world record aviator, and the first person to circumpolar navigate the world in an experimental aircraft with a mass of less than 1750 kilograms. He was commander of Iberia Airlines piloting Airbus A319, A320, and A321. In total he has more than 15,000 hours of flight. Gordillo is also a glider pilot, holding the title C silver, and is a member of the Spanish national glider team. He is fluent in Spanish, French and English.

== Life and times ==
Michel Gordillo, born on 2 May 1955 as Miguel Ángel Gordillo Urquia in French Cameroun at Douala near the volcano Mount Cameroon, and lived there until the age of seven. The family moved to the capital, Yaoundé, during the independence movement of Cameroon. In 1967, the family moved to Cannes, France, and then to Madrid, Spain. After he completed the Baccalaureate, he entered the Spanish Air Force Academy selection group after passing a public examination. At present, Gordillo is retired and lives with his family in Spain.

== Career ==
=== Spanish Air Force ===
He gained admission to the Spanish Air Force to train to be a future pilot. At San Javier in Murcia, Spain, he went through military training and after two years started flight training. The first aircraft was a Beechcraft T-34 Mentor, and he flew solo and also received aerobatics training. He flew Beechcraft Bonanza planes and received navigation training (both visual and radio navigation). During his last year at the Academia General del Aire (AGA), he received advanced flight training with T-6 Texan aircraft. Gordillo completed flight training that included formation flying, aerobatics, combat flying and Instrument Flight Rules (IFR) flying. He received the fighter pilot aptitude, but took slot 20 of 24 and the fighter school only took the first 18 slots. Next came IFR multiengine training for one year at Salamanca where he flew the Spanish designed CASA C-212 Aviocar airplane. Gordillo was then assigned to the P3 Orion anti-submarine warfare aircraft. (Note: in Spain the P-3 Orion is assigned to the Air Force, not the Navy.) He became a fighter pilot, but was assigned as a ship and submarine fighter pilot. He flew the P-3 for seven years and became a crew leader. This is where he learned the challenges of locating someone in the water, as he also served in search and rescue aircraft and maritime patrol aircraft capacities. This experience would later serve him for his long distance oceanic flights. While assigned to the P-3 squadron, Gordillo received orders for one year to attend undergraduate and advanced navigator training with the U.S. Air Force at Mather Air Force Base in Sacramento, California. After his P-3 Orion assignment, he was transferred to the 45th Air Force Group. The Group is responsible for transporting VIP people, like the King of Spain and his family, government ministers and dignitaries, and other government officials. Gordillo flew the Falcon 20 aircraft. Gordillo made the decision to retire rather than advance to major in the Air Force and receive an assignment as a desk jockey rather than a flight jockey.

=== Iberia Airlines ===
In 1987, Gordillo went to work for Iberia Airlines and flew the DC-9, as copilot. Then he moved up to the MD-87 aircraft for Iberia and was trained at Los Angeles. Next came long range aircraft, the four engine Airbus A340 for flights from Miami. In 1998, he was promoted to captain, and assigned to fly the twin engine Airbus A320, and later, Airbus A319 and Airbus A321. Gordillo retired at the age of 58.

==== Iberia incident ====
On 5 January 2006, acting as captain of Flight 161 of Iberia Airlines, Gordillo refused to take off for safety and security reasons due to faulty fire detector that had not been repaired. This resulted in his termination. During the judicial proceedings that ensued, a hearing was held on 22 June 2006 and his dismissal was declared inadmissible. However, by 15 November 2006, Gordillo was not reinstated to Iberia Airlines.

== Aircraft ==
=== Model aircraft ===
As a boy, Gordillo was given a control line Air Cobra airplane, with a .049 engine. Unfortunately, he was never able to start the engine. Gordillo bought his first magazine: Le modèle reduit d´avion, a model aircraft magazine. The magazine changed his life and set the course for his calling in life. The magazine remains in his possession. Gordillo developed an interest in model airplanes, first with U-Line models, with .15 engines (combat and aerobatics). He entered the Aeromodelling School. He moved on to free flight models. First gliders and then powered models called FAI F1C (International Aeronautics Federation: F1 stands for free flight and C fuel powered engines) He also flies F1B, rubber powered models. After he completed the Baccalaureate, he entered the Spanish Air Force Academy selection group after passing a public examination. Gordillo spent one year at Granada waiting for a chance to become an Air Force pilot.

=== Gliders ===
While in the Spanish Air Force, Gordillo was able to attend glider school at Jerez. Gordillo received his initial glider instruction at Monflorite in Huesca, Spain. He flew the Blaník type glider for three or four flights and then upgraded to the Pirate type glider. For flight number 8 he flew for 5.5 hours and qualified for Silver C. On flight 9 he achieved Silver C distance and altitude and finally flew for flight number 10, to actually receive the C glider rating together with the Silver C glider rating, something that no one had ever achieved in Spain.

=== Kit planes ===
Ever since Gordillo was in the Air Force Academy, he wanted to build his own airplane. Not until he became a commercial airline pilot was Gordillo able to build his first real aircraft, the Denny Kitfox IV. The Kitfox was powered by an 80-horsepower (60 kW) Rotax 912. A good aircraft to fly slow and low. The next plane he built was a Dyn'Aéro MCR01 aircraft with a Rotax 912S engine. The most recent aircraft built was a Van's Aircraft RV-8.

== Circumnavigational flights ==
=== Madosh ===
The idea of "Madosh" (a portmanteau of the Madrid to Oshkosh flight) came about in 1996, since Gordillo wanted to fly into Oshkosh, Wisconsin for EAA AirVenture Oshkosh. Oshkosh is known as the Mecca of experimental aircraft builders. His plan was to take a different approach and fly eastward, into the sun, instead of flying west, from Spain. The Spanish Air Force and Iberia Airlines provided him support and sponsorship, and the dream became reality in 1998.

=== Into the Sunrise ===
His next project was to build a Dyn'Aéro MCR01 aircraft with a Rotax 912S engine. The flight plan this time called for another around the world flight and was called "Into the Sunrise." Iberia Airlines and the Spanish Air Force provided support and sponsorship for the flight in 2001. Gordillo flew east from Madrid and arrived in Oshkosh safely.

=== Sky Polaris ===
After taking some time off from building experimental aircraft, in 2003 Gordillo began making plans to build and fly the plane of his dreams, a Van's Aircraft RV-8. The project had three main goals. One goal was to collect atmospheric pollution data over remote area such as the desert areas, oceans, and the Arctic and Antarctic poles where no other small aircraft have previously flown. Another goal was to establish a new record maintained by the Fédération Aéronautique Internationale (FAI), the C-1b record category for flight distance by light aircraft. The final goal was for Gordillo to complete a third circumnavigation in an experimental aircraft, the RV-8. Previous flights were completed in 1998 in a Denney Kitfox Model IV, and then in 2001 in a Dyn'Aéro MCR01. Gordillo utilized an aethalometer to collect samples. The data collected during the flight will be analyzed in a project promoted by the Interuniversity Research Institute of the Earth System in Andalusia and the University of Granada. The object of the study will be to increase the body of evidence and knowledge regarding the role of the solid pollutants in global climate change. Previously Matevž Lenarčič utilized an aethalometer to collect samples during his circumnavigation flight.

==== The aircraft ====
For the circumpolar navigational trek, Gordillo flew a Van's Aircraft RV-8, an experimental aircraft. The RV-8 is a high performance craft with a maximum airspeed of 356 km/h (221 mph). The aircraft is powered by a Superior XP IO-360 engine with 180-horsepower.
