= Dyn'Aéro CR.100 =

French homebuilt aeroplane

CR.100
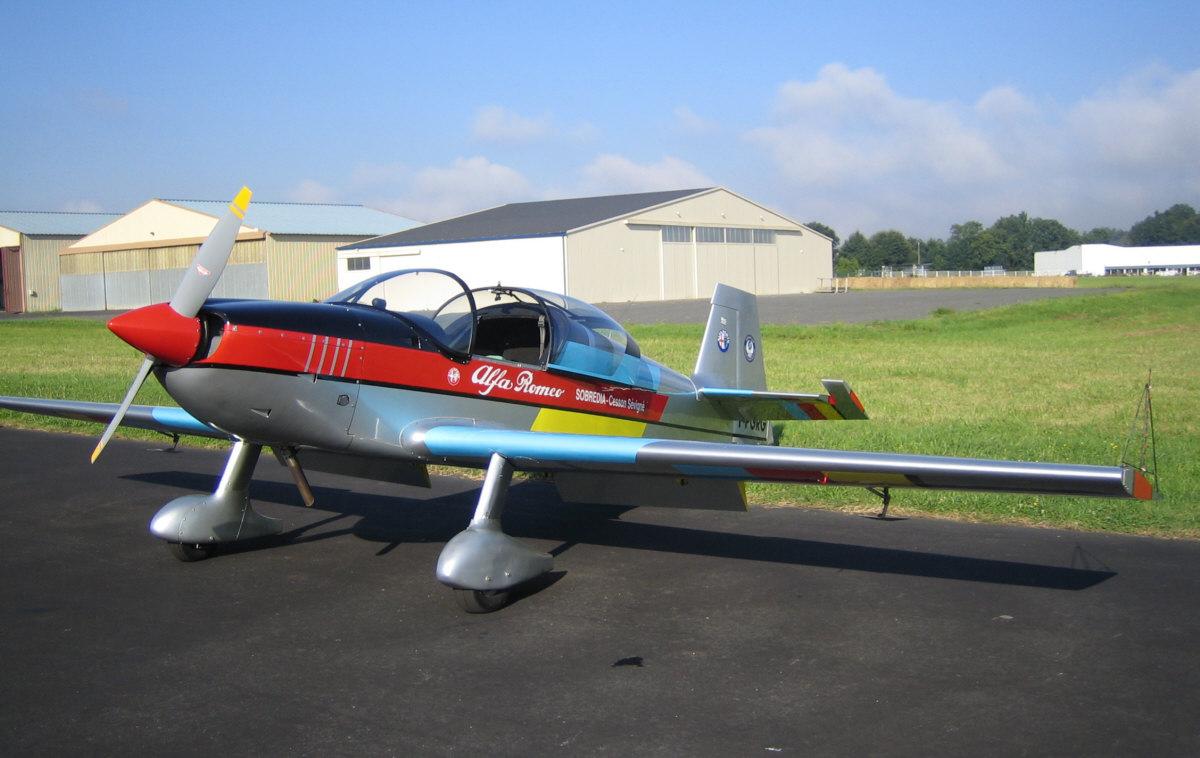

General information
- Type: Tourer and aerobatic trainer
- National origin: France
- Manufacturer: (kit) Dyn'Aéro, Darois
- Designer: Christophe Robin
- Primary user: Aero clubs
- Number built: at least 24

History
- First flight: 27 August 1992

The Dyn'Aéro CR.100 is a French kit built single engine, two-seat monoplane, developed in the 1990s and intended as both an aerobatic trainer and a tourer, primarily for aero club use.

== Design and development ==
The CR.100 was designed by Christophe Robin to provide a two-seater that could both provide competitive aerobatic training and be used as a tourer. Suitability for club use, particularly low cost and maximum utility, were prime considerations. It is produced in kit form for home assembly.

The CR.100 is a conventional single engine, low-wing monoplane, with the large control surface areas and absence of dihedral expected in an aerobatic aircraft. The structure is mostly wood and fabric, though the main wing spar is a plywood and carbon laminate composite and carbon covered ply is an option for the wing surfaces. All the flying surfaces are straight edged and tapered. The ailerons take up about 60% of the wing's trailing edge. The ailerons have spades to reduce control loads. The remainder of the wing trailing edge is three-position flaps. The rudder and elevators are horn balanced and there is a fixed rudder trim tab. The width of the flat sided fuselage is determined by the side by side seating arrangement. Full dual controls, including a pair of left hand throttles, are fitted. A sliding bubble canopy covers the cockpit and is faired behind into a raised and rounded fuselage top decking. The wide track main conventional undercarriage has cantilever legs in fairings, with wheels usually in spats. The tailwheel is freely castoring. The CR.100T variant offers the alternative of a tricycle undercarriage.

The CR.100 is powered by a 180 hp (135 kW) Lycoming O-360 flat-4 engine, driving a fixed pitch, two-bladed propeller. The CR.110 variant has a Lycoming engine uprated to 200 hp (150 kW). The CR.120 high agility version is intended to be competitive in the 200 hp class of the Doret Cup and also has the uprated engine. It differs from the CR.110 aerodynamically in having almost full span ailerons and a shorter span to increase the roll rate, at the cost of the flaps, and structurally in having an entirely carbon fibre airframe. The CR.120 was also intended for use as a military trainer. The first flight of the CR.100 was on 27 August 1992. The CR.120 flew in September 1996 and the CR.100T in November 2000.

== Operational history ==
The RC.100 won the Championnat de France II, the national competition for two-seat light aircraft, in 1994 and 1995. By 2001, more than 35 kits had been sold. In 2010 13 CR.100s, 1 CR.100T and 2 CR.120s were on the French civil aircraft register. Two CR.100s flew with the l'Equipe Voltige de l'Armée de l'Air between 1995 and 1997; one of these was later registered in the UK, the other is now a French civilian.

== Variants ==
CR.100
Standard version.
CR.100T
As CR.100 but with tricycle undercarriage.
CR.110
As CR.100 but with uprated engine.
CR.120
As CR.110 but wingspan reduced from 8.50 m to 7.77 m, with full span ailerons, without flaps. Full carbon fibre reinforced wooden airframe. Standard landing gear configuration is conventional with tricycle gear optional.

== Specifications (CR.100) ==
Data from Pilot February 1998 p.9

General characteristics

- Capacity: 2
- Length: 7.1 m (23 ft 4 in)
- Wingspan: 8.5 m (27 ft 11 in)
- Height: 1.8 m (5 ft 11 in)
- Wing area: 10.83 m^{2} (116.6 sq ft)
- Empty weight: 560 kg (1,235 lb)
- Gross weight: 850 kg (1,874 lb)
- Maximum aerobatic weight: 760 kg (1,675 lb)
- Powerplant: 1 × Textron Lycoming AEIO-360-B2F 4-cylinder horizontally opposed, 130 kW (180 hp)
- Propellers: 2-bladed fixed pitch

Performance

- Maximum speed: 316 km/h (196 mph, 171 kn)
- Cruise speed: 260 km/h (160 mph, 140 kn) at 2,500 rpm
- Never exceed speed: 380 km/h (240 mph, 210 kn)
- Range: 480 km (300 mi, 260 nmi)
- g limits: +8/-6
- Roll rate: 195°/s
- Rate of climb: 8 m/s (1,600 ft/min) initial rate
