= Dyn'Aéro R180 =

R180

General information
- Type: Amateur-built aircraft
- National origin: France
- Manufacturer: Dyn'Aéro
- Status: Production completed (2017)

The Dyn'Aéro R180 is a France amateur-built aircraft that was designed and produced by Dyn'Aéro of Darois. When it was available the aircraft was supplied as plans and as a kit for amateur construction.

As of March 2017 the design is no longer advertised as available by the company.

== Design and development ==
The R180 was designed for competition aerobatics and also as a military trainer. It features a cantilever low-wing, low-mounted tailplane, a two-seats-in-side-by-side configuration enclosed cockpit under a bubble canopy, fixed conventional landing gear with wheel pants and a single engine in tractor configuration. A tricycle landing gear version was also designed.

The aircraft is made from wood and carbon fibre. Its 8.72 m (28.6 ft) span wing has an area of 8.31 m^{2} (89.4 sq ft), mounts full-span ailerons and lacks flaps and winglets. The standard engine specified is the 180 hp (134 kW) Lycoming O-360 four-stroke aircraft engine.

== Operational history ==
Reviewers Roy Beisswenger and Marino Boric described the design in a 2015 review as having better control harmony than the Mudry CAP 10.

== Specifications (R180) ==
Data from Tacke

General characteristics

- Crew: one
- Capacity: one passenger
- Wingspan: 8.72 m (28 ft 7 in)
- Wing area: 8.31 m^{2} (89.4 sq ft)
- Empty weight: 470 kg (1,036 lb)
- Gross weight: 750 kg (1,653 lb)
- Powerplant: 1 × Lycoming O-360 four cylinder, air-cooled, four stroke aircraft engine, 130 kW (180 hp)

Performance

- Maximum speed: 342 km/h (213 mph, 185 kn)
- Cruise speed: 301 km/h (187 mph, 163 kn)
- Stall speed: 93 km/h (58 mph, 50 kn)
- Rate of climb: 8 m/s (1,600 ft/min)
- Wing loading: 90.3 kg/m^{2} (18.5 lb/sq ft)

== See also ==
- List of aerobatic aircraft
