= Alvarez Polliwagen =

Type of aircraft

Polliwagen
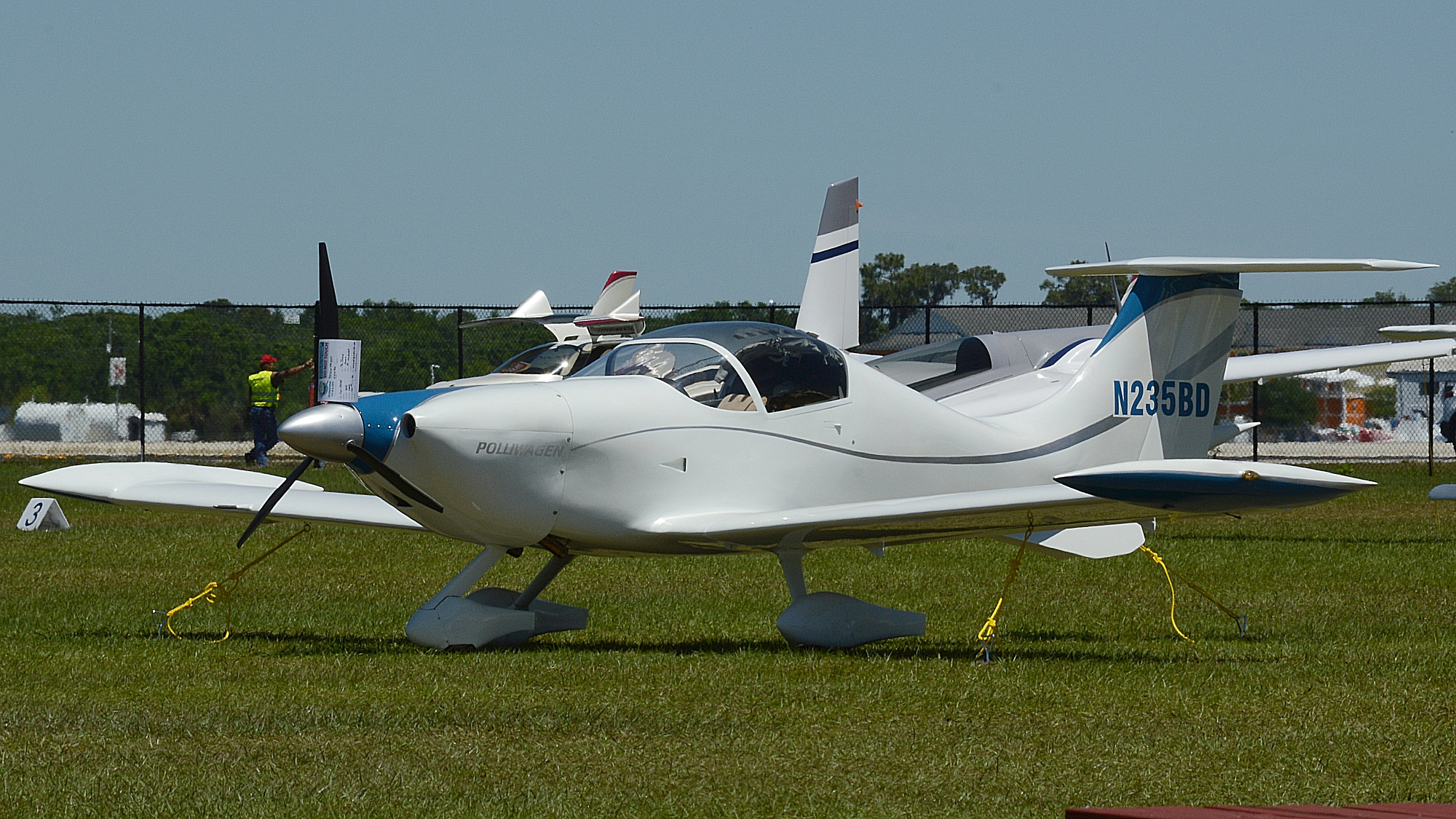

General information
- Type: Homebuilt aircraft
- Designer: Joseph Alvarez

The Alvarez Polliwagen is a 1970s homebuilt aircraft. The aircraft has a combination of many high performance features not typically found in a Volkswagen air-cooled engine-powered homebuilt.

== Design and development ==
The Polliwagen is a low wing, side-by-side configuration, T tailed, tricycle landing gear equipped aircraft with tip tanks. The aircraft was developed and tested with a one quarter scale radio controlled model. Ailerons and flaps are full span. The fuselage is built from composites with foam cores. The aircraft's engine is configured with a constant speed propeller. Entrance is through a swing up canopy.

== Specifications (Polliwagen) ==
Data from Plane and Pilot

General characteristics

- Crew: 1
- Capacity: 1 passenger
- Length: 18 ft (5.5 m)
- Wingspan: 26 ft (7.9 m)
- Airfoil: Wortmann FX-67-K-150
- Empty weight: 950 lb (431 kg)
- Gross weight: 1,550 lb (703 kg)
- Fuel capacity: 26 U.S. gallons (98 L; 22 imp gal)
- Powerplant: 1 × lyc.0-235 L2c horizontally opposed piston, 115 hp (86 kW)
- Propellers: 3-bladed two-position constant-speed Airmaster Composite propeller

Performance

- Maximum speed: 220 kn (250 mph, 400 km/h)
- Cruise speed: 160 kn (180 mph, 290 km/h)
- Stall speed: 33 kn (38 mph, 61 km/h)
- Range: 1,000 nmi (1,200 mi, 1,900 km)
- Service ceiling: 13,000 ft (4,000 m)
- Rate of climb: 1,400 ft/min (7.1 m/s)
- Wing loading: 14 lb/sq ft (68 kg/m^{2})

== See also ==
Aircraft of comparable role, configuration, and era

- Colomban MC-100
- Dyn'Aéro MCR01
- Lancair 320
