= Dyn'Aéro MCR4S =

Type of aircraft

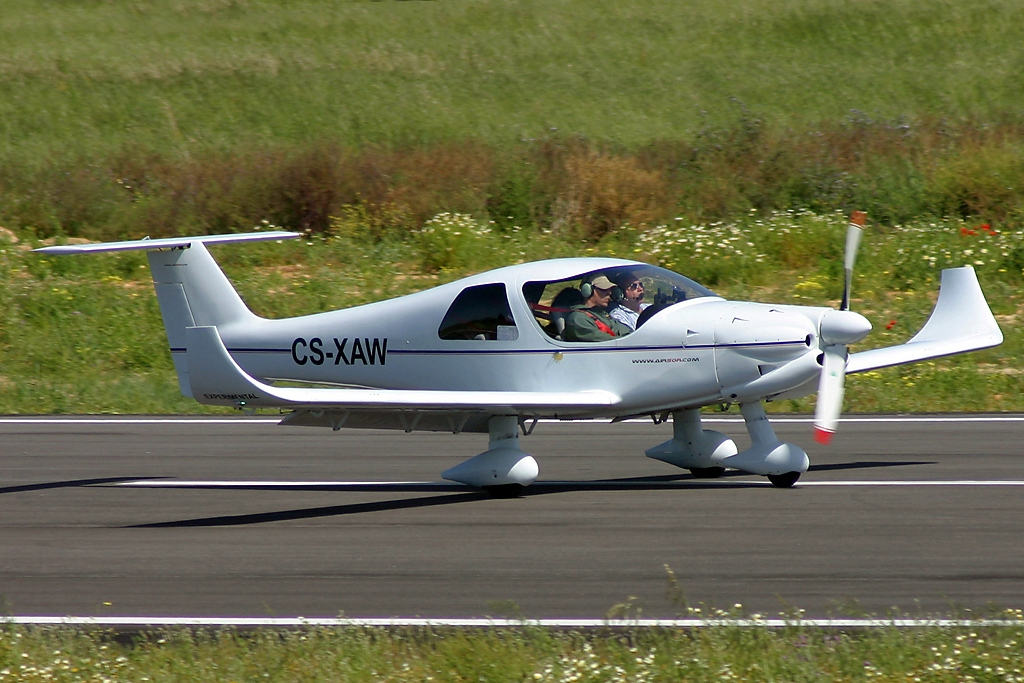

General information
- Type: 2/4 seat kitbuilt ultralight
- National origin: France
- Manufacturer: Dyn'Aéro
- Status: In production (2015)

History
- First flight: 14 June 2000
- Developed from: Dyn'Aéro MCR01
- Variant: Dyn'Aéro Twin-R

The Dyn'Aéro MCR4S is a four-seat development of the French two seat, single engine Dyn'Aéro MCR01. It first flew in early 2000 and is sold as a kit for homebuilding in several versions by SE Aviation of Pontarlier.

== Design and development ==
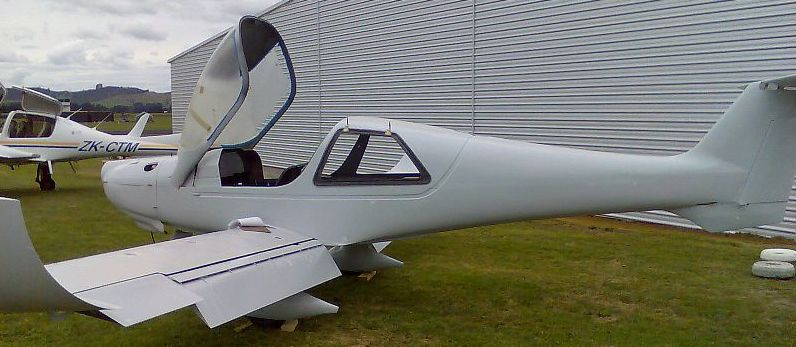
A Dyn'Aéro MCR4S under construction

The MCR4S is a four-seat development of the Dyn'Aéro MCR01 and retains many similarities. Both types are low wing, single engine monoplanes with T-tails. The major changes are an increase in fuselage length to accommodate an extra row of seats with generous windows and the replacement of the flaperons seen on the long span variants of the MCR01, which have wings of about the same span as those of the MCR4S, with slotted flaps.

The wing and all control surfaces of the MCR4S have carbon fibre spars and ribs, to which preformed aluminium skins are glued. The wings have constant chord and carry 3° of dihedral. The ailerons are short, leaving the rest of the trailing edge of each wing divided between two double slotted, three position flaps. Winglets were introduced in 2001 and modified to have straight (in plan) trailing edges from 2002. The MCR4S has a T-tail with an all-moving tailplane. The fin is an integral part of the carbon fibre monocoque fuselage shell which also features a small ventral fin.

The cabin seats up to four, depending on the variant, in two side-by-side rows. Entry is via the large, forward hinged, two piece canopy. Two large windows light the rear seats, the port side one doubling as an emergency exit. A variety of Rotax flat four engines may be fitted, driving a two or three blade propeller, which may have fixed or variable pitch. The MCRS4 has a tricycle undercarriage. The main wheels are mounted on short, vertical legs beneath the wings, as on the Club and ULC variants of the MCR01, with a track of 2.33 m (7 ft 8 in). All undercarriage wheels and legs are faired.

The Dyn'Aéro MCR4S flew for the first time on 14 June 2000.

The MCR4S structure has been used by EADS Defence & Security for its EADS Surveyor 2500 drone.

== Operational history ==
The first public appearance of the MCR4S was at the International Air Rally held at Cranfield just nine days after the first flight. French certification was gained in June 2001 (DGAC) and the first customer, aircraft designer Pierre Robin, flew his aircraft shortly afterwards. UK certification (LAA), though sought, had not been achieved by 2009.

In mid-2010, 90 MCR4Ss appeared on the civil aircraft registers of European countries excluding Russia.

== Variants ==
Data from Jane's All the World's Aircraft 2011/12

Current (2010) versions are based on the MCRS4S-2002 specification.

MCR4S evolution
Powered by the new Rotax 915 iS engine and developed by SE Aviation in Pontarlier, France.

MCR2S Ibis
Two seat configuration with large baggage volume. Rotax 912 engine.

Pickup
Two seat, lightened to 290 kg (639 lb) empty, to produce a microlight aircraft with two seats, maximum internal capacity and performance. Rotax 912UL or ULS engines of 80 to 100 hp (60 to 75 kW).

Three seat
Three seat, powered by a 60 kW (80 hp) Rotax 912 UL or JPX 4TX75 engine.

Four seat
Four seat, powered by a 74 kW (99 hp) Rotax 912 UL-S engine.

Four seat Performance
Four seat, powered by an 85 kW (113 hp) Rotax 914 UL engine.

CITEC
Powered by a Wilksch-120 90 kW (120 hp) two stroke, three cylinder diesel engine.

Dyn'Aéro Twin-R
Twin engine version, first flown March 2011.

MRC ULC
Version lightened to 230 kg (507 lb) empty weight, with tricycle landing gear and powered by an 80 hp (60 kW) Rotax 912 UL or 100 hp (75 kW) Rotax 912 ULS powerplant. The aircraft has a cruise speed of 250 km/h (155 mph) with the 80 hp (60 kW) engine.

MRC M
Version of the MRC ULC with conventional landing gear and powered by an 80 hp (60 kW) Rotax 912 UL or 100 hp (75 kW) Rotax 912 ULS powerplant.

== Specifications (Four seat Performance) ==
Data from Jane's All the World's Aircraft 2011/12

General characteristics

- Capacity: 4
- Length: 6.72 m (22 ft 1 in)
- Wingspan: 8.66 m (28 ft 5 in)
- Height: 1.95 m (6 ft 5 in)
- Wing area: 8.15 m^{2} (87.7 sq ft)
- Empty weight: 370 kg (816 lb) unequipped
- Max takeoff weight: 750 kg (1,653 lb) ; will be as high as 820 kg with Rotax 914 or 915
- Fuel capacity: 120 L (200L with long range fuel tanks
- Powerplant: 1 × Rotax 914 UL flat four piston engine, turbocharged, air and water cooled, driving constant speed propeller and optimised for cruise at 3,048 m (10,000 ft), 84.6 kW (113.5 hp) can also be fitted with 912S or 915iS

Performance

- Maximum speed: 250 km/h (160 mph, 130 kn)
- Cruise speed: 230 km/h (140 mph, 120 kn) 5000rpm, 30 inHg (1.0 bar)
- Stall speed: 83 km/h (52 mph, 45 kn) flaps down
- Never exceed speed: 305 km/h (190 mph, 165 kn)
- Range: 2,000 km (1,200 mi, 1,100 nmi) @ economic cruise speed, with long range fuel tanks (200L), with reserves
- g limits: +3.8/-1.5
- Rate of climb: 4.6 m/s (910 ft/min)
