= Colomban MC-100 Ban-Bi =

French homebuilt aeroplane

MC-100 Ban-Bi

General information
- Type: Amateur-built aircraft
- National origin: France
- Designer: Michel Colomban
- Status: Plans available (2011)
- Number built: 22 (1998)

History
- Variant: Dyn'Aéro MCR01

The Colomban MC-100 Ban-Bi is a French amateur-built aircraft that was designed by Michel Colomban. The aircraft is supplied as plans for amateur construction with some parts and sub assemblies available.

The name Ban-Bi combines Ban from the designer's surname, Colomban, and Bi from the French "biplace", meaning two seats.

== Design and development ==
The MC-100 features a cantilever low-wing, a two-seats-in-side-by-side configuration enclosed cockpit under a bubble canopy, a T-tail, fixed tricycle landing gear and a single engine in tractor configuration.

The aircraft's 6.63 m (21.8 ft) span wing has an area of 5.2 m^{2} (56 sq ft). The standard engine used is the 80 hp (60 kW) Rotax 912UL four-stroke powerplant. The design is noted for its high speed on low installed power as it has a top level speed of 305 km/h (190 mph) on just 80 hp (60 kW). The cockpit is described by reviewers Roy Beisswenger and Marino Boric as "snug, but adequate"

The aircraft is built from plans. Sub-assemblies and parts are available from both Dyn'Aéro in France and Arplast.

The MC-100 was developed into a whole series of derivative designs, the Dyn'Aéro MCR01 series.

== Specifications (MC-100 Ban-Bi) ==
Data from Bayerl and Aerocrafter

General characteristics

- Crew: one
- Capacity: one passenger
- Length: 5.49 m (18 ft 0 in)
- Wingspan: 6.63 m (21 ft 9 in)
- Wing area: 5.2 m^{2} (56 sq ft)
- Empty weight: 202 kg (445 lb)
- Gross weight: 450 kg (992 lb)
- Fuel capacity: 54 litres (12 imp gal; 14 US gal)
- Powerplant: 1 × Rotax 912UL four cylinder, liquid and air-cooled, four stroke aircraft engine, 60 kW (80 hp)
- Propellers: 3-bladed composite

Performance

- Maximum speed: 305 km/h (190 mph, 165 kn)
- Cruise speed: 270 km/h (170 mph, 150 kn)
- Stall speed: 87 km/h (54 mph, 47 kn)
- Range: 2,309 km (1,435 mi, 1,247 nmi)
- Service ceiling: 5,200 m (17,000 ft)
- g limits: +9/-4.5
- Rate of climb: 10.1 m/s (1,990 ft/min)
- Wing loading: 86.5 kg/m^{2} (17.7 lb/sq ft)

== See also ==
Aircraft of comparable role, configuration, and era

- Dyn'Aéro MCR01
- Alvarez Polliwagen
