= Colomban Cri-cri =

French twin-engined ultra-light aircraft

Cri-Cri
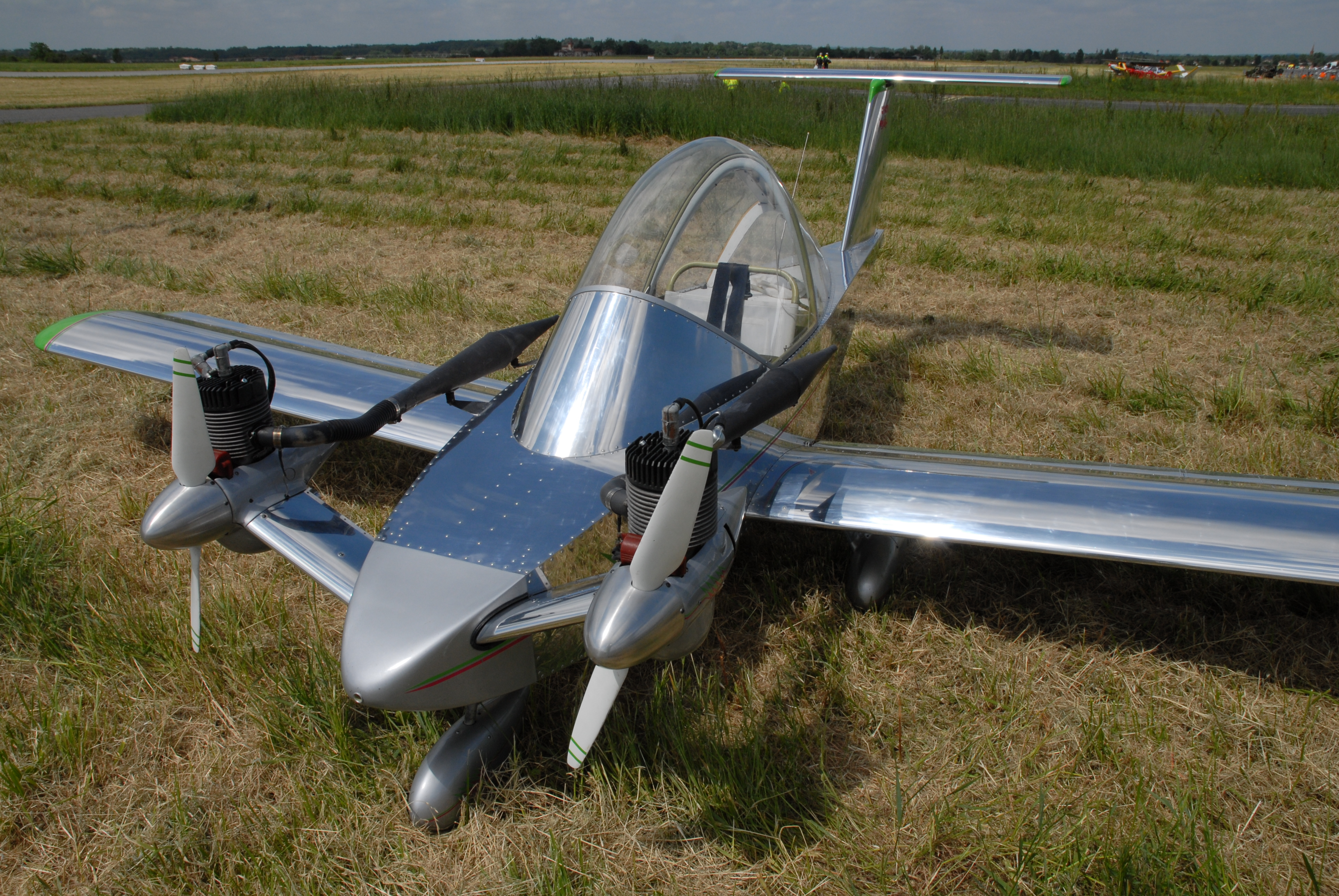
- French-built homebuilt Cri-Cri at Airexpo 2007

General information
- Type: Homebuilt recreational aircraft
- Designer: Michel Colomban

History
- Introduction date: 1973
- First flight: 19 July 1973

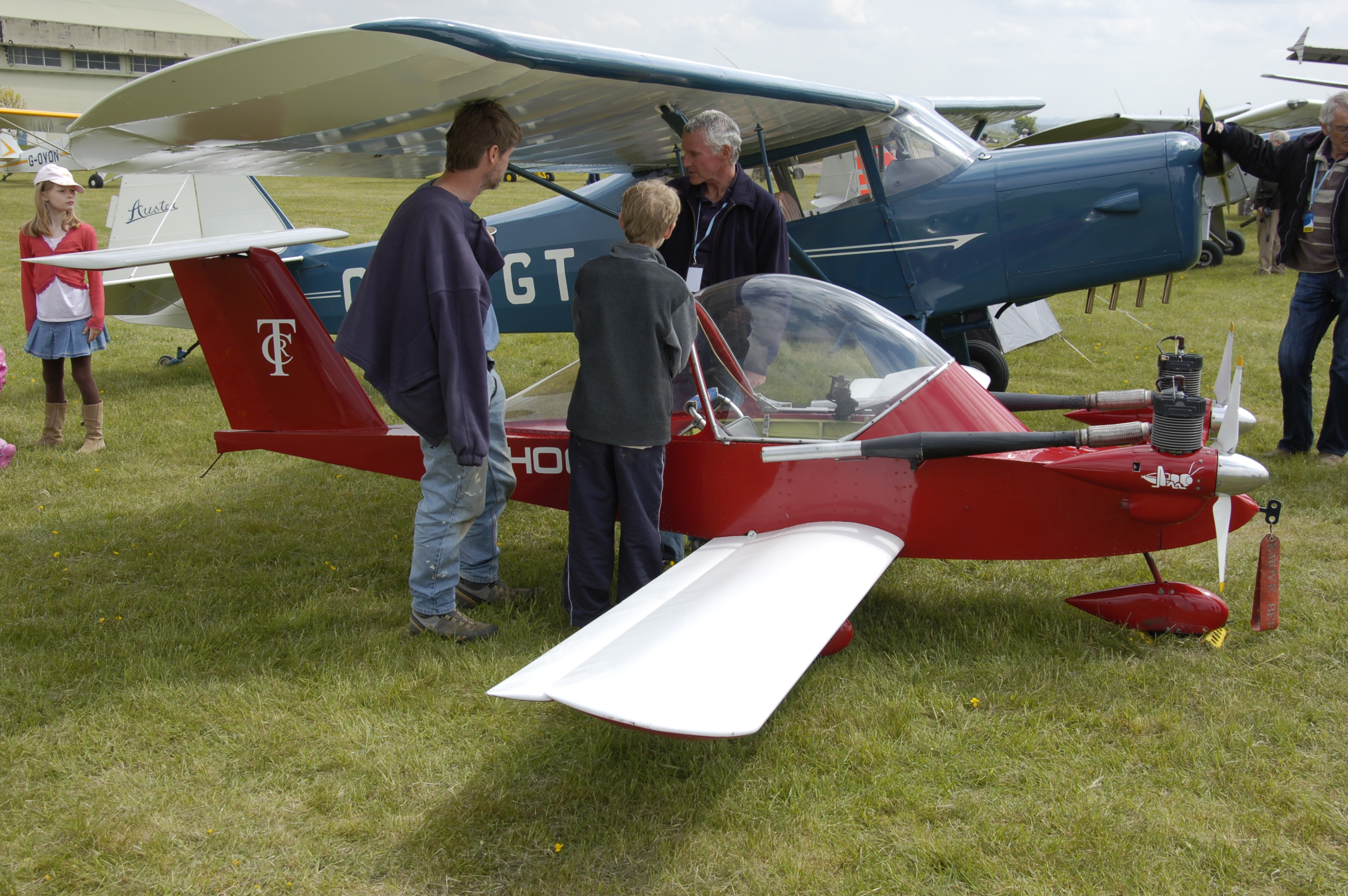
1984 Colomban MC-15 Cri-cri in England

The Colomban Cri-Cri, also spelled Cricri, is the smallest twin-engined crewed aircraft in the world, designed in the early 1970s by French aeronautical engineer Michel Colomban.

The name Cri-Cri comes from the nickname of Christine, one of Colomban's daughters. 'Cri-cri' 'or 'cricri' is also the French term for the sound of a cricket or a cicada, or an informal name for the insects themselves, but it is unclear if this double meaning was intended by Colomban himself.

== Design and development ==
Colomban designed the aircraft to be easy to build and fly, and the closeness of the two engines to each other, around the centreline, meant that it could be flown by pilots only qualified to fly single-engined aircraft because even with the complete failure of one engine, with hands and feet off the controls, the only effect would be a gentle turn. The cockpit canopy was carefully designed to direct effective airflow over the tail surfaces in this situation. The plans-built aircraft was also designed to be easy to store in a garage and tow on a trailer, with assembly and disassembly each taking only five minutes.

The Cri-Cri features a cantilever low-wing, a single-seat enclosed cockpit under a bubble canopy, fixed tricycle landing gear and twin engines mounted on pylons to the nose of the aircraft in tractor configuration. The aircraft is made from aluminum sheet glued to Klegecell foam. Its 4.9 m (16.1 ft) span wing employs a Wortmann 21.7% mod airfoil, and has an area of 3.1 m^{2} (33 sq ft). The aircraft is also capable of aerobatics within the limitations of twin-engined aircraft.

The first flight of the prototype was made on 19 July 1973 and within a few days it had proved to be easy to fly and capable of aerobatics, being stressed to +10g and -5g. It was powered by two Rowena 6507J single cylinder two-stroke engines, each giving 6.7 kW (9.0 hp) and weighing 6.5 kg (14.3 lb).

== Variants ==
MC-10 Cri-Cri
Prototype and early examples
MC-12 Cri-Cri
Model with a cruising speed of 185 km/h (100 knots, or 114.9 miles per hour) and range of 500 km (310.6 statute miles, 270 nautical miles).
MC-15 Cri-Cri
Model powered by two JPX PUL 212 15 horsepower (11 kW) engines.
MC-15 Cri-Cri Jet
Model powered by two PBS VB TJ20 210 newtons (47 lb_{f}) turbojet engines.

== Operational use ==
As with any homebuilt aircraft, the existing Cri-Cri planes have often been modified by their builders, departing from the original design to a varying degree, resulting in varying performance. Most versions can climb with one engine inoperative.

In June 2010, EADS partnered with Aero Composites Saintonge and the Greencri-cri Association to present an electric-powered Cri-Cri at the Green Aviation Show in Le Bourget. The modified airframe with composite components can fly for 30 minutes at 110 km/h. The aircraft uses four brushless electric motors with counter-rotating propellers, which makes the aircraft one of the world's smallest four-engine aircraft.

On September 5, 2010 Electravia accomplished a world record speed of 262 km/h (162.33 mph) for a lithium polymer-powered aircraft using a Cri-Cri with two electric motors (each producing 25 hp) during the attempt. The company claimed engine and cooling drag reductions of 46 per cent versus the conventional combustion engine arrangement.

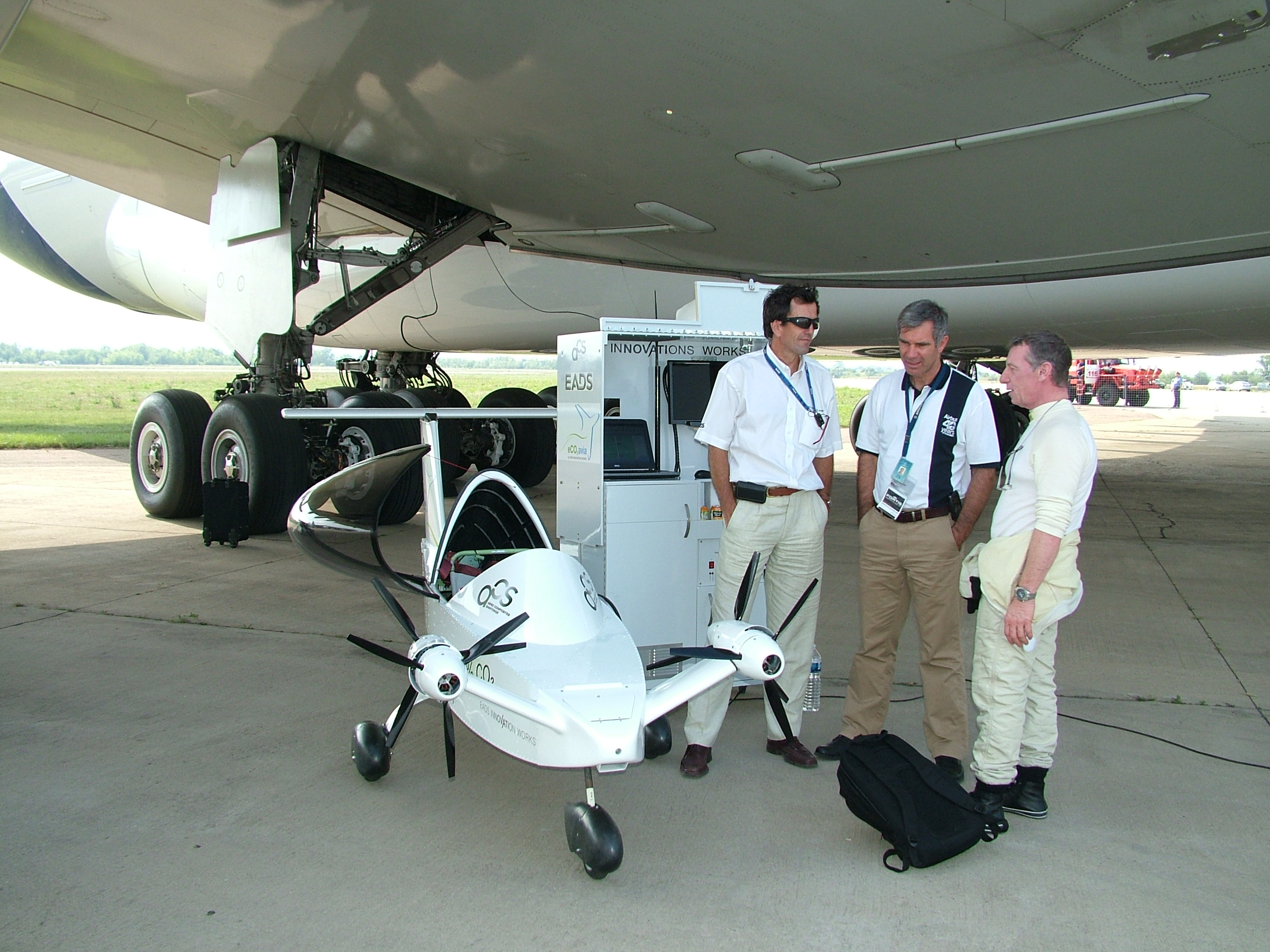
Cri-Cri (F-PRCQ), the first all-electric four-engine aircraft under an Airbus A380 at the 2011 MAKS airshow

On 9 July 2015 the electric-powered Electravia version of the design flew across the English Channel hours before the Airbus E-Fan, becoming the third electric aircraft to do so. It was pulled aloft by another aircraft and did not take off on its own. The first was the MacCready Solar Challenger in 1981 and the second used electric motors powered by hydrogen.

== Specifications (MC 15) ==
Data from Michel Colomban

General characteristics

- Crew: one
- Length: 3.9 m (12 ft 10 in)
- Wingspan: 4.9 m (16 ft 1 in)
- Height: 1.15 m (3.76 ft)
- Wing area: 3.1 m^{2} (33 sq ft)
- Aspect ratio: 7.8
- Airfoil: Wortmann 21.7
- Empty weight: 78 kg (172 lb)
- Max takeoff weight: 170 kg (375 lb)
- Fuel capacity: 23 L
- Powerplant: 2 × JPX PUL 212 single-cylinder piston engines, 11 kW (15 hp) each
- Propellers: 2-bladed

Performance

- Maximum speed: 220 km/h (136.7 mph, 118.8 kn)
- Cruise speed: 190 km/h (120 mph, 100 kn)
- Stall speed: 72–90 km/h (45–56 mph, 39–49 kn) flaps down-up
- Never exceed speed: 260 km/h (160 mph, 140 kn)
- Range: 460 km (290 mi, 250 nmi)
- Service ceiling: 3,700 m (12,100 ft)
- g limits: +4.5 -2.5
- Rate of climb: 6.6 m/s (1,300 ft/min)
- Wing loading: 55 kg/m^{2} (11 lb/sq ft)

== See also ==
Aircraft of comparable role, configuration, and era

- Aerosport Rail
- Beaujon Enduro
- Beaujon Mach .07
