= Van's Aircraft RV-8 =

American kit aircraft

RV-8
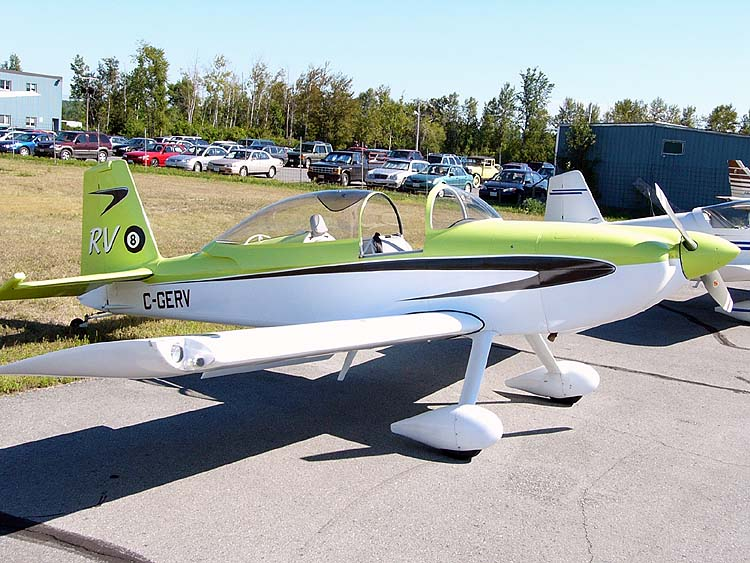

General information
- Type: RV-8
- National origin: United States
- Manufacturer: Van's Aircraft
- Designer: Richard VanGrunsven
- Number built: 1611 (November 2021)

History
- Introduction date: 1995
- First flight: 1995
- Developed from: Van's Aircraft RV-4

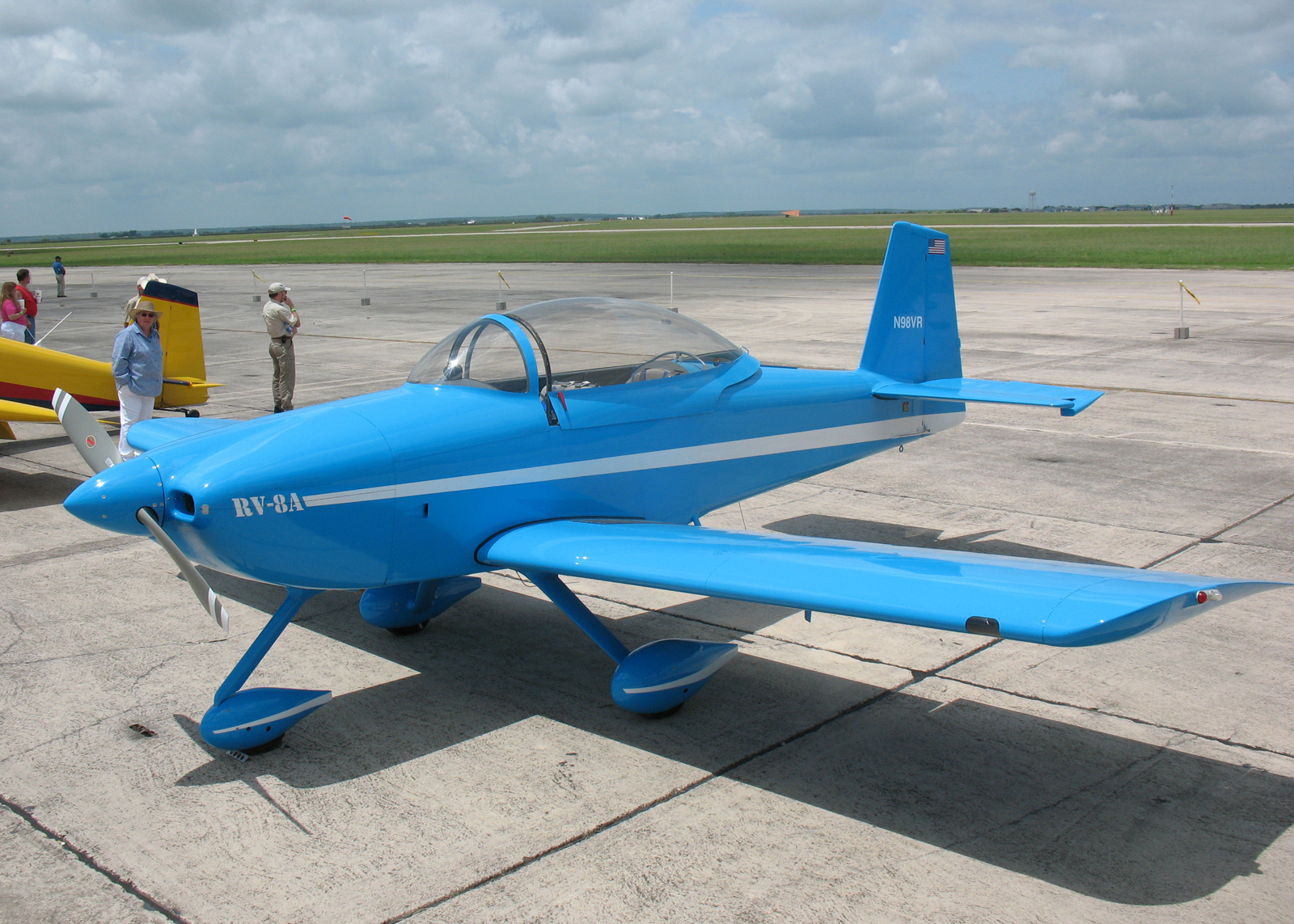
RV-8A at the 2007 South West Regional Fly In, Hondo, TX.

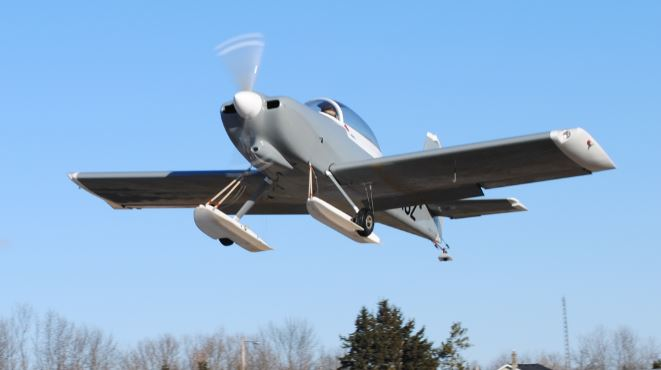
RV-8 on wheel skis in December 2011.

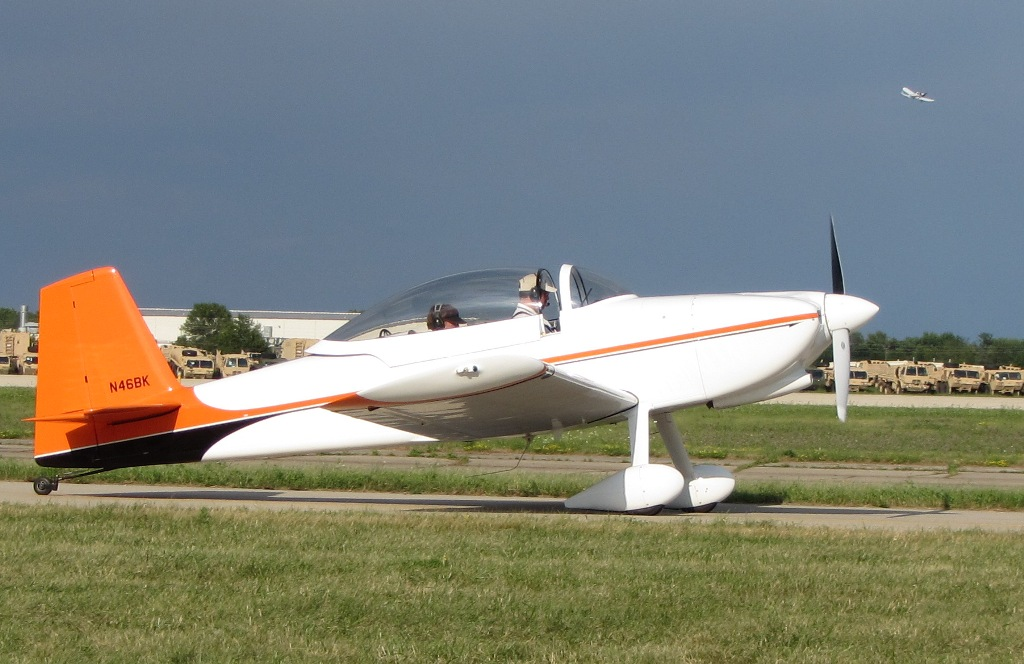
RV-8 at AirVenture 2011.

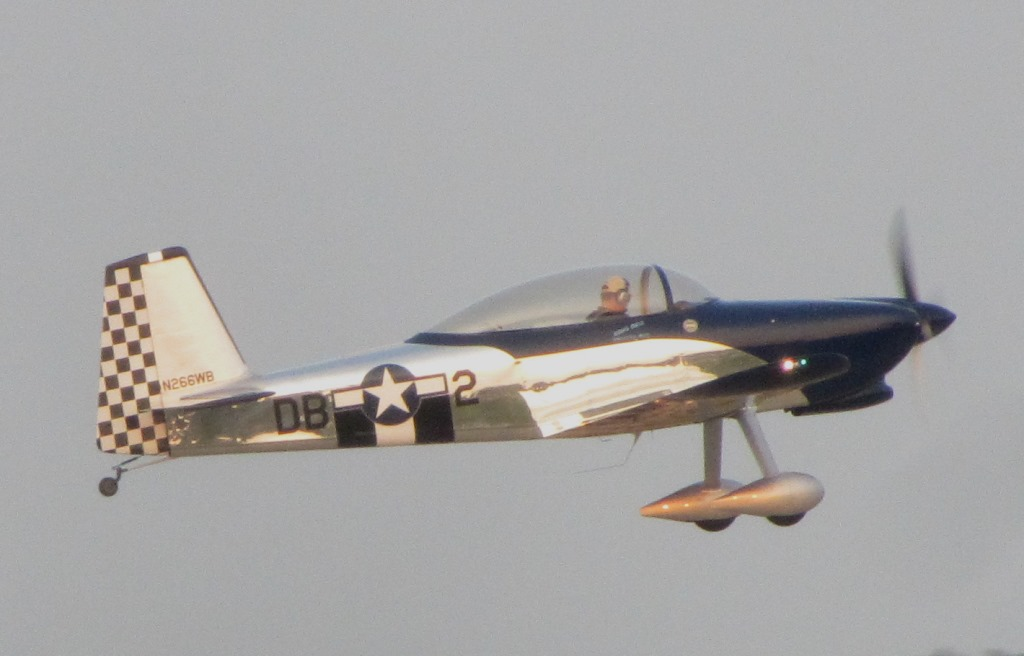
Vans RV-8 takeoff.

The Van's RV-8 is a tandem two-seat, single-engine, low-wing homebuilt aircraft sold in kit form by Van's Aircraft. The RV-8 is equipped with conventional landing gear, while the RV-8A version features tricycle landing gear. The design is similar to the earlier RV-4, although it is larger than that earlier model.

== Development ==
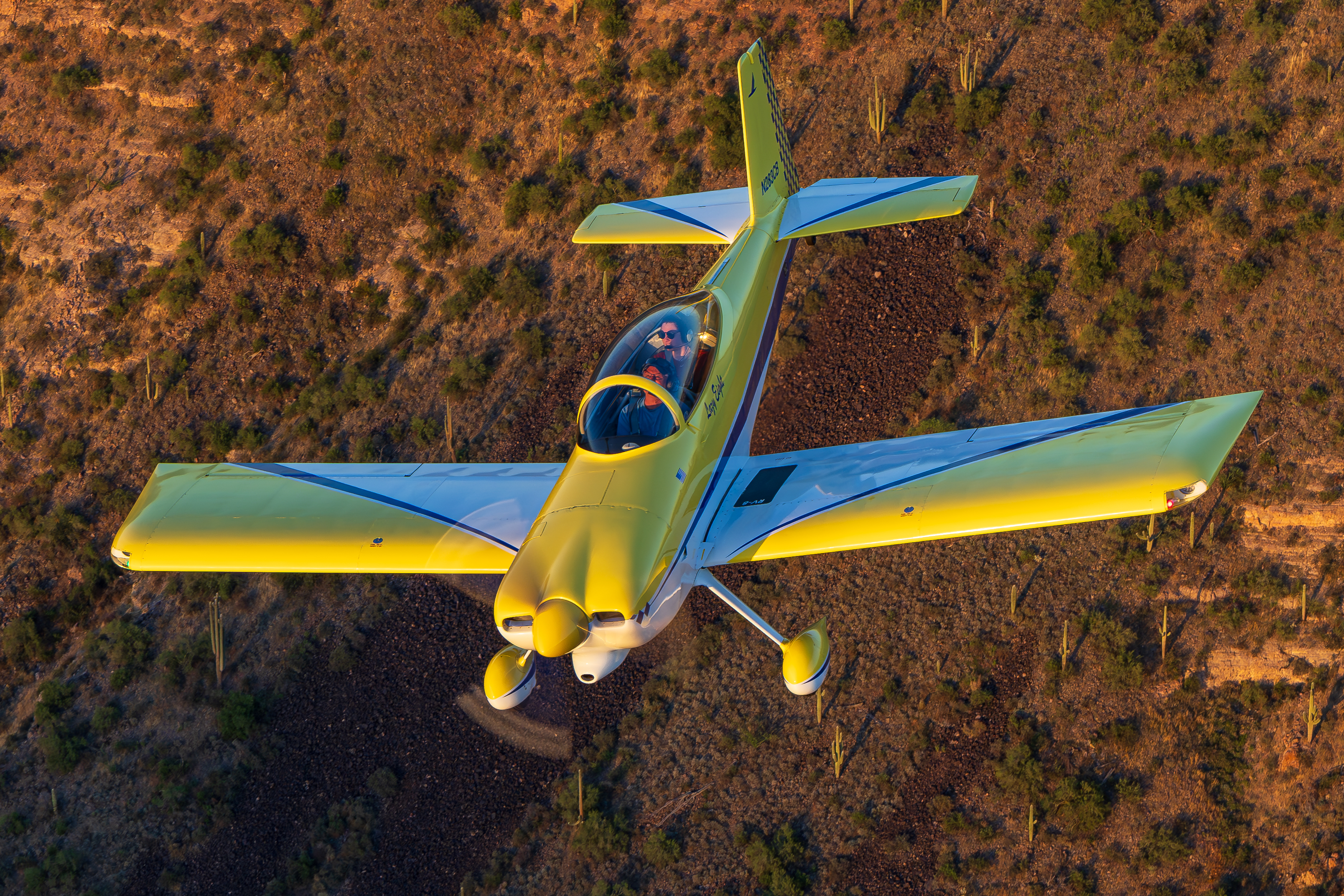
An RV-8 in flight over Arizona, showing the tandem seating and the conventional landing gear that distinguishes it from the RV-8A

Richard VanGrunsven designed the RV-8 series as an updated, larger tandem aircraft based on the RV-4 design concept. The RV-8 first flew in 1995 and was first shown publicly at Oshkosh that year.

The RV-8 incorporated changes as a result of lessons learned in producing the popular RV-4 design. The RV-8 airframe accepts larger engines from 150 to 210 hp (112 to 157 kW), including the 210 hp (157 kW) Lycoming IO-390. The RV-8 also has increased wingspan and wing area over the RV-4, as well as greater cockpit width, headroom, legroom and an increased useful load, all with a view to accommodating larger pilots. Like the RV-3 to RV-7 that preceded it, the RV-8 is stressed for aerobatics.

The RV-8 series was intended from inception to include a nose-gear-equipped version designated the RV-8A. The RV-8A was first flown in 1998

As of November 2022, 1,611 RV-8s and RV-8As have been completed and flown.

== Specifications (RV-8) ==
Data from Van's Aircraft

General characteristics

- Crew: one
- Capacity: one passenger
- Length: 21 ft 0 in (6.40 m)
- Wingspan: 24 ft 0 in (7.32 m)
- Height: 5 ft 7 in (1.70 m)
- Wing area: 116 sq ft (10.8 m^{2})
- Empty weight: 1,120 lb (508 kg)
- Gross weight: 1,800 lb (816 kg)
- Fuel capacity: 42 U.S. gallons (160 L; 35 imp gal)
- Powerplant: 1 × Lycoming IO-360 four cylinder, horizontally opposed piston aircraft engine with fuel injection, 200 hp (150 kW)

Performance

- Maximum speed: 221 mph (356 km/h, 192 kn)
- Cruise speed: 210 mph (340 km/h, 180 kn) at 75% power at 8000 feet
- Stall speed: 58 mph (93 km/h, 50 kn)
- Range: 940 mi (1,510 km, 820 nmi) at 55% power and 8000 feet
- Service ceiling: 22,500 ft (6,900 m)
- Rate of climb: 1,900 ft/min (9.7 m/s)
- Wing loading: 15.5 lb/sq ft (76 kg/m^{2})

== See also ==
Related development

- Van's Aircraft RV-3
- Van's Aircraft RV-4
- Bohannon B-1

Aircraft of comparable role, configuration, and era

- Van's Aircraft RV-4
