= Dyn'Aéro Twin-R =

Twin engine kit-built light aircraft

Twin-R

General information
- Type: Four seat twin engine kitbuilt
- National origin: France
- Manufacturer: Dyn'Aéro
- Designer: Pierre and Christophe Robin

History
- First flight: 3 March 2011
- Developed from: Dyn'Aéro MCR4S

The Dyn'Aéro Twin-R is a twin engine kit-built light aircraft based on the single-engine Dyn'Aéro MCR4S, designed and built in France. Its first flight was in March 2011.

== Design and development ==
The Dyn'Aéro Twin-R is a twin engine development of the four-seat, single-engine Dyn'Aéro MCR4S, with a 580 mm (1 ft 11 in) greater span and increases in tail surface areas. It was originally intended that it should be built from drawings but changes to French multi-engine aircraft regulations led to plans for kit production.

The Twin-R follows previous MCR series structural practice with much use of carbon fibre, notably in the spars and ribs of the wings and control surfaces, which have pre-formed aluminium skins. The fuselage is a carbon fibre monocoque. The wings have constant chord as on the MCR4S, though the increased span raises the aspect ratio to 10.8, and the Twin-R uses the winglets of the early MCR4S versions (2001–2), with curved (in plan) trailing edges, rather than the later, straight edged ones. The aileron span is increased by 20% and the flaps are electrically operated. Like the MCR4S, the Twin-R has a swept fin, ventral fin and T-tail but the fin is taller and the all flying tailplane of greater span. The rudder area is almost doubled and the surface is double hinged to control yaw when one engine is shut down.

The cabin and rear fuselage of the Twin-R are similar to that of the MCR4S. The cabin has a large, forward hinged, one piece canopy with trapezoidal windows aft. It seats the pilot and three passengers in two side-by-side rows. The twin 74 kW (99 hp) Rotax 912ULS flat four engines are wing mounted. The tricycle undercarriage has wing mounted, faired main legs and wheels.

The Twin-R appeared in public for the first time at the AERO Friedrichshafen 2010 show. It flew for the first time on 3 March 2011 piloted by Christian Briand.

== Variants ==
Twin-R
Kit built.
ELA1
Proposed certificated aircraft.

== Specifications (kitbuilt) ==
Data from Jane's All the World's Aircraft 2011/12

General characteristics

- Capacity: 4
- Length: 7.10 m (23 ft 4 in)
- Wingspan: 9.24 m (30 ft 4 in)
- Height: 1.90 m (6 ft 3 in)
- Wing area: 8.60 m^{2} (92.6 sq ft)
- Empty weight: 425 kg (937 lb)
- Max takeoff weight: 950 kg (2,094 lb)
- Fuel capacity: 110 L (24.2 Imp gal, 29.1 US gal) standard. Can be increased to 200 L (44 Imp gal, 52.8 US gal)
- Powerplant: 2 × Rotax 912ULS flat four, air- and water-cooled piston, 73.5 kW (98.6 hp) each
- Propellers: 2-bladed

Performance

- Maximum speed: 335 km/h (208 mph, 181 kn)
- Cruise speed: 326 km/h (203 mph, 176 kn) normal, at 75% power at 2,438 m (7,999 ft)
- Stall speed: 92 km/h (57 mph, 50 kn) flaps down
- Range: 2,129 km (1,323 mi, 1,150 nmi) with maximum fuel
- Rate of climb: 7.6 m/s (1,500 ft/min)

Avionics

- Dynon Skyview 3-screen EFIS recommended
