= Dyn'Aéro MCR01 =

French light aircraft

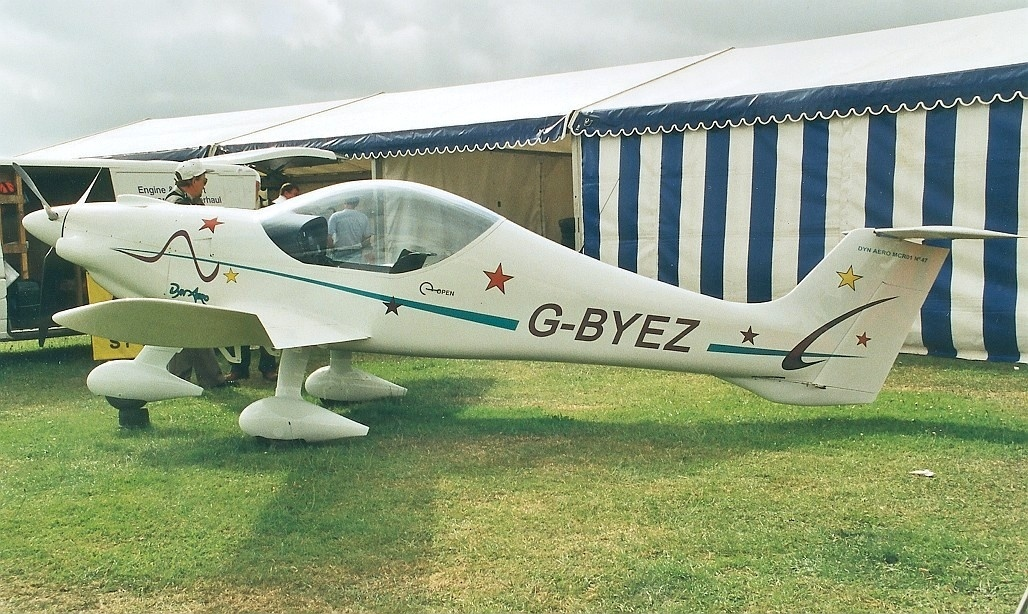
- MCR01 'CLUB'

General information
- Type: Light Aircraft / Ultralight
- National origin: France
- Manufacturer: Dyn'Aéro; SE Aviation
- Status: In production
- Number built: 500+

History
- First flight: July 1996
- Developed from: Colomban MC-100
- Variant: Dyn'Aéro MCR4S

The Dyn'Aéro MCR01 is a two-seat, low-wing, all-composite carbon fibre light aircraft that was originally manufactured by Dyn'Aéro and is now available in kit form and ready-to-fly through SE Aviation.

== Development ==
The MCR01 is a variant of the Colomban MC-100 Ban-bi originally designed by Michel Colomban.

== Variants ==
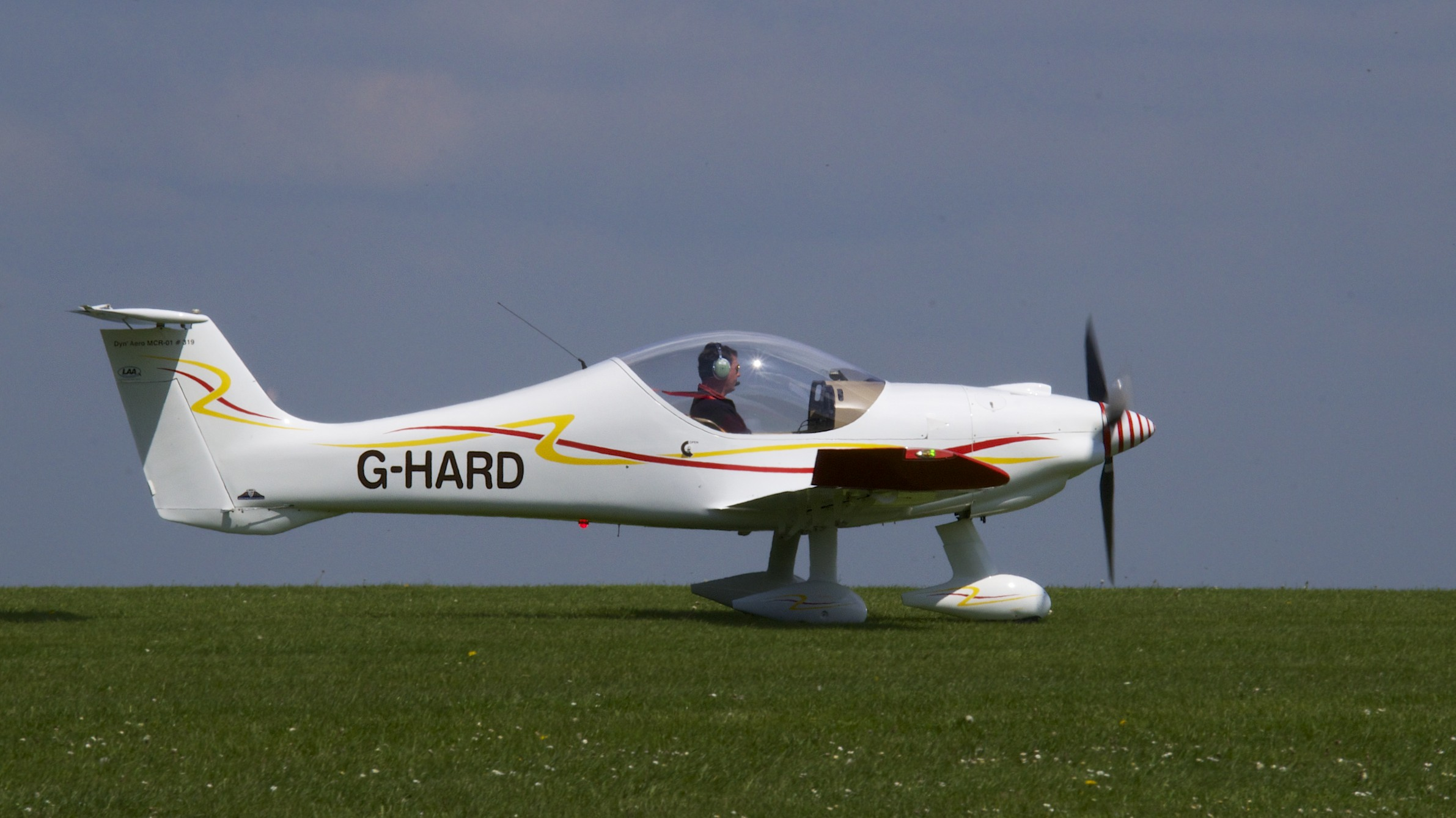
A Dyn'Aéro MCR01 'ULC'

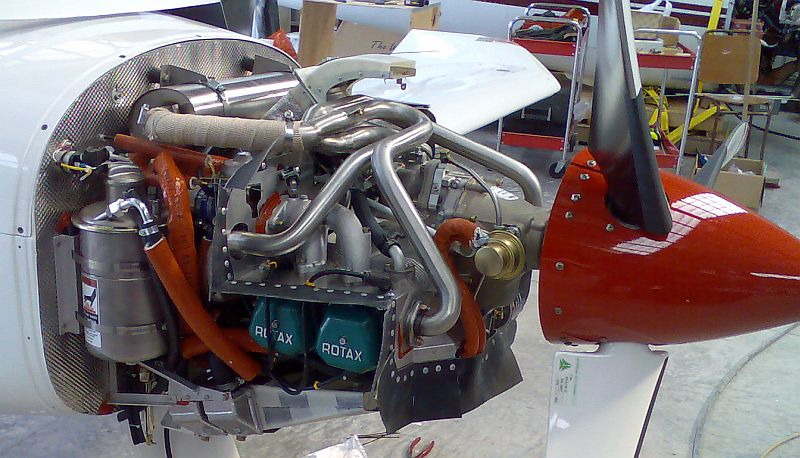
A Rotax 912S installed in a Dyn'Aéro MCR01 'CLUB'

MCR01 'VLA' (Sportster)
The MCR01 VLA (Sportster) is the JAR-VLA (Very Light Aircraft) version of the MCR, with combined flaperons, for the amateur-built category in most countries and flown with a Private Pilot Licence. The maximum speed is 318 km/h (198 mph or 172 kn) when powered by the 100 hp (75 kW) Rotax 912ULS while the stall speed in landing configuration is 87 km/h (54 mph or 47 kn). The wing of this aircraft has a chord as short as 0.80 m (31 in) and an area of 5.20 m^{2}. While the early version of the kit was intended to have wings made from bonded aluminium sheet like the Colomban MC-100, this skin has been replaced with carbon fibre as can be seen on photographs shown by Dyn'Aéro Australia and New Zealand: "Note the advanced state of the wings behind the fuselage... The black colour is the natural colour of the carbon fibre before priming". Nowadays, everything in the plane is made out of carbon fiber. Even rudder pedals are carbon fiber. The design features a T-tail. The wings of the aircraft are easily removed from the fuselage so that the whole aircraft can be towed and stored in a trailer.

MCR01 Club
The MCR01 Club is a version with a slightly bigger wing than the VLA, and less responsive controls for club and school flight training use.

MCR01 'ULC'
The MCR01 ULC is designed to comply with the Fédération Aéronautique Internationale microlight rules. It has a 8.64 m (28.3 ft) span wing with an area of 8.13 m^{2} (87.5 sq ft) and a stall speed of 63 km/h (39 mph). Cruise speed is 271 km/h (168 mph) when equipped with an 80 hp (60 kW) Rotax 912UL engine.

MCR '4S'
The MCR '4S' is a 4-seater version from the MCR family, and being too heavy for the ultralight class is usually registered in the homebuilt aircraft category. The MCR4s is powered by either the 100 hp (75 kW) Rotax 912ULS or the turbocharged 115 hp (86 kW) Rotax 914 and has a standard empty weight of 350 kg (772 lb) and a maximum takeoff weight of 750 kg (1,653 lb).

== Accidents and incidents ==
- On 18 October 2005, MCR-01 OB-1701 suffered a nose landing gear collapse while taxiing before takeoff for a training flight at Las Dunas airport (SPLH), Ica, Peru. Both pilots were uninjured. However, the aircraft suffered significant damage to the nose, engine and propeller. After investigation by the Directorate General of Civil Aviation of Peru it was found that the nose gear strut broke at a point where it was welded to the wheel bracket, and this was probably caused by a combination of fatigue, corrosion and a design fault. As a result, both MCR-01 aircraft registered in Peru were grounded by the Directorate General of Civil Aviation of Peru and declared unairworthy, until a satisfactory factory redesign of the nose landing gear was made available by Dyn'Aéro. Shortly after the accident, Dyn'Aéro published a Service Bulletin to encourage MCR owners to inspect the weld joint between the front leg tube and the wheel bracket. Finally, a nose gear reinforcement part was made available for mandatory installation by April 2008.
- On 30 December 2007, MCR-01 G-BZXG crashed on Burgham Park Golf Course, Felton, Northumberland, United Kingdom following the detachment of the empennage in flight. The pilot and his passenger were both seriously injured. An investigation by the Air Accidents Investigation Branch revealed that some designs of attachment lugs for the all-flying tailplane had a design fault. As a result of the accident, on 6 February 2008 all MCR-01 aircraft registered in the United Kingdom were grounded by the Civil Aviation Authority until they had been inspected and new attachment lugs of stainless steel had been fitted if necessary. On 13 February 2009, Dyn'Aéro issued a Service Bulletin requiring inspection of all MCR-01 aircraft, and the replacement of attachment lugs where necessary. On 22 February 2009, the French Direction Générale de l'Aviation Civile issued an Airworthiness Directive, mandating the Service Bulletin issued by Dyn'Aéro.

== Specifications ==
Data from Brassey's World Aircraft & Systems Directory

General characteristics

- Capacity: 2
- Length: 5.4 m (17 ft 9 in)
- Wingspan: 6.63 m (21 ft 9 in)
- Empty weight: 235 kg (518 lb)
- Gross weight: 490 kg (992 lb)
- Powerplant: 1 × Rotax 912 , 60 kW (80 hp)

Performance

- Maximum speed: 318 km/h (198 mph, 172 kn)
- Cruise speed: 300 km/h (186 mph, 162 kn)
- Stall speed: 80 km/h (50 mph, 43 kn)
- Range: 1,050 km (652 mi, 567 nmi)
- Rate of climb: 7.00 m/s (1,378 ft/min)
