= Michel Colomban =

French aircraft designer

- Born: 1932 (age 93–94); France
- Education: Conservatoire national des arts et métiers
- Occupation: aeronautical engineer

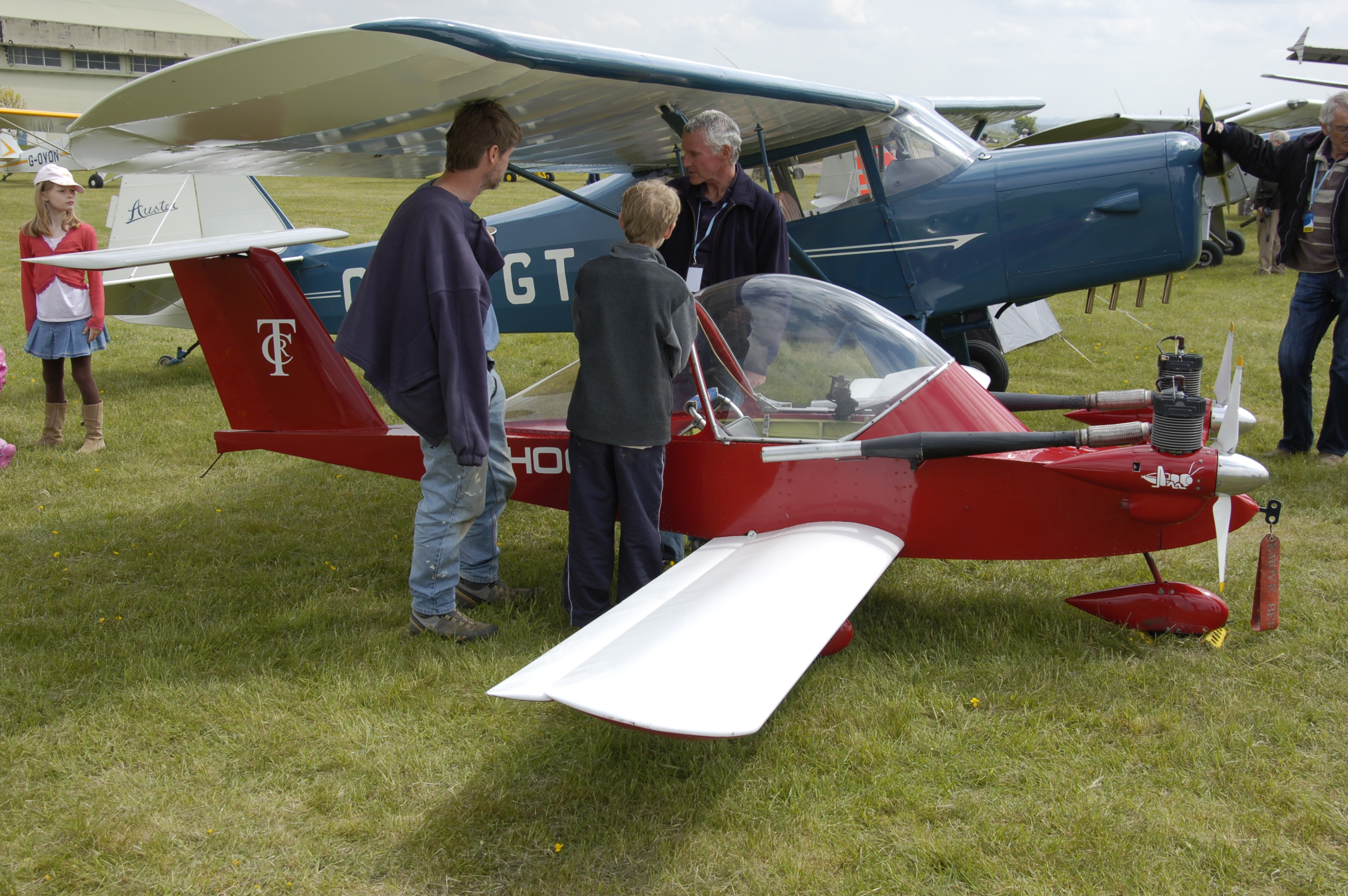
1984 Colomban MC-15 Cri-cri in England

Michel Colomban (born 1932 in France) is a French aeronautical engineer known for his home-built aircraft. He originally worked for Morane-Saulnier on the Morane-Saulnier MS-880 (Rallye), and also later for Société Nationale d'Industrie Aérospatiale. He designed the Colomban Cri-cri in 1973. In the 1990s, he also designed the aluminium and composite Colomban MC-100 Ban-Bi, a two-seat aircraft that can reach 300 km/h (186 mph) with an 80 hp (60 kW) engine. More recently, Colomban designed the wood, composite and canvas MC-30 Luciole ultralight, which has a maximum speed of 200 km/h (124 mph).

Michel Colombon graduates with a Diplôme d'ingénieur from the Conservatoire national des arts et métiers.
