= Darois =

- Commune
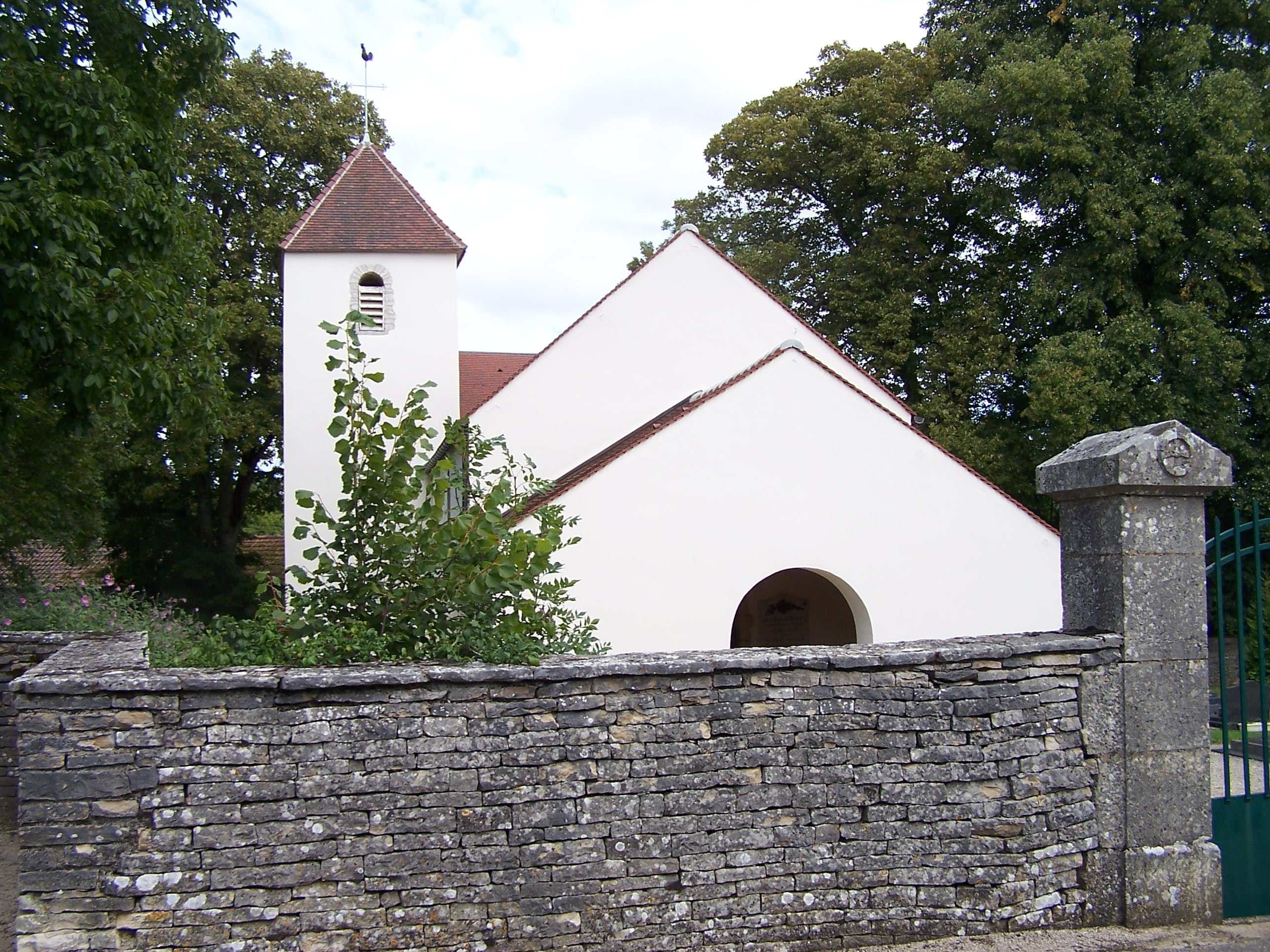
- The church in Darois

- Coat of arms
- Location of Darois
- Location within France Location within Bourgogne-Franche-Comté
- Coordinates: 47°23′29″N 4°56′25″E
- Country: France
- Region: Bourgogne-Franche-Comté
- Department: Côte-d'Or
- Arrondissement: Dijon
- Canton: Fontaine-lès-Dijon

Government
  - Mayor (2020–2026): Pascal Minard
- Area^{1}: 8.12 km^{2} (3.14 sq mi)
- Elevation: 495 m (1,624 ft)
- Highest elevation: 542 m (1,778 ft)
- Lowest elevation: 340 m (1,120 ft)
- Population (2023): 493
  - Density: 60.7/km^{2} (157/sq mi)
- Time zone: UTC+01:00 (CET)
  - Summer (DST): UTC+02:00 (CEST)
- INSEE/Postal code: 21227 /21121
- ^{1} French Land Register data, which excludes lakes, ponds, glaciers > 1 km^{2} (0.386 sq mi or 247 acres) and river estuaries.

Darois (French pronunciation: [daʁwa]) is a commune in the Côte-d'Or department in eastern France.

== Population ==
Historical population
Year	Pop.	±% p.a.
1968	94	—
1975	163	+8.18%
1982	272	+7.59%
1990	313	+1.77%
1999	352	+1.31%
2007	380	+0.96%
2012	438	+2.88%
2017	493	+2.39%
2023	493	+0.00%
Source: INSEE

== Economy ==
Dyn'Aéro has its headquarters in Darois.

== See also ==
- Communes of the Côte-d'Or department
