= List of aircraft (Co–Cz) =

This is a list of aircraft in alphabetical order beginning with 'Co' through to 'Cz'.

== Co–Cz ==
=== Co-Z ===
(Co-Z Development Co, Mesa, AZ)

- Cozy Mark III
- Cozy Mark IV
- CoZ Europe Cosy

=== Coandă ===
(Henri Coandă)

- Coandă-1910
- Coandă-Delauney-Belleville pusher fighter
- Coandă No.4 (Coandă-Delauney-Belleville pusher fighter)

=== Coates Swalesong ===
- Coates Swalesong S.A.I
- Coates Swalesong S.A.II
- Coates Swalesong S.A.III

=== Coavio ===
(Coavio srl, Ferentino, Italy)

- Coavio DF 2000

=== Cobalt ===
(Cobalt Aircraft industries, Airparc 6C, Avenue de l'Europe, 78117 Toussous le-Noble)

- Cobalt Co50

=== Cobra ===
(Cobra Aviation)

- Cobra Arrow

=== Codock ===
(Cockatoo Dockyard & Engineering Co)

- CoDock LJW-6

=== Coddington & Webb ===
(C C Coddington & Magnum Webb, Charlotte, NC)

- Coddington & Webb 1910 aeroplane

=== Cody ===
- British Army Aeroplane No. 1
- Cody II
- Cody III
- Cody IV monoplane
- Cody V
- Cody Floatplane
- Cody Michelin Cup Biplane
- Cody Circuit of Britain biplane

=== Coelho ===
(Altair Coelho)

- Coelho AC.1
- Super Rotor AC.4 Andorinha
- Coelho AC.11

=== Coffyn ===
(Frank Coffyn, Knoxville, TN)

- Coffyn 1910 Hydro-Aeroplane

=== Coffman ===
((Sam H) Coffman-(C R) Strong Aircraft Co)

- Coffman 3-B
- Coffman A
- Coffman Air Coupe
- Coffman C-1 Racer
- Coffman Junior
- Coffman Monoplane Special
- Coffman-Ranger W

=== Colani ===
(Luigi Colani / Colani/Composite Engineering (CCE))

- Colani Cormoran
- Colani Pontresina

=== Colden ===
(Milton Colden, Clintonville, WI)

- Colden C-1 Cyclops (a.k.a. MWP)

=== Cole (aircraft constructor) ===
- Cole Parasol Monoplane

=== Cole ===
(Cole School of Aviation/Cole Aircraft Corp, 3617 Euclid Ave, Cleveland, OH)

- Cole Model 1
- Cole Sport
- Cole commercial

=== Cole ===
(Ross A Cole, Dallas, TX)

- Cole 1929 circular wing aircraft

=== Cole ===
(J Raymond Cole, Oklahoma City, OK)

- Cole 1933 monoplane

=== Coleman ===
(L J Coleman, Sioux City, IA)

- Coleman Speed Scout

=== Colgate-Larsen ===
(1940: (Gilbert) Colgate-(Victor A) Larsen Aircraft Co, Amityville, NY)

- Colgate-Larsen CL-15

=== Collard-Souquet-Raniéri ===
(Maurice Collard, Jacques Souquet & Jacques Raniéri)

- Collard-Souquet-Raniéri CSR.1 Tsé-Tsé

=== Collier ===
((William S) Collier Aircraft Sales, Tulsa, OK)

- Collier Ambassador Trainer
- Collier CA-1 Ambassador
- Collier T-21-1

=== Collier-Combs ===
((William S) Collier & (L A) Combs Aircraft Co, Ponca City, OK)

- Collier-Combs Commercial Cabin

=== Collins ===
(DeWitt Collins, Winthrop, IA)

- Collins Aerodyne
- Collins X-112 Aerofoil Boat

=== Collins ===
(Collins Radio Co, Marine Lab, Cedar Rapids, IL)

- Collins Special

=== Collins ===
(Collins Aero, Chadds Ford, PA)

- Collins Dipper
- Collins W-7 Dipper

=== Collivier ===
- Collivier CO-02
- Collivier CO-04
- Collivier DR 100

=== Colomban ===
(Michel Colomban)

- Colomban MC-10 Cri-Cri
- Colomban MC-12 Cri-Cri
- Colomban MC-15 Cri-Cri
- Colomban MC-22 Cri-Cri
- Colomban MC-30 Luciole
- Colomban MC-100 Ban-Bi
- Colomban-Robin MCR4S

=== Colonial ===
(1946: Colonial Aircraft Corp (Fdr: David B Thurston), Huntington Station, Long Island, NY, 1955: Moved to Sanford, ME (Pres: Herbert Lindblad), 1959: Acquired by Lake Aircraft Corp.)

- Colonial Skimmer

=== Columbia ===
((Willis C) Brown-(Richard) Young a.k.a. Columbia Aircraft Co.)

- Columbia BY-1
- Columbia Sesquiplane
- Columbia Model 2

=== Columbia ===
- Columbia 300
- Columbia 350
- Columbia 400

=== Columbia ===
(Columbia Air Liners Inc (Fdr: Charles A Levine), Hempstead (Valley Stream), NY. Seen as a division of Grumman during WW2, but if this was fact, substantiation was not found. 1946: Acquired by Commonwealth Aircraft Corp.

- Columbia CAL-1 Triad
- Columbia Uncle Sam
- Grumman J2F Duck
- Columbia JL

=== Colyaer ===
(Colyaer SL, Portonovo, Spain)

- Colyaer Mascato S100
- Colyaer Martin3 S100
- Colyaer Gannet S100
- Colyaer Freedom S100

=== Comac ===
(Commercial Aircraft Corporation of China, Ltd.; Shanghai, China)

- Comac C909; formerly the ARJ21
- Comac C919
- Comac C929
- Comac C939
- Comac C949

=== Combscraft ===
(Combs Aircraft Corp, Combs Field, Denver, CO)

- Combscraft 1939 monoplane

=== Comco Ikarus ===
- Ikarus Sherpa
- Ikarus C22
- Ikarus C42
- Ikarus C52
- Ikarus 500

=== Command-Aire ===
(Command-Aire Inc / Arkansas Aircraft Company, Little Rock, AR)

- Command-Aire 3C3
- Command-Aire 4C3
- Command-Aire 5C3
- Command-Aire BS-14
- Command-Aire BS-15 (likely a typo as none of their sources mention a 15)
- Command-Aire BS-16
- Command-Aire Cotton Duster
- Command-Aire MR-1 Little Rocket racer

=== Commander ===
(Commander Aircraft Co)

- Commander 112
- Commander 114
- Commander 115
- Commander Fanjet 1500

=== Commercial ===
(Commercial Aircraft Corp, Metropolitan Airport, Van Nuys, CA)

- Commercial C-1 Sunbeam
- Commercial Sumbeam C-102
- Commercial Sunbeam C-2
- Commercial Sunbeam Pup LP-1

=== Commonwealth ===
- CAC CA-1 Wirraway
- CAC CA-2 Wackett
- CAC CA-3 Wirraway
- CAC CA-4 Woomera
- CAC CA-5 Wirraway
- CAC CA-6 Wackett
- CAC CA-7 Wirraway
- CAC CA-8 Wirraway
- CAC CA-9 Wirraway
- CAC CA-10 Wirraway
- CAC CA-11 Woomera
- CAC CA-12 Boomerang
- CAC CA-13 Boomerang
- CAC CA-14 Boomerang
- CAC CA-15
- CAC CA-16 Wirraway
- CAC CA-17 Mustang
- CAC CA-18 Mustang
- CAC CA-19 Boomerang
- CAC CA-20 Wirraway
- CAC CA-22 Winjeel
- CAC CA-23
- CAC CA-24
- CAC CA-25 Winjeel
- CAC CA-26 Sabre
- CAC CA-27 Sabre
- CAC CA-28 Ceres
- CAC CA-29 Mirage
- CAC CA-30
- CAC CA-32 Kiowa
- CAC AA107

=== Commonwealth ===
(1943: Commonwealth Aircraft Co, Kansas City, KS, reorganized from Rearwin Co to build assault gliders, 1949: Valley Stream, NY)

- Commonwealth 185 Skyranger
- Commonwealth C-170 Trimmer

=== Commuter ===
(Commuter Aircraft Corp, Youngstown, OH)

- Commuter CAC-100

=== Commuter Craft ===
- Commuter Craft Innovator

=== Comp Air ===
(Aerocomp Inc, Merritt Island, FL / Comp Air)

- Comp Air 3
- Comp Air 4
- Comp Air 6
- Comp Air 7
- Comp Air 8
- Comp Air 9
- Comp Air 10
- Comp Air 11
- Comp Air 12
- Comp Air Jet
- Aerocomp Merlin

=== Compagnie Française d'Aviation ===
(Compagnie Française d'Aviation – C.F.A. – Division of Salmson)

=== Compcop ===
(Compcop Inc (Pres: Stephen Geraghty), Redwood City, CA)

- Compcop Boon Junior
- Compcop G-1

=== Comper ===
(see Fane for Comper Fane, which was started by Nick Comper and finished by Gerard Fane)

- Comper Swift
- Comper Mouse
- Comper Streak
- Comper Kite
- Comper Scamp
- Comper Fly

=== Composite ===
(Composite Aircraft Corporation)

- Composite/Windecker Eagle
- Composite Eagle TC

=== Compton ===
(Rollo L Compton, San Antonio, TX)

- Compton Special

=== Comstock ===
(David Comstock, Roundup, MT)

- Comstock 1932 monoplane

=== Comte ===
(Flugzeugbau A. Comte / Robert Wild)

- Comte AC-1
- Comte AC-3
- Comte AC-4
- Comte AC-8
- Comte AC-11-V
- Comte AC-12 Moskito
- Wild DT
- Wild 43
- Wild X biplane

=== Con Ellingston ===
(Con D Ellingston & Earl E Hansen, Great Falls, MT)

- Con Ellingston Special

=== Conair ===
- Conair Firecat

=== Conal ===
- Conal W-151 Willi

=== Concept Aviation ===
(Knoxville, TN)

- Concept Prowler

=== Concept Composites ===
(Pouance, France)

- Concept Composites MD03 Transat

=== Condit ===
(Clifford Condit, Partridge, IL)

- Condit Experimental

=== Condor ===
(Condor Aero Inc.)

- Condor Shoestring

=== Condor ===
(Condor Aircraft)

- Condor Aircraft Condor
- Condor Aircraft Condor II
- Condor Aircraft Condor III

=== Condry & Stephen ===
(Condry & (Lawrence) Stephen, San Jose, CA)

- Condry Solo Sportster

=== Conn One Design ===
(Daytona Beach, FL)

- Conn One Design

=== Connecticut ===
- Connecticut Aircraft Company DN-1 Airship/Blimp
- Connecticut Aircraft Company A-class Blimp
- Connecticut Aircraft Company B-class Blimp

=== Conquist ===
(Clifford Condit & Gus Palmquist, Milwaukee, WI)

- Conquist 1934 monoplane

=== Conrad ===
(Ronald Conrad, Earl Player, Jack Buttons, Salt Lake City, UT)

- Conrad Bumblebee

=== Conrad ===
(Roland Conrad, Salt Lake, UT)

- Conrad Bumblebee

=== Conroy ===
(Conroy aircraft / Jack Conroy)

- Conroy Skymonster
- Conroy Stolifter
- Conroy Turbo Albatross
- Conroy Turbo Three
- Conroy Tri-Turbo-Three

=== Consolidated ===
(for later types see Convair)

- Consolidated Model 1 PT-1 Trusty
- Consolidated Model 2 PT-3/NY-1 Husky
- Consolidated Model 3 design for USN competition
- Consolidated Model 4 biplane design
- Consolidated Model 5 monoplane design with Wright J-5 engine
- Consolidated Model 6 monoplane design for US Army
- Consolidated Model 7 O-17 Courier
- Consolidated Model 8 floatplane variant of model 7
- Consolidated Model 9 XPY-1 Admiral
- Consolidated Model 10 cabin monoplane with Wright J-5B engine
- Consolidated Model 11 Guardian twin-engine bomber design, dropped in favor of joint S-37 project with Sikorsky
- Consolidated Model 12 Husky, commercial version of PT-3
- Consolidated Model 14 Husky Junior became Fleet Model 1
- Consolidated Model 15 variant of model 7 with Pratt & Whitney R-1340
- Consolidated Model 16 Commodore
- Consolidated Model 17 Fleetster
- Consolidated Model 18 XBY-1, naval version of Fleetster
- Consolidated Model 20 Fleetster, parasol wing version
- Consolidated Model 21 PT-11/N4Y
- Consolidated Model 22 P2Y Ranger
- Consolidated Model 23 modified Thomas-Morse Y1O-41
- Consolidated Model 24 Fleetster
- Consolidated Model 25 Y1P-25
- Consolidated Model 26 P-30/PB-2
- Consolidated Model 27 XA-11, attack version of P-30
- Consolidated Model 28 PBY Catalina
- Consolidated Model 29 PB2Y Coronado
- Consolidated Model 30 XPB3Y (cancelled)
- Consolidated Model 31 XP4Y Corregidor
- Consolidated Model 32 B-24 Liberator
- Consolidated Model 33 XB-32 Terminator
- Consolidated Model 34 B-32 Dominator
- Consolidated Model 35 six-engine tandem tractor/pusher bomber design, not built
- Consolidated Model 36 B-36 Peacemaker (initially B-35, but changed to B-36 to avoid confusion with the YB-35)
- Consolidated Model 37 civil airliner variant of XC-99
- Consolidated Model 38 B-24D fuselage with a P4Y wing (project)
- Consolidated Model 39 R2Y-1 Liberator Liner
- Consolidated Model 40 PB4Y-2 Privateer, naval version of the B-32
- Consolidated A-11
- Consolidated A-44
- Consolidated AT-22
- Consolidated B-24 Liberator
- Consolidated B-32 Dominator
- Consolidated B-41 Liberator
- Consolidated BT-6
- Consolidated BT-7
- Consolidated BY Fleetster
- Consolidated B2Y
- Consolidated C-11 Fleetster
- Consolidated C-22 Fleetster
- Consolidated C-87 Liberator Express
- Consolidated C-109 Liberator Express
- Consolidated F-7
- Consolidated NY Trusty
- Consolidated N2Y
- Consolidated N3Y
- Consolidated N4Y
- Consolidated O-17 Courier
- Consolidated OA-10 Catalina
- Consolidated P-25
- Consolidated P-27
- Consolidated P-28
- Consolidated P-30
- Consolidated P-33
- Consolidated PB-2
- Consolidated PBY Catalina
- Consolidated PB2Y Coronado
- Consolidated PB3Y
- Consolidated PB4Y-1 Liberator
- Consolidated PB4Y-2 Privateer
- Consolidated PT-1
- Consolidated XPT-2
- Consolidated PT-3
- Consolidated PT-4
- Consolidated PT-5
- Consolidated PT-6
- Consolidated PT-8
- Consolidated PT-11
- Consolidated PT-12
- Consolidated XPT-933
- Consolidated PY Admiral
- Consolidated P2Y Ranger
- Consolidated P3Y
- Consolidated P4Y Corregidor
- Consolidated P4Y Privateer
- Consolidated P5Y
- Consolidated RY
- Consolidated R2Y
- Consolidated T-32
- Consolidated TBY Sea Wolf
- Consolidated TW-3
- Consolidated Courier
- Consolidated CXP-28
- Consolidated LB-4
- Consolidated LB-5
- Consolidated LB-6
- Consolidated LB-8
- Consolidated LB-9
- Consolidated LB-12
- Consolidated LB-13
- Consolidated LB-14
- Consolidated LB-15
- Consolidated LB-16
- Consolidated LB-17
- Consolidated LB-19
- Consolidated LB-20
- Consolidated LB-22
- Consolidated LB-24
- Consolidated LB-25
- Consolidated LB-26
- Consolidated LB-27
- Consolidated LB-28
- Consolidated LB-29
- Consolidated LB-30
- Consolidated HXC
- Consolidated Navy Experimental Type C Flying-Boat

=== Constantinescu ===
(Cristea Constantinescu)

- Constantinescu C.O.-2

=== Contender ===
(Contender Aircraft Co, Sunnyvale, CA)

- Contender 202
- Contender 303
- Contender 606

=== Continental ===
(Continental Aircraft & Transportation Corp (pres: Fred Leinweber), Phoenix, AZ)

- Continental 1910 Biplane

=== Continental ===
(1929: Continental Aircraft Co, 704 E Douglas, Wichita, KS)

- Continental 1929 aeroplane

=== Continental ===
(1912: Continental Aircraft Corp (pres: Hugh Copeland), Amityville, NY)

- Continental KB-1 Military Biplane
- Continental KB-3

=== Continental ===
(Continental Aviation Corp (founders: M W Giddings and E R Willard), Boeing Field, Seattle, WA, 6/26/31: company into receivership)

- Continental 3000

=== Continental ===
(Continental Motors Company, Muskegon and Detroit, MI)

- Continental 1924 Biplane

=== Continental Copters ===
- Continental Copters El Tomcat
- Continental Copters JC-1 Jet-Cat

=== Convair ===
- Convair Model 100 PB4Y-2 Privateer; former Consolidated Model 40
- Convair Model 101 RY-3/C-87 Liberator Express; former Consolidated Model 32
- Convair Model 102 XP-81 (Vultee design)
- Convair Model 103 Stout Skycar IV
- Convair Model 104 R2Y Liberator Liner; former Consolidated Model 39
- Convair Model 105 L-13 (Stinson design)
- Convair Model 106 Skycoach
- Convair Model 107 twin-engine, 8-10 passenger airliner project
- Convair Model 108 Voyager (Stinson design)
- Convair Model 109 XB-46; later Convair Model 1
- Convair Model 110 Convair-Liner; prototype for Convair CV-240 series
- Convair Model 111 Aircar (Stinson design)
- Convair Model 112 XB-53
- Convair Model 115 XP-92
- Convair Model 116 ConVairCar
- Convair Model 117 P5Y Tradewind; evolved into the R3Y
- Convair Model 118 ConVairCar

- Convair Model 1 XB-46
- Convair Model 2 F2Y Sea Dart
- Convair Model 3 R3Y Tradewind
- Convair Model 4 B-58 Hustler
- Convair Model 5 XFY Pogo
- Convair Model 6 planned double-deck airliner development of B-36; production version of Consolidated Model 37
- Convair Model 7 XSM-65 Atlas
- Convair Model 8 F-102 Delta Dagger
- Convair Model 9 NB-36H Crusader
- Convair Model 10 logistic transport aircraft project
- Convair Model 11 YB-60 Jet Peacemaker; all-jet development of the B-36
- Convair Model 12: possibly for tactical versions of the F2Y
- Convair Model 15 Dart; four-engine, 60 passenger pressurized airliner with Rolls-Royce Dart turboprops
- Convair Model 16 B-58A
- Convair Model 17 B-58 study
- Convair Model 18 N-2; large turbojet airliner for TWA; led to the 880
- Convair Model 19 six-engine version of Model 18
- Convair Model 20 four-engine double deck airliner
- Convair Model 22 880
- Convair Model 23 USN nuclear-powered supersonic attack seaplane projects
- Convair Model 24 XP6Y-1; open ocean ASW seaplane
- Convair Model 25 WS-125A CAMAL; nuclear-powered bomber
- Convair Model 27 LV-3B Atlas D; space launch vehicle
- Convair Model 30 990 Coronado; initially Model 22M
- Convair Model 31 version of 880 with increased fuel capacity
- Convair Model 38 640?; transport project similar to Fokker F-28
- Convair Model 48 Charger; US Army COIN submittal for OV-10 competition; Convair's last complete aircraft
- Convair Model 49 ducted-rotor, tail-sitting VTOL for AAFSS competition
- Convair Model 54 NX-2; nuclear-powered bomber
- Convair Model 55 Centaur; space vehicle project
- Convair Model 58-9 SST based on the B-58
- Convair Model 60 short-haul airliner derived from the 880/990
- Convair Model 61 Jet Transport; airliner project
- Convair Model 62 SST; stretched version of Model 58-9 for 52 passengers
- Convair Model 69 SLV-3 Atlas
- Convair 90 XA-41
- Convair Model 200
- Convair CV-240 family
  - Convair 240
  - Convair 300
  - Convair 340
  - Convair 440
  - Convair 540
  - Convair 580
  - Convair 5800
  - Convair 600
  - Convair 640
- Convair 660 twin-engine short-haul jet airliner, not built
- Convair 880
- Convair 990 Coronado
- Convair NX-2
- Convair UC-880
- Convair OA-10
- Convair A-41
- Convair A-44
- Convair B-36
  - Convair NB-36
- Convair B-58 Hustler
- Convair C-131
  - Convair NC-131H Samaritan
- Convair F-7 Sea Dart
- Convair F-92A
- Convair F-102 Delta Dagger
- Convair F-106 Delta Dart
- Convair F2Y Sea Dart
- Convair L-13
- Convair OY
- Convair P5Y
- Convair PQM-102
- Convair R2Y
- Convair R3Y Tradewind
- Convair R4Y
- Convair Super Hustler
- Convair T-29
- Convair X-6
- Convair X-12
- Convair X-30 NASP
- Convair XB-46
- Convair XB-53
- Convair XC-99
- Convair XF-92
- Convair XFY Pogo
- Convair XP-81
- Convair XP6Y
- Convair YB-60

=== Convertawings ===
(Convertawings Inc, Long Island, NY)

- Convertawings Quadrotor A
- Convertawings Quadrotor F

=== Cook ===
(Leon M Cook, Pampa, TX)

- Cook Shifflet

=== Cook ===
((John) Cook Aircraft Corp, Torrance, CA)

- Cook JC-1 Challenger

=== Cooke ===
(Weldon B Cooke, Pittsburg, CA, 1913: Sandusky, OH)

- Cooke#1 1912 Biplane
- Cooke A 1912 Flying Boat
- Cooke 1913 Biplane

=== Cooke ===
(G Carlyle Cooke, Winston-Salem, NC)

- Cooke 1928 Monoplane
- Cooke 1930 Aeroplane
- Cooke 113-G
- Cooke Mono

=== Cooke ===
(Sam Cooke)

- Cooke 1955 Monoplane

=== Cooley ===
(John F Cooley Aerial Navigation Co, Rochester, NY)

- Cooley 1910 Aeroplane

=== Cooley & Stroben ===
(Cooley & Stroben, Woodlake, CA)

- Cooley & Stroben A

=== Cooney ===
(Thomas A Cooney, Indianapolis, IN)

- Cooney R-3
- Cooney Tom Cat

=== Coonley ===
(Harold D Coonley, Miami, FL)

- Coonley Racer Little Toot

=== Cooper ===
(John D Cooper Aeroplane Co, Bridgeport, CT)

- Cooper Training Tractor

=== Cooper ===
(J B Cooper, Bridgeton, MO)

- Cooper S-A-1

=== Cooper-Travers ===
- Cooper-Travers Hawk

=== Copin ===
(Georges Copin)

- Copin 1911 Monoplan

=== Copland ===
(Harry Depew Copland, Detroit, MI)

- Copland 1911 Biplane

=== Corben ===
(Corben Sport Plane & Supply Co, Peru, IN and Madison, WI)

- Corben 6-S
- Corben 7-AD
- Corben B
- Corben C
- Corben Cabin Ace
- Corben Baby Ace
- Corben Junior Ace
- Corben Super Ace

=== Corby ===
(John Corby)

- Corby CJ-1 Starlet

=== Corcoran ===
(R Stanley Corcoran Co, New Lenox, IL)

- Corcoran 1970 Biplane
- Corcoran 65-1

=== Cord-Vultee ===
(Aircraft Development Div, (Erret L) Cord Mfg Co, Glendale, CA)

- Cord-Vultee V-1

=== Cordy ===
(Harry Cordy, Los Angeles, CA)

- Cordy Mobilopter

=== Corivi Aviation ===
(Italy)

- Corivi Pegaso

=== Corman ===
(Corman (Erret L Cord & Lucius B Manning) Aircraft Co, Dayton, OH)

- Corman 3000 a.k.a. Weihmiller 3000
- Corman 6000 a.k.a. Stinson SM-6000

=== Cornelius ===
(1930: (George Wilbur) Cornelius Aircraft Co, Glendale, CA, c.1935: Van Nuys, CA, c.1940: Dayton, OH, 1941: Cornelius-Hoepli Co.)

- Cornelius Fre-Wing
- Cornelius LW-1
- Cornelius Mallard
- Cornelius XFG-1
- Cornelius XBG-3

=== Cornu ===
(Paul Cornu)

- Cornu helicopter

=== Corvus ===
(Corvus Hungary LLC)

- Corvus Fusion
- Corvus Phantom RG
- Corvus Phantom UL
- Corvus Racer 312
- Corvus Racer 540
- Corvus Wild Angel
- Corvus Crusader

=== Coser-Oonk ===
(Joseph Coser & John Oonk, St Louis, MO)

- Coser-Oonk CO-2 Our Lady

=== Cosmic ===
(Cosmic Aircraft Corp, Bridgeport, CT)

- Cosmic CC-1
- Cosmic F-23

=== Cosmic Wind ===
- Little Toni
- Flying Frenchman
- Minnow
- Ballerina
- Miss Cosmic Wind

=== Cosmik Aviation ===
(Southam, United Kingdom)

- Cosmik Chaser

=== Cosmos ULM ===
(Fontaine-lès-Dijon, France)

- Cosmos Bison
- Cosmos Echo
- Cosmos Echo 12
- Cosmos Echo Fun
- Cosmos Echo Racer
- Cosmos Samba
- Cosmos Phase II
- Cosmos Phase II 503 Chronos 16
- Cosmos Phase II 582 Top 12.9
- Cosmos Phase III
- Cosmos Phase III 912 Top 14.9

=== Coubasch Monoplane ===
(L. Coubash)

- Coubasch Monoplane

=== Cougar ===
(Leonard Eaves, Oklahoma City, OK)

- Cougar 1965 Monoplane

=== Coulaud ===
(Coulaud)

- Coulaud Méo

=== Council for Scientific and Industrial Research ===
- CSIR Experimental Autogyro II

=== Coupé-Aviation ===
(Jacques Coupé)

- Coupé-Aviation JC-01
- Coupé-Aviation JC-2
- Coupé-Aviation JC-3
- Coupé-Aviation JC-200

=== Courier ===
(Courier Monoplane Co)

- Courier MT-1 (a.k.a. TK-100)
- Courier PB-1

=== Courtès ===
(Jean-Claude Courtès)

- Jean-Claude Courtès JCC.01

=== Courtois-Suffit Lescop ===
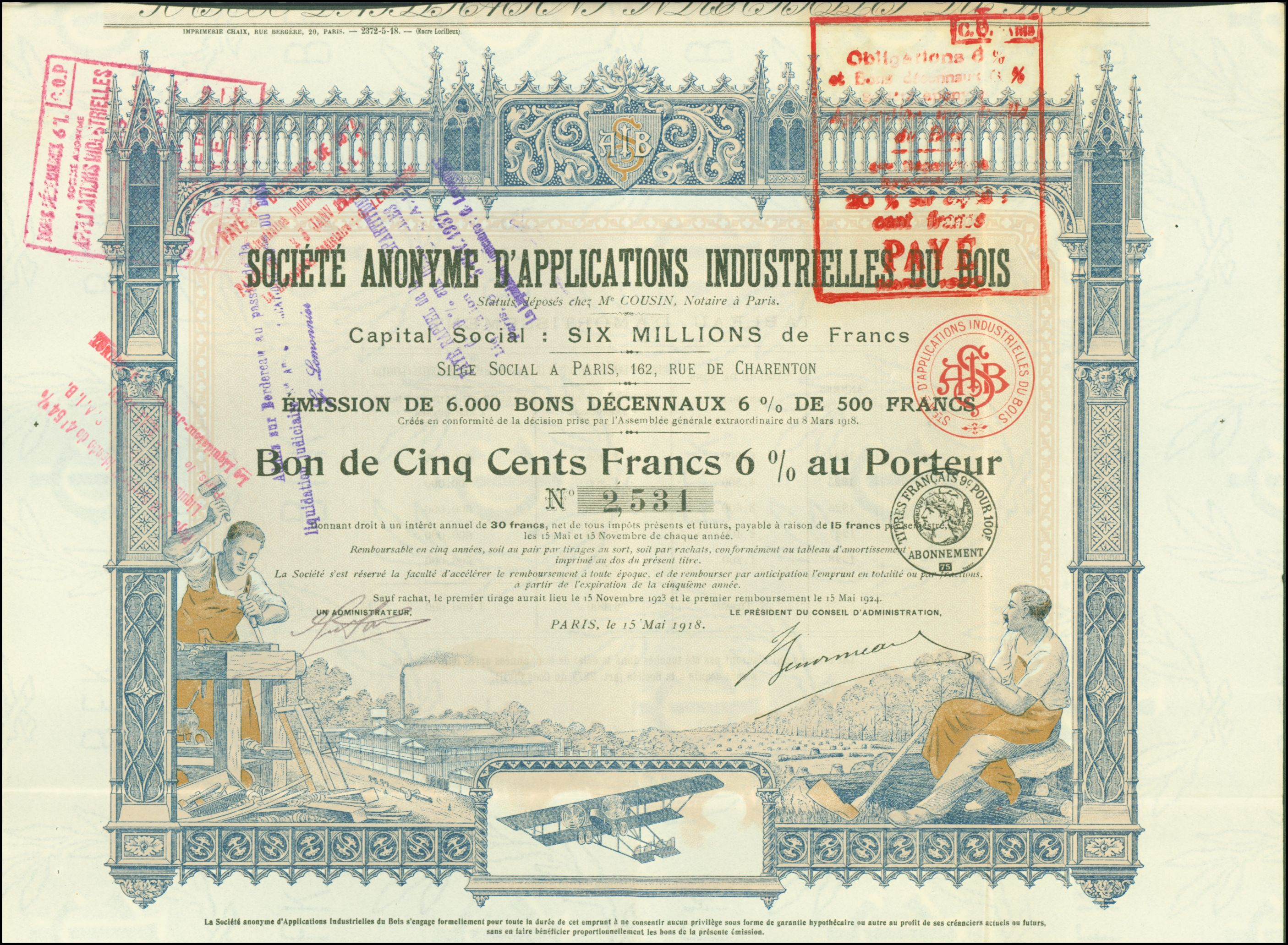
Bon of the S. A. d'Applications Industrielles du Bois, issued 15. May 1918

(Société Anonyme d'Applications Industrielles du Bois)

- Courtois-Suffit Lescop CSL C1
- Courtois-Suffit Lescop Clerget engined fighter

=== Coutant ===
(Société de Constructions Navales du Léman de Thonon-Les Bains)

- Coutant RMC 17

=== Coutou ===
(Coutou)

- Coutou Cri-cri

=== Couyaud ===
(Germain Couyaud)

- Couyaud GC.01

=== Couzinet ===
(Société des Avions René Couzinet / René Couzinet)

- Couzinet 10 'Arc en Ciel'
- Couzinet 20
- Couzinet 21
- Couzinet 22
- Couzinet 27 'Arc en Ciel'
- Couzinet 30
- Couzinet 33
- Couzinet 33 No.2
- Couzinet 40
- Couzinet 70 'Arc en Ciel III'
- Couzinet 80
- Couzinet 100
- Couzinet 101
- Couzinet 103
- Couzinet RC360
- Air-Couzinet AC-10
- Air-Couzinet 20B4

=== Cove ===
(Cove Biplane Co)

- Cove 1911 Biplane

=== Coventry Ordnance Works ===
- COW Biplane

=== Coward ===
(Ken S. Coward)

- Coward WeeBee

=== Cox ===
(Joseph A Cox, 107 S Shield St, Knox, IN, 1928: Starke County Aviation Club.)

- Cox C (later renamed 'Mickey Mouse')

=== Cox-Klemin ===
- Cox-Klemin CK-1
- Cox-Klemin CK-2
- Cox-Klemin CK-3
- Cox-Klemin CK-14
- Cox-Klemin CK-18 Sea hawk
- Cox-Klemin CK-19
- Cox-Klemin CO-1
- Cox-Klemin CO-2
- Cox-Klemin Night Hawk
- Cox-Klemin TW-2
- Cox-Klemin XA-1
- Cox-Klemin XO-4
- Cox-Klemin XS

=== CPA ===
(Chantiers de Provence Aviation)

- CPA 1

=== Craft Aerotech ===
(Craft Aerotech, Missoula, MT)

- Craft Aerotech 200
- Craft Aerotech 200FW

=== Crane ===
(James A Crane, Ellsworth ME.)

- Crane 1929 Ornithopter

=== Cranfield Institute of Technology ===
- Cranfield A1 (1967)

=== Cranwell ===
(Cranwell Light Aeroplane Club, United Kingdom)

- Cranwell C.L.A. Glider 1923
- Cranwell CLA.1
- Cranwell CLA.2
- Cranwell CLA.3
- Cranwell CLA.4
- Cranwell CLA.5
- Cranwell CLA.6
- Cranwell CLA.7 Swift

=== Crawford ===
((Harvey J) Crawford, Puyallup, WA)

- Crawford 1908 Biplane
- Crawford-Colvin 1911 Biplane
- Crawford 1913 Biplane

=== Crawford ===
(Crawford All-Metal Airplane Co Inc, Los Angeles, CA)

- Crawford A-1
- Crawford C-1
- Crawford CLM
- Crawford Commercial
- Crawford Courier
- Crawford Powered Glider (a series of powered primary's)
- Crawford WFC Special
- Crawford Runabout
- Crawford Special
- Crawford-Watanabe Sport
- Crawford-Watanabe Courier

=== Crawford & Howden ===
- Crawford & Howden monoplane

=== CRDA CANT ===
(see CANT)

=== Creative Flight ===
- Creative Flight Aerocat
- Creative Flight Aerocat SR
- Creative Flight Aerocat SRX
- Creative Flight Aerocat TR

=== Cricket Gyroplanes Ltd ===
- Campbell Cricket

=== Criquet Aviation ===
(Guaymaral, Colombia)

- Criquet Storch

=== Crocker-Hewitt ===
(Francis B Crocker and Peter Cooper-Hewitt)

- Crocker-Hewitt 1917 Helicopter

=== Croisé ===
(Alain Croisé)

- Croisé AC.1

=== Cromley ===
(1912: (C D) Cromley Multiplane Co, Reno, NV)

- Cromley 1912 Multiplane
- Cromley Helicopter

=== Cromwell ===
(Forrest E Cromwell, Wetmore, KS)

- Cromwell A-1

=== Crosby ===
(Harry Crosby, Burbank, CA)

- Crosby CR-3 (a.k.a. C6R-3)
- Crosby CR-4

=== Croses ===
(Emilien Croses)

- Croses EC-1 Pouplume
- Croses EC-2 Pouplume
- Croses EAC-3 Pouplume
- Croses EC-6 Criquet
- Croses LC-6
- Croses-Bujon BEC-7 Tous Terrains
- Croses EC-8 Tourisme
- Croses EC-9 Para-Cargo
- Croses LC-10 Criquet
- Croses-Noêl CN.1

=== Crosley ===
(1929: (Powel) Crosley Aircraft Mfg Div, Crosley Radio & Electronics Co, Sharonville, OH)

- Crosley Flea
- Crosley Moonbeam C-1
- Crosley Moonbeam C-2
- Crosley Moonbeam C-3
- Crosley Moonbeam C-4
- Crosley Power Glider

=== Cross-Foster ===
((Dr Walter M) Cross-(Jack E) Foster Aircraft Corp, Kansas City, MO)

- Cross-Foster CF-1

=== Crossland ===
(Aviation Construction Engr Co, Chicago, IL)

- Crossland Ace

=== Crouch-Bolas ===
(1931: (R J Goodman) Crouch-(Harold) Bolas, 21 Campbell St, Pawtucket, RI)

- Crouch-Bolas Dragon
- Crouch-Bolas Dragonfly
- Crouch-Bolas B-40 Pursuit
- Crouch-Bolas B-37 Speed Ranger

=== Crouch-Sowers ===
- Crouch-Sowers Special

=== Crowder ===
(Hugh Crowder)

- Crowder Blue Teal Custom

=== Crown ===
- Crown Custombuilt B-3

=== CRSS ===
- CRSS AA200 Orion
- CRSS AA300 Rigel
- CRSS AA330 Theta

=== Cruizaire ===
((W G) Dunn Mfg Co, Clarinda, IA)

- Cruizaire 1929 Monoplane

=== Crumley ===
(Crumley Multiplane Co.)

- Crumley 1912 Aeroplane

=== Crump ===
(Thomas Charles Crump, Grand Rapids, MI)

- Crump Low-Wing

=== Crusader ===
(Crusader Aircraft Corporation)

- Crusader AG-4
- Crusader AG-7

=== CSA ===
(Czech Sport Aircraft formerly CZAW)

- CSA Parrot
- CSA PS-10 Tourer
- CSA PS-28 Cruiser

=== CSC ===
(CSC Aircraft Company)

- CSC Maiden Saginaw

=== CSIR ===
(Council for Scientific and Industrial Research)

- CSIR Experimental Autogyro II

=== CSIRO ===
(Commonwealth Scientific and Industrial Research Organisation)

- CSIRO Mantis

=== CSS ===
(Centralne Studium Samolotów – Central Aircraft Studies)

- CSS-10
- CSS-11
- CSS-12
- CSS-13
- CSS-S-13

=== CTA ===
(Centro Técnico Aeroespacial)

- CTA BF-1 Beija-Flôr
- CTA Convertiplano
- CTA Paulistinha 56

=== CUB ===
- CUB Prospector
- CUB Cub

=== Cub Crafters ===
- CubCrafters Top Cub
- CubCrafters CC11-160 Carbon Cub SS
- CubCrafters CC11-100 Sport Cub S2 – an O-200 powered LSA variant [4]
- CubCrafters Carbon Cub EX – An experimental kit variant of the Carbon Cub SS
- CubCrafters Carbon Cub UL – A lightened variant of the Carbon Cub SS
- CubCrafters NX Cub – nosewheel addition
- CubCrafters CC18-180 Top Cub
- CubCrafters CC19-180 XCub

=== Cukurs ===
(Herberts Cukurs) – Latvia

- Cukurs C.1 Auseklits
- Cukurs C.2
- Cukurs C.3 Kurzemes Hercogiene
- Cukurs C.4
- Cukurs C.6 – Tris Zvaigznes
- Cukurs C.6bis

=== Culp ===
(Culp's Specialties, Shreveport, LA)

- Culp MonoCulp
- Culp Pup
- Culp Special

=== Culver ===
(Charles R Culver, Springfield, MA)

- Culver 1910 Pusher Biplane

=== Culver ===
(Lagar R Culver, Farmington, UT)

- Culver 1910 Biplane

=== Culver ===
(Culver Aircraft Company)

- Culver A-8
- Culver PQ-8
- Culver PQ-10
- Culver PQ-14
- Culver PQ-15
- Culver Q-8
- Culver TDC
- Culver TD2C
- Culver TD3C
- Culver TD4C
- Culver UC
- Culver Cadet LAR-90
- Culver Cadet LCA
- Culver Cadet LFA
- Culver Dart G
- Culver V
- Culver V-2
- Culver MR

=== Cunliffe-Owen ===
- Cunliffe-Owen Concordia
- Cunliffe-Owen Aircraft OA-1
- Harlow PJC-2

=== Cunning ===
((Grant S) Cunning Aircraft, Clearfield, UT)

- Cunning Volksplane

=== Cunningham-Hall ===
((Francis E) Cunningham-(Randolph F) Hall Aircraft Corp)

- Cunningham-Hall GA-21M
- Cunningham-Hall GA-36
- Cunningham-Hall PT-6
- Cunningham-Hall X-90

=== Currie ===
(J.R.Currie)

- Currie Wot

=== Curti ===
(Curti Aerospace)

- Curti Zefhir

=== Curtis Wright ===
(Curtis A Wright Aeronautical Corp. (unrelated to Curtiss-Wright Corp. - note spelling))

- Curtis Wright C.W.1A Coupe
- Curtis Wright C.W.1H Air Coach
- Curtis Wright C.W.2 Sport Trainer
- Curtis Wright CW-2 Flymobile a.k.a. Wek'copter
- Curtis Wright C.W.4 Commercial
- Curtis Wright C.W.5 Junior Transport
- Curtis Wright C.W.21 a.k.a. 21

=== Curtiss ===
(Curtiss Aeroplane and Motor Company)

==== Military designations USAAS/USAAF/USAF ====
- Curtiss A-3 Falcon
- Curtiss A-4 Falcon
- Curtiss A-4 Helldiver civil XF8C-8
- Curtiss A-5 Falcon
- Curtiss A-6 Falcon
- Curtiss A-8 Shrike
- Curtiss A-10 Shrike
- Curtiss A-12 Shrike
- Curtiss A-14 Shrike
- Curtiss A-18 Shrike
- Curtiss A-25 Shrike
- Curtiss A-40
- Curtiss A-43 Blackhawk
- Curtiss AT-4
- Curtiss AT-5
- Curtiss AT-9 Jeep
- Curtiss B-2 Condor
- Curtiss BT-4
- Curtiss C-10 Robin
- Curtiss C-30 Condor
- Curtiss C-46 Commando
- Curtiss C-55 Commando
- Curtiss C-76 Caravan
- Curtiss C-113 Commando
- Curtiss C-143
- Curtiss CO-X
- Curtiss F-87 Blackhawk
- Curtiss GS-1
- Curtiss GS-2
- Curtiss XNBS-4
- Curtiss O-1 Falcon
- Curtiss O-11
- Curtiss O-12
- Curtiss O-13
- Curtiss O-16
- Curtiss O-18
- Curtiss O-24
- Curtiss O-26
- Curtiss O-30
- Curtiss O-39
- Curtiss O-40 Raven
- Curtiss O-52 Owl
- Curtiss P-1 Hawk
- Curtiss P-2 Hawk
- Curtiss P-3 Hawk
- Curtiss P-5 Hawk
- Curtiss P-6 Hawk
- Curtiss P-10
- Curtiss P-11 Hawk
- Curtiss P-14
- Curtiss P-17
- Curtiss P-18
- Curtiss P-19
- Curtiss P-20 Hawk
- Curtiss P-21
- Curtiss P-22 Hawk
- Curtiss P-23 Hawk
- Curtiss P-31
- Curtiss P-36 Hawk
- Curtiss P-37
- Curtiss P-40
- Curtiss P-42
- Curtiss P-46
- Curtiss P-53
- Curtiss P-55 Ascender
- Curtiss P-60
- Curtiss P-62
- Curtiss P-71
- Curtiss P-87 Blackhawk
- Curtiss P-60
- Curtiss XP-934 P-31
- Curtiss PW-8
- Curtiss R-6
- Curtiss R-8 R2C-1 re-build
- Curtiss USAO-1 Licence production of Bristol F.2 Fighter
- Curtiss VF-11

==== Military designations USN ====
- Curtiss BTC
- Curtiss BT2C
- Curtiss BFC Goshawk
- Curtiss BF2C Goshawk
- Curtiss CR
- Curtiss CS
- Curtiss CT
- Curtiss FC
- Curtiss F2C
- Curtiss F3C
- Curtiss-Hall F4C
- Curtiss F5C – designation cancelled to avoid confusion with F-5 flying boats
- Curtiss F6C Hawk
- Curtiss F7C Seahawk
- Curtiss F8C Falcon
- Curtiss F9C Sparrowhawk
- Curtiss F10C Helldiver
- Curtiss F11C Goshawk
- Curtiss F12C
- Curtiss F13C
- Curtiss F14C
- Curtiss F15C
- Curtiss NC
- Curtiss N2C
- Curtiss OC
- Curtiss O2C
- Curtiss O3C
- Curtiss PN-1
- Curtiss RC Kingbird
- Curtiss R2C
- Curtiss R3C
- Curtiss R4C Condor
- Curtiss R5C Commando
- Curtiss SBC
- Curtiss SB2C Helldiver
- Curtiss SB3C
- Curtiss SC Seahawk
- Curtiss S2C Goshawk
- Curtiss S3C
- Curtiss S4C
- Curtiss SNC
- Curtiss SOC Seagull
- Curtiss SO2C
- Curtiss SO3C Seamew

==== Curtiss aircraft by name ====
- Curtiss Albany Flyer
- Curtiss America
- Curtiss Autoplane
- Curtiss Banshee Express
- Curtiss Canuck
- Curtiss Carrier Pigeon
- Curtiss Carrier Pigeon 2
- Curtiss Carrier Pigeon CO
- Curtiss Challenger Robin
- Curtiss Canuck
- Curtiss Cleveland
- Curtiss Commercial
- Curtiss Condor
- Curtiss Condor II
- Curtiss Courtney a.k.a. Curtiss-Wright CA-1 Commuter
- Curtiss Crane
- Curtiss Dunkirk Fighter
- Curtiss Eagle
- Curtiss Eagle II
- Curtiss Eagle III
- Curtiss Falcon
- Curtiss Falcon II
- Curtiss Falcon 1910 Biplane
- Curtiss Falcon Conqueror Mailplane
- Curtiss Fledgling
- Curtiss Flying Fish
- Curtiss Freak Boat
- Curtiss Gulfhawk
- Curtiss Hawk I
- Curtiss Hawk II
- Curtiss Hawk III
- Curtiss Hawk IV
- Curtiss Hudson Flyer
- Curtiss Janin Patent Boat
- Curtiss Judson Triplane
- Curtiss Kingbird
- Curtiss Lark
- Curtiss Liberty Battler
- Curtiss Lindbergh Special
- Curtiss Night Mail
- Curtiss Oriole
- Curtiss Osprey
- Curtiss Owl (not O-52)
- Curtiss-Wright Pursuit Osprey
- Curtiss Robin
- Curtiss Seagull MF, 18
- Curtiss Sport Trainer
- Curtiss Tadpole
- Curtiss Tanager
- Curtiss Teal
- Curtiss Thrush
- Curtiss Triad
- Curtiss Valkyrie
- Curtiss Wanamaker Triplane

==== Curtiss number designations ====
(assigned retroactively in 1935, with 75 being first contemporary use of system)

- Curtiss 1 JN-4
- Curtiss 2 R/R-2
- Curtiss 3 Wanamaker Triplane
- Curtiss 4 Commercial
- Curtiss 5 N
- Curtiss 6 America/H/H-1/H-2/H-4/H-8/H-12/H-16
- Curtiss 7 F/FL/Judson Triplane
- Curtiss 8 HS
- Curtiss 9 L
- Curtiss 10 S/Scout/Wireless Scout
- Curtiss 11 Autoplane
- Curtiss 12 NC
- Curtiss 13 BAT
- Curtiss 14 BAP
- Curtiss 15 18B Hornet and 18T Wasp
- Curtiss 16 HA/Dunkirk Fighter
- Curtiss 17 Oriole
- Curtiss 18 MF
- Curtiss 19 Eagle
- Curtiss 20 Crane
- Curtiss 21 PN-1
- Curtiss 22 Cox Racer
- Curtiss 23 CR/R-6
- Curtiss 24 CT
- Curtiss 25 Seagull
- Curtiss 26 Orenco D
- Curtiss 28 TS
- Curtiss 29 SX4-1 Water Glider
- Curtiss 30 Curtiss production of Martin NBS-1 bombers
- Curtiss 31 CS
- Curtiss 32 R2C/R-8 racers
- Curtiss 33 XPW-8/PW-8
- Curtiss 34 P-1/AT-4/AT-5
- Curtiss 35 Hawk
- Curtiss 36 NBS-1
- Curtiss 37 Export Falcon/XF8C-1
- Curtiss 39 F4C/F6C
- Curtiss 40 Carrier Pigeon
- Curtiss 41 Lark
- Curtiss 42 R3C
- Curtiss 43 F7C
- Curtiss 47 Hawk II/Goshawk
- Curtiss 48 Fledgling/N2C
- Curtiss 49 F8C Helldiver
- Curtiss 50A Challenger Robin
- Curtiss 51 Fledgling/N2C
- Curtiss 52 B-2 Condor
- Curtiss 53 CO Condor
- Curtiss 55 Kingbird
- Curtiss 56 Thrush
- Curtiss 57 Teal
- Curtiss 58 F9C Sparrowhawk
- Curtiss 59 A-8/A-10/Shrike
- Curtiss 60 A-8B/A-12/Shrike
- Curtiss 62 O-40 Raven
- Curtiss 63 P-23 Hawk
- Curtiss 64 BF2C-1/XF11C-2
- Curtiss 66 P-31
- Curtiss 67 XF11C-3/XBF2C-1
- Curtiss 68 Hawk IV
- Curtiss 69 S2C
- Curtiss 70 F13C
- Curtiss 71 O3C/SOC Seagull
- Curtiss 72 Falcon II
- Curtiss 73 Falcon
- Curtiss 73 F12C
- Curtiss 75 Hawk/P-36/P-37/Mohawk
- Curtiss 76 A-14/Shrike
- Curtiss 76A A-18/Shrike
- Curtiss 77 SBC
- Curtiss 79 Hawk IV
- Curtiss 81 Hawk/Tomahawk/Kittyhawk/Warhawk/P-40
- Curtiss 82 SO3C Seagull
- Curtiss 84 A-25/SB2C Helldiver
- Curtiss 85 O-52 Owl
- Curtiss 86 P-46
- Curtiss 87 Kittyhawk/Warhawk/P-40
- Curtiss 88 P-53
- Curtiss 90 P-60
- Curtiss 91 P-62
- Curtiss 94 F14C
- Curtiss 95 P-60
- Curtiss 96 BTC
- Curtiss 97 SC Seahawk
- Curtiss 98 BT2C
- Curtiss 99 F15C

==== Curtiss letter designations ====
- Curtiss AB AB-1 to AB-5
- Curtiss AH AH-1 to AH-18
- Curtiss AX-1
- Curtiss BAP
- Curtiss BAT
- Curtiss BT Flying Lifeboat
- Curtiss C C-1 to C-5
- Curtiss C-1 Canada
- Curtiss CB Battleplane
- Curtiss CO Condor
- Curtiss Model D
- Curtiss Model E
- Curtiss EC-1 Scout
- Curtiss Ely 1910 Monoplane
- Curtiss Model F
- Curtiss FL blend of F and L
- Curtiss Model G Scout
- Curtiss GS
- Curtiss Model H
- Curtiss HA Dunkirk Fighter
- Curtiss HS
- Curtiss J
- Curtiss JN
- Curtiss JN Twin
- Curtiss JNH
- Curtiss JNS
- Curtiss K
- Curtiss KPB
- Curtiss KPL
- Curtiss Model L
- Curtiss LXC1
- Curtiss M
- Curtiss MF
- Curtiss Model N
- Curtiss Model O
- Curtiss PN-1 Pursuit Night
- Curtiss Model R 2/R-2
- Curtiss RA
- Curtiss Model S Scout/Wireless Scout
- Curtiss Model T
- Curtiss T-2
- Curtiss T-32 Condor II (Curtiss-Wright CW-4)(USN R4C)(USAAF YC-30)(Company AT-32, BT-32, Connecticut-32)
- Curtiss X-1

==== Curtiss collaborative ventures ====
- Curtiss-Beachey Biplane
- Curtiss-Bleecker SX-5-1 Helicopter
- Curtiss-Cox Cactus Kitten
- Curtiss-Cox Texas Wildcat
- Curtiss-Frisbie
- Curtiss-Goupil Duck
- Curtiss-Herring D
- Curtiss-Ireland Comet
- Curtiss Orenco D
- Curtiss-Reid Rambler
- Curtiss-Robertson CR-1 Skeeter
- Curtiss-Robertson CR-2 Coupe
- Curtiss-Robertson Robin
- Curtiss-Sikorsky-Gluhareff JN-4D
- Curtiss-Sikorsky-Gluhareff Oriole
- Curtiss-SPAD XIII
- Curtiss-Stewart JN-4C
- Curtiss-Stinson

==== Curtiss-Wright ====
Curtiss-Wright, (not to be confused with Curtis Wright)

- Curtiss-Wright 2500 Air-Car
- Curtiss-Wright Aircoach
- Curtiss-Wright Bee
- Curtiss-Wright Bunting I
- Curtiss-Wright Courtney Amphibian
- Curtiss-Wright CA-1 Commuter
- Curtiss-Wright CR-1 Skeeter
- Curtiss-Wright CR-2 Coupe
- Curtiss-Wright CW-1 Junior
- Curtiss-Wright CW-3 Duckling
- Curtiss-Wright CW-4 T-32 Condor II
- Curtiss-Wright CW-6 Sedan/Travel Air 6000/6B
- Curtiss-Wright CW-10 Travel Air 10B
- Curtiss-Wright CW-11
- Curtiss-Wright CW-12 Travel Air 12
- Curtiss-Wright CW-14 Travel Air/Speedwing/Sportsman Deluxe/Osprey
- Curtiss-Wright CW-15 Club Sedan
- Curtiss-Wright CW-16 Travel Air 16
- Curtiss-Wright CW-17 Pursuit Osprey
- Curtiss-Wright CW-18
- Curtiss-Wright CW-19 Coupe/Sparrow
- Curtiss-Wright CW-20 C-46/C-55/C-113 Commando
- Curtiss-Wright CW-21 Demon
- Curtiss-Wright CW-22 SNC Falcon
- Curtiss-Wright CW-23 Coupe
- Curtiss-Wright CW-24 XP-55 Ascender
- Curtiss-Wright CW-24B Flying scale XP-55
- Curtiss-Wright CW-25 AT-9 Jeep
- Curtiss-Wright CW-27 C-76 Caravan
- Curtiss-Wright CW-29 XF-87 Blackhawk
- Curtiss-Wright LXC
- Curtiss Wright Navy Experimental Type C Amphibious Transport
- Curtiss-Wright VZ-7
- Curtiss-Wright X-19 (X-100 and X-200)
- Curtiss-Wright X-100 X-19 development
- Curtiss-Wright X-200 X-19 development

==== Custer ====
(1939: National Aircraft Corp (Fdr: Willard R Custer), Hagerstown, MD, 1951: Construction by Baumann Aircraft Corp, Santa Barbara, CA)

- Custer Channel Wing
- Custer CCW-1
- Custer CCW-2
- Custer CCW-5

==== Custom Flight ====
(Custom Flight Limited, Midland, Ontario, Canada)

- Custom Flight Lite Star
- Custom Flight North Star

==== Cuvelier-Lacroix ====
(Roland Cuvellier, Léon Lacroix)

- Cuvelier LNB.11
- Cuvelier LNB.12
- Cuvelier-Lacroix 2L.12 le Manouche

==== Cuthbertson ====
(Michigan Steel Boat Co, Detroit, MI)

- Cuthbertson 1909 Biplane

==== Cvjetkovic ====
- Cvjetkovic CA-51
- Cvjetkovic CA-61 Mini-Ace
- Cvjetkovic CA-65 Skyfly

==== CVV ====
(Centro Volo a Vela del Politecnico di Milano / Centro Studi ad Ezperienze per il Volo a Vela)

- CVV 1 Pinguino
- CVV 2 Asiago
- CVV 3 Arcore
- CVV 4 Pellicano
- CVV 5 Papero
- CVV 6 Canguro
- CVV 7 Pinocchio
- CVV 8 Linate
- CVV 8 Bonaventura
- CVV PR.2 Saltafossi (Ditch-Hopper)
- CVV PM.280 Tartuca (Tortoise): 1947 low-wing single-seater racer, 60 hp CNA D.4
- CVV PM.80 Tartuca [typo?]
- CVV P.110
- CVV P.111
- CVV P.19 Scricciolo (Wren)
  - CVV P.19Tr – tricycle undercarriage
  - CVV P.19R – (Rimorchio – tug) rebuild with 150 hp Lycoming for use as glider tug

=== CW ===
(CW Helicopter Research)

- CW 205

=== C.W. ===
(C.W. Aircraft Ltd.)

- C.W. Cygnet
- C.W. Cygnet Minor
- C.W. Swan.

==== CWL ====
(Centralne Warsztaty Lotnicze – Central Aviation Workshops)

- WZ-III
- WZ-IV
- CWL WZ-VIII
- CWL WZ-IX
- CWL WZ-X
- CWL SK-1 Słowik (developed from Hannover CL.II)

==== Cyclone ====
(Cyclone Airsports Ltd)

- Cyclone AX2000

==== Cycloplane ====
(Cycloplane Co Ltd (founders: H S "Dick" Myhres, Omer L Woodson), 3781 Angeles Mesa Dr, Los Angeles, CA)

- Wheeler Cycloplane A-1
- Cycloplane C-1
- Cycloplane C-2

==== Cyclops ====
(Zaharoff Aeronautical Corp of America, 55 W 42 St, New York, NY)

- Cyclops Z-II
- Cyclops Z-IV

==== CZAL ====
(Czechoslovakia, late 40s – early 50s)

- CZAL L-60 Brigadyr
- CZAL HC-2 Helibaby

==== CZAW ====
- CZAW Parrot
- CZAW SportCruiser a.k.a. PiperSport
- CZAW Mermaid

==== Czech Sport Aircraft ====
(Czech Sport Aircraft)

- Czech Sport Aircraft Sky Cruiser
- CSA PS-38 Tourer
