= LXC (disambiguation) =

LXC may refer to:

- LXC, an operating-system-level virtualization method
- Curtiss-Wright LXC, the Imperial Japanese Navy Air Service designation
- LX Cycling Team, the UCI code LXC
- Lixian County, the division code LXC (See List of administrative divisions of Sichuan)
