= Crawford CLM =

Type of aircraft

Crawford CLM was an all-metal, single-engine, high-wing transport based on the German Junkers F.13-type wing, produced by Crawford All Metal Aircraft & Motor Company, Los Angeles, California, in 1931. Powered by a Wright Whirlwind radial air-cooled engine of approximately 220 hp. Unique in its closely spaced enclosed landing gear, with large landing lights installed in the forward part. Only one was produced and there were no production orders. It was evaluated by the Mexican Air Force. One photo from the Museum of Alaska Transportation & Industry would seem to indicate that the one prototype was sold to an Alaskan bush plane operator.
