= CSIR Sara II =

SARA II

General information
- Type: Two-seat experimental autogyro
- National origin: South Africa
- Manufacturer: Council for Scientific and Industrial Research
- Number built: 1

History
- First flight: 30 November 1972

The CSIR SARA II (SARA - South African Research Autogyro) is a South African two-seat experimental autogyro designed and built by the Aeronautics Research Unit of the Council for Scientific and Industrial Research.

== Development ==
As part of the support to South African aircraft manufacturing industry the ARU developed a single-seat autogyro as a research vehicle. Design of the autogyro was started in 1965 and construction followed in April 1967, by 1972 the autogyro, registered ZS-UGL, was ready for tethered tests mounted on a lorry-platform, it made its first free flight on 30 November 1972 at Swartkop Air Force Base. Following the test flights the autogyro was modified.

== Design ==
The autogyro had a box-like fuselage structure made from light-alloy and was fitted with twin fins and rudders with a fixed incidence tail-plane mounted between them. It was fitted with a two-bladed teetering rotor, the rotor could be spun up using a shaft drive through a clutch from the engine. The engine located at the rear was a 180 hp (134 kW) Continental O-360-A air-cooled engine driving a two-bladed constant-speed pusher propeller. The crew sat side by side in the enclosed fuselage with dual controls, entrance is through a forward-opening glazed door on each side. The landing gear was a fixed tricycle type with a self-centering and steerable nosewheel.

== Specifications ==
Data from

General characteristics

- Crew: 2
- Length: 4.65 m (15 ft 3 in) fuselage
- Width: 1.2 m (3 ft 11 in)
- Max takeoff weight: 840 kg (1,852 lb)
- Fuel capacity: 136 L (36 US gal; 30 imp gal)
- Powerplant: 1 × Lycoming O-360-A 4-cyl. air-cooled horizontally-opposed piston engine, 130 kW (180 hp)
- Main rotor diameter: 2 × 11.13 m (36 ft 6 in)
- Main rotor area: 97.2 m^{2} (1,046 sq ft) NACA 8-H-12 section teetering rotor
- Propellers: 2-bladed Hartzell constant-speed propeller, 1.83 m (6 ft 0 in) diameter

Performance

- Maximum speed: 154 km/h (96 mph, 83 kn)
- Cruise speed: 122 km/h (76 mph, 66 kn) *Min flying speed: 48 km/h (30 mph)
- Never exceed speed: 193 km/h (120 mph, 104 kn)
- Service ceiling: 4,267 m (13,999 ft)
- Rate of climb: 4.066 m/s (800.4 ft/min)

== See also ==
Related lists

- List of rotorcraft
