= Brown-Young BY-1 =

BY-1
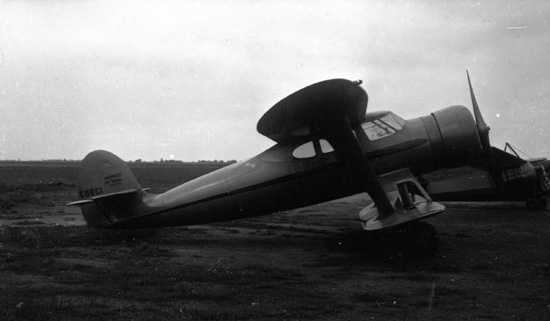

General information
- Type: Cabin biplane
- National origin: United States
- Manufacturer: Columbia Aircraft Co., Tulsa OK
- Designer: Richard E. Young, Willis Brown
- Number built: 1

History
- Introduction date: 1936

The Brown-Young BY-1, also called the Columbia Sesquiplane and the Model 2, was a prototype sesquiplane from Columbia Aircraft Co.

== Design and development ==
Richard E. Young was the inventor of Spiralloy, a directional glass fibre composite material used in high-strength applications. Together with Willis C. Brown he designed and built the BY-1, a four-seat equivalent to the two-seat Luscombe Phantom parasol monoplane. After completion, a smaller lower wing was mounted below the fuselage, converting it to a sesquiplane with backward staggered wings. The lower wing also housed the retractable landing gear main wheels.

The wings were fabric covered, while the fuselage was of all-metal construction and supported the non-retractable tailwheel. A single Jacobs radial engine in the nose drove a two-bladed propeller.

== Operational history ==
The engine from the BY-1 was later installed in the prototype MB-10 trainer. The BY-1 was scrapped at White Rock Airport in Dallas, Texas for materials during the Second World War.

== Specifications (Brown-Young BY-1) ==
Data from (aerofile.com)

General characteristics

- Crew: 1
- Capacity: 3
- Powerplant: 1 × Jacobs L-4 Radial, 225 hp (168 kW)
- Propellers: 2-bladed

== See also ==
Aircraft of comparable role, configuration, and era

- Beechcraft Staggerwing
- Luscombe Phantom
