= Curtiss HA =

HA / Dunkirk Fighter
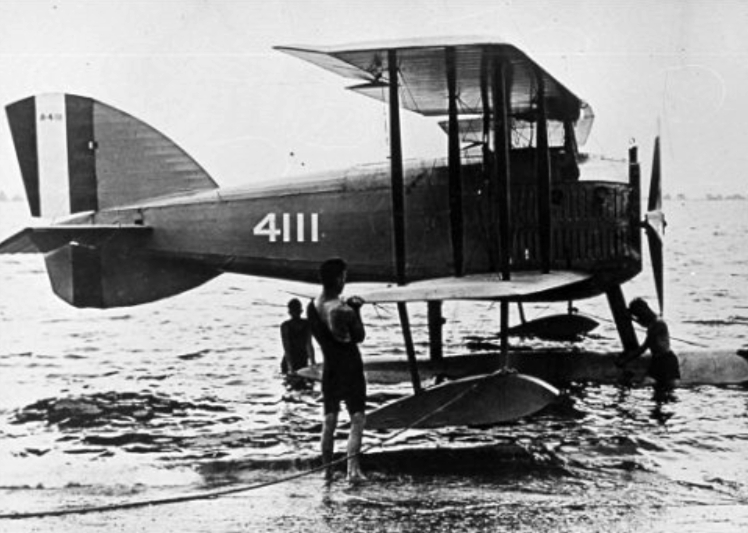
- Curtiss HA-2 (BuNo A4111)

General information
- Type: Fighter/Mail plane
- National origin: United States
- Manufacturer: Curtiss Aeroplane and Motor Company
- Designer: B.L. Smith
- Number built: 6 (3 prototypes, 3 landplane mail planes)

History
- First flight: 21 March 1918

The Curtiss HA (sometimes Dunkirk Fighter) was an American biplane seaplane designed by Captain B.L. Smith of the United States Marine Corps, and built by Curtiss Aeroplane and Motor Company. Despite the nickname, it's unrelated to the 1940 Battle of Dunkirk.

== Development and design ==
The HA was a two-seat biplane with a central float and balancing floats on the wingtips. The fuselage was wood with a fabric covering. The plane was powered by a Liberty 12 engine in the nose. The prototype was ordered in December 1917, and its first flight was on 21 March 1918. During testing the aircraft proved very unstable, with an overly heavy tailplane. The aircraft was destroyed in a crash.

Two more prototypes were ordered, designated HA-1 and HA-2. the HA-1 was constructed of salvaged parts from the original, but its tailplane and radiator were redesigned, and its wings were moved further aft. The HA-1 caught fire during a flight. The HA-2 had a wider wingspan, and performed better, but as the war was almost over, no production order was received.

== Operational history ==
Three landplane versions were used as Mail planes.

== Specifications (HA-2) ==
Data from Angelucci, 1987. pp 116-117.

General characteristics

- Crew: 2
- Length: 30 ft 9 in (9.37 m)
- Wingspan: 42 ft 0 in (12.80 m)
- Height: 11 ft 5 in (3.47 m)
- Wing area: 490 sq ft (45.52 m^{2})
- Empty weight: 2,946 lb (1,336 kg)
- Gross weight: 3,907 lb (1,772 kg)
- Powerplant: 1 × Liberty 12 , 360 hp (270 kW)

Performance

- Maximum speed: 118 mph (190 km/h, 103 kn)
- Rate of climb: 790 ft/min (4.0 m/s)

Armament

- 2 × .30 in (7.62 mm) Marlin machine guns, synchronized
- 2 × .30 in (7.62 mm) Lewis machine guns, in a Scarff ring mount
