= Corcoran 65-1 =

General information
- Type: Twin engine single seat biplane motor glider
- National origin: United States
- Designer: R. S. Corcoran
- Number built: 2

History
- First flight: October 1965

The Corcoran 65-1 was a motor glider of very unusual configuration, a twin engine biplane. It was designed and built in the United States in the 1960s; only two were completed.

== Design and development ==
Since World War I almost all gliders have been monoplanes and almost all motor gliders have had a single engine. The Corcoran 65-1 is one of very few twin engine biplane motor glider designs.

The 65-1 had straight tapered, square tipped wings of equal span. Each was built around a single spar and skinned with aluminium. It was a single bay biplane with, on each side, a single, faired vertical interplane strut and a long bracing strut from the lower fuselage to the upper wing near the top of the interplane strut. The ailerons, fitted on piano hinges on both upper and lower wings, were made of aluminium and unbalanced. Flaps were carried on the upper wing only, filling 60% of its span. They had four positions, with a maximum deflection of 35°.

The flat sided, rectangular cross-section fuselage was aluminium framed and skinned. Its cockpit was enclosed by a single frame canopy, hinged on the port side. Behind the cockpit there was an extended fairing, starting at canopy height and tapering away just behind the wing trailing edge. A short, thin, streamlined pylon reached above it to support the upper wing centre section. Two 8 hp (6 kW) West Bend 82 go-kart engines were mounted behind the fairing on short struts, driving pusher propellers. Fin and rudder were straight tapered and square topped, with the latter extending down to the keel. The constant chord, square tipped tailplane was mounted on top of the fuselage and carried separated elevators, cut away inboard to permit rudder movement. The landing gear comprised a monowheel, fixed but partially faired, a steerable tailwheel and two small balancing outrigger wheels on short, faired struts below the interplane struts.

The 65-1 flew for the first time in October 1965. It was followed by a second prototype (Note: Sources differ on whether a second aircraft was built; Hardy says so but aerofiles list only one. Aerofiles note another, unnamed, Corcoran aircraft, a similarly low powered and all-metal biplane with a 15% bigger span, open cockpit and single engine which first flew in 1970.) which was significantly modified by an increase in wing area of 80% and by moving the previously external engines to within the fuselage, at the same fuselage position as before. The propellers were mounted on outriggers and belt driven.

== Specifications (first prototype) ==
Data from Gliders and Sailplanes

General characteristics

- Crew: One
- Length: 18 ft 6 in (5.64 m)
- Wingspan: 26 ft 0 in (7.92 m) upper and lower wings have equal span
- Height: 5 ft 0 in (1.52 m)
- Wing area: 100 sq ft (9.3 m^{2})
- Aspect ratio: 13.0
- Empty weight: 364 lb (165 kg)
- Max takeoff weight: 550 lb (249 kg)
- Powerplant: 2 × West Bend 820 single cylinder go-kart engines, 8 hp (6.0 kW) each
- Propellers: 2-bladed

Performance

- Maximum speed: 100 mph (160 km/h, 87 kn) power on
- Cruise speed: 67 mph (108 km/h, 58 kn) power on
- Range: 140 mi (230 km, 120 nmi)
