= Curtiss Teal =

Model 57 Teal
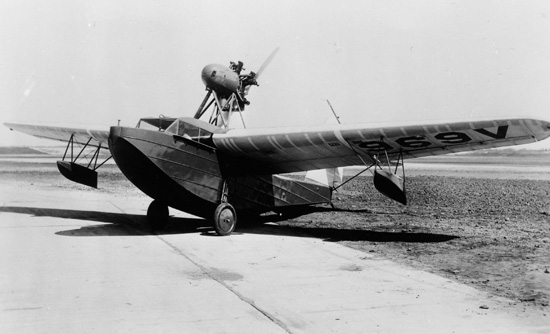

General information
- Type: Monoplane amphibian
- National origin: United States
- Manufacturer: Curtiss Aeroplane and Motor Company
- Number built: 2

History
- First flight: 1930s

The Curtiss Model 57 Teal was an American monoplane amphibian designed and built by the Curtiss Aeroplane and Motor Company. Two versions were built, a three-seater and four-seater but only one of each was built.

The Teal was a monoplane amphibian with the pusher engine pod-mounted above the wing center section. It was designed for the private user, but due to the economic pressures of 1930s America only one three-seater, Teal A-1 registered N969V and a four-seater Teal B-1 registered N970V were built.

== Variants ==
Teal A-1
Three-seater variant with a 165hp (123kW) Wright J6-5 piston engine.
Teal B-1
Four-seater variant with a 225hp (168kW) Wright J-6-7 piston engine.

== Specifications (Teal A-1) ==
Data from

General characteristics

- Crew: one
- Capacity: two passengers
- Length: 30 ft 3 in (9.22 m)
- Wingspan: 45 ft 6 in (13.87 m)
- Height: 11 ft 6 in (3.50 m)
- Wing area: 248 sq ft (23.03 m^{2})
- Empty weight: 2,135 lb (968 kg)
- Powerplant: 1 × Wright J6-5 , 165 hp (123 kW)

Performance

- Maximum speed: 99 mph (160 km/h, 86 kn)
- Cruise speed: 85 mph (137 km/h, 74 kn)
- Range: 450 mi (724 km, 390 nmi)
- Service ceiling: 10,400 ft (3,170 m)
- Rate of climb: 400 ft/min (2.0 m/s)

== See also ==
Related lists

- List of flying boats and floatplanes

== Citations ==
=== Bibliography ===
- Bowers, Peter M. (1979). Curtiss Aircraft 1907–1947. London: Putnam. ISBN 0-370-10029-8.
- The Illustrated Encyclopedia of Aircraft (Part Work). London: Orbis. 1985. OCLC 932622280.
