= Coates Swalesong =

Swalesong
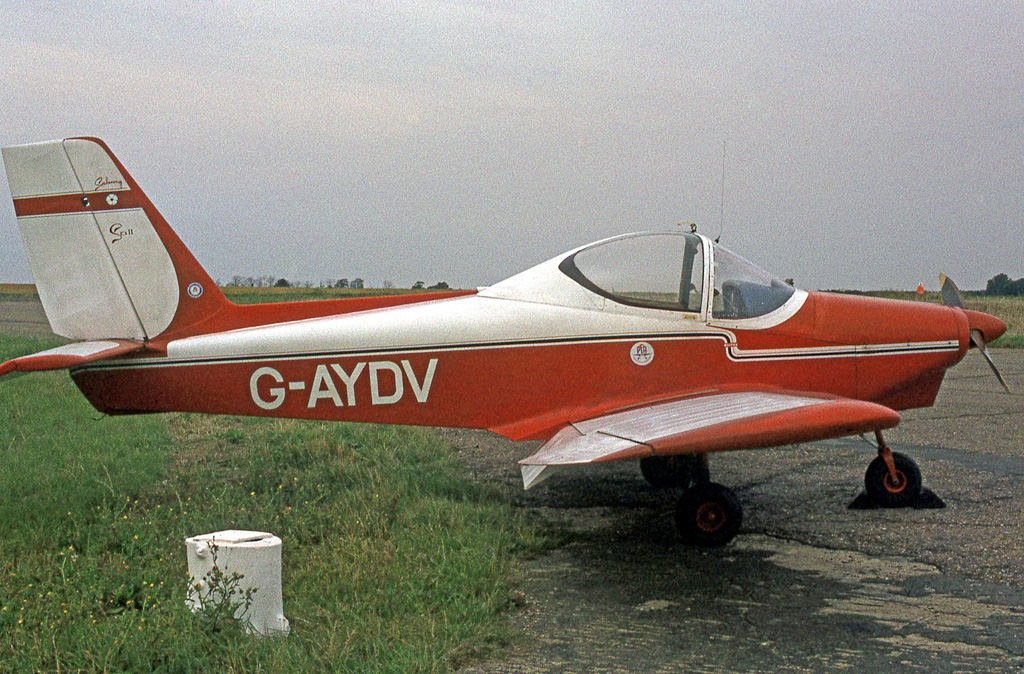
- The Swalesong S.A.II at Bourn Airfield Cambridgeshire in 1982

General information
- Type: Homebuilt monoplane
- Designer: James Ralph Coates
- Status: Preserved
- Primary user: Private pilot owner

History
- First flight: 1973
- Retired: 2007

The Coates Swalesong is a 1970s British two-seat homebuilt monoplane.

== Development and operational history ==
The Swalesong S.A.II was designed and built by J. R. Coates. It is a low-wing wooden construction (spruce with plywood skin) cantilever monoplane with a fixed tricycle undercarriage, with pilot and passenger sitting side-by-side in an enclosed cockpit with a sliding canopy. It first flew on 2 September 1973, powered by a 90 hp (67 kW) Continental PC60 Ground Power Unit converted to Continental C90 standard. A simplified version, the Swalesong S.A.III, was designed for homebuilding, which could be powered by engines of 85–108 hp (63–81 kW).

Only one S.A.II G-AYDV and one simplified S.A.III were built. The Swalesong S.A.II survives at Breighton Airfield, East Yorkshire. The CAA G-INFO website shows that its registration is current in February 2021.

== Variants ==
Swalesong S.A.I
Designation of Luton Minor registration G-AMAW built by Jim Coates in the 1950s, not connected with S.A.II or S.A.III
Swalesong S.A.II
Prototype, one built.
Swalesong S.A.III
Simplified design for amateur construction, one built.

== Specifications (SAII) ==
Data from Jane's All the World's Aircraft 1975–76

General characteristics

- Length: 19 ft 0 in (5.79 m)
- Wingspan: 26 ft 5 in (8.05 m)
- Height: 7 ft 3 in (2.21 m) (overall)
- Wing area: 120 sq ft (11 m^{2})
- Airfoil: NACA 23013.5
- Empty weight: 730 lb (331 kg)
- Max takeoff weight: 1,207 lb (547 kg)
- Fuel capacity: 24 imp gal (29 US gal; 110 L)
- Powerplant: 1 × Continental C90 air-cooled four-cylinder horizontally opposed engine, 90 hp (67 kW)
- Propellers: wooden fixed-pitch-bladed, 5 ft 2 in (1.57 m) diameter

Performance

- Maximum speed: 130 mph (210 km/h, 110 kn) at 1,000 ft (300 m)
- Cruise speed: 95 mph (153 km/h, 83 kn) at 1,000 ft (300 m) (econ. cruise)
- Stall speed: 49 mph (79 km/h, 43 kn) (flaps down)
- Never exceed speed: 170 mph (270 km/h, 150 kn)
- Range: 450 mi (720 km, 390 nmi)
