= Coupé-Aviation JC-01 =

JC-01
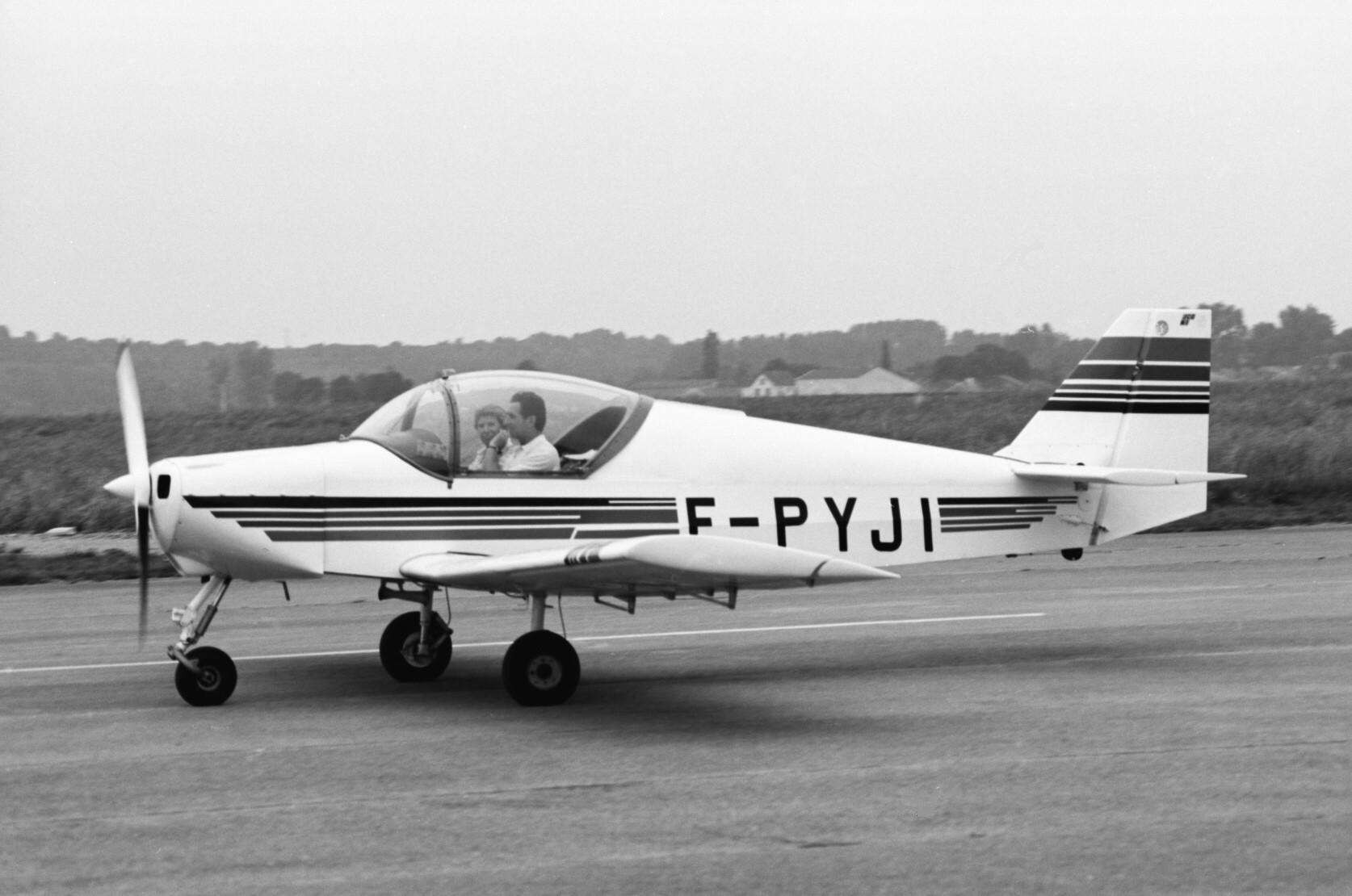

General information
- Type: Two seat ultralight
- National origin: France
- Designer: Jacques Coupé
- Number built: at least 15, all variants

History
- First flight: 16 March 1976

The Coupé-Aviation JC-01 is the first of a series of very similar designs of two seat, single engine sports aircraft, amateur built from plans in France from 1976. These provided a range of engine sizes and undercarriage layouts, but total production was small.

== Design and development ==
The JC-01 and its variants were designed as conventional two-seat side by side light aircraft that could be built from plans by amateurs. The different models are chiefly distinguished by engine choice, though undercarriage configurations vary and there are slight alterations to the vertical surfaces. The J-01 and the J-2 have identical spans, wing areas and lengths, though the J-2, with a 90 hp rather than 65 hp engine and a tricycle rather than conventional undercarriage weighs more: empty, the J-01 weighs 330 kg (728 lb), the J-2 500 kg (1,103 lb).

The J-2 has a constant chord, one piece low wing. Its inner panels have no dihedral but the outer ones are set at 4°. Both the main box spar and the rear spar have spruce booms and plywood webs. The leading edge is ply covered and fitted with fixed slots. The wing, including ailerons and flaps is Dacron covered overall. The empennage of the J-2 is conventional and cantilever, with the horizontal tail mounted on top of the fuselage; both fin and rudder are swept, the latter only slightly. The fixed surfaces are ply covered but control surfaces are fabric covered. The elevator has a trim tab.

The fuselage of the J-2 is a three frame truss structure with a ply covered forward section and fabric covering aft. A 67 kW (90 hp) Continental C90 flat four engine in the nose drives a two-blade, fixed pitch propeller. Its fuel is stored in a tank immediately aft of the engine firewall. The cockpit, placed over the wing, seats two side by side under a large, rearward sliding canopy, with a space behind the seats which can take up to 20 kg (44 lbs) of baggage. The J-2 lands on fixed tricycle gear. The mainwheels have oleo-pneumatic damping and mechanical brakes; the nosewheel swivels.

== Operational history ==
Plans were available to amateur builders for the construction of the JC-01 and its variants and about a dozen JC-01s were built. Two remained on the French civil aircraft register in 2010, together one example of each of the other variants making the total number of all variants built at least fifteen. Some builders included their own name and initials in the aircraft description, for example the Dessevres-Coupé JCD 01 and the Coupé-Brault JCFB 01.

== Variants ==
Data from Jane's All the World's Aircraft 1984/85 and Fox-Papa

JC-01
Original version with 48 kW (65 hp) Continental A65 engine and unswept rudder. Later the prototype was modified with a swept rudder. At least one was built with a Limbach L1700 engine. Tailwheel undercarriage. First flown 16 March 1976.
JC-2
Similar to JC-01 but with a 67 kW (90 hp) Continental C90, 50% heavier, swept vertical tail and tricycle undercarriage. First flown May 1981.
JC-3
Lightened JC-01 with swept vertical tail and 51 kW (68 hp) Limbach L 1700 or 60 kW (80 hp) L 2000 engine.
JC-200
"Refined" version of JC-2 with a 75 kW (100 hp) Rolls-Royce Continental O-200 engine, first flown 18 August 1989.

== Specifications (JC-2) ==
Data from Jane's All the World's Aircraft 1984/85

General characteristics

- Capacity: two
- Length: 6.40 m (21 ft 0 in)
- Wingspan: 8.35 m (27 ft 5 in)
- Wing area: 11.70 m^{2} (125.9 sq ft)
- Aspect ratio: 5.95
- Airfoil: NACA 23012
- Empty weight: 500 kg (1,102 lb)
- Max takeoff weight: 750 kg (1,653 lb)
- Fuel capacity: 90 L (20 Imp gal; 24 US gal)
- Powerplant: 1 × Continental C90 air cooled flat-four, 67 kW (90 hp)
- Propellers: two-bladed fixed pitch wooden

Performance

- Maximum speed: 200 km/h (120 mph, 110 kn)
- Cruise speed: 160 km/h (99 mph, 86 kn) economical
- Stall speed: 45 km/h (28 mph, 24 kn) flaps down
