= CVV 7 Pinocchio =

Italian competition glider

Pinocchio

General information
- Type: Single seat competition glider
- National origin: Italy
- Manufacturer: Centro Volo a Vela, Milan (CVV)
- Designer: Ermenegildo Preti
- Number built: 1

History
- First flight: April 1952

The CVV 7 Pinocchio was a single seat competition glider designed and built in Italy, first flown in 1952 though designed in 1940. Only one was built.

== Design and development ==
The Pinocchio was designed at the Centro Volo a Vela (CVV), or Experimental Soaring Centre, of the Royal Polytechnic of Milan by Gildo Preti in 1940 and its construction was started but then interrupted by World War II. In 1946 students began its completion, though it was not finished until 1951 and first flew in April 1952 at Linate, piloted by Riccardo Brigliadori.

For an all wood aircraft the Pinocchio had a high aspect ratio wing, cantilevered, straight tapered on both edges and with semi-elliptical tips. This was built around a single spar with a plywood skinned D-box ahead of it and fabric covering behind. Ailerons reached from the tips to about half span and inboard of them there were airbrakes, mounted at mid-chord, which extended above and below the wings.

The Pinocchio was a high wing aircraft, with the wing mounted on top of the rear fuselage. This was slender, circular in cross section and plywood skinned. The cockpit, with a frameless canopy, was placed immediately ahead of the wing leading edge, its top level with the wing's upper surface. Without a landing skid, the Pinocchio landed on a retractable, sprung monowheel and tail bumper. Its horizontal tail was mounted on top of the fuselage, far enough forward to place the trailing edges of the fabric covered elevators at the rudder hinge. The fin was straight edged and small but the rudder was full, curved and balanced.

Only one Pinocchio was built.

== Specifications ==
Data from Italian Vintage Sailplanes

General characteristics

- Crew: One
- Length: 7.75 m (25 ft 5 in)
- Wingspan: 18.50 m (60 ft 8 in)
- Wing area: 18 m^{2} (190 sq ft)
- Aspect ratio: 19
- Airfoil: root: NACA 4415; tip: NACA 2R12(sic)
- Empty weight: 222 kg (489 lb)
- Gross weight: 320 kg (705 lb)

Performance

- Maximum glide ratio: estimated 33:1
- Wing loading: 17.80 kg/m^{2} (3.65 lb/sq ft)
