= Curtiss XNBS-4 =

American bomber prototype

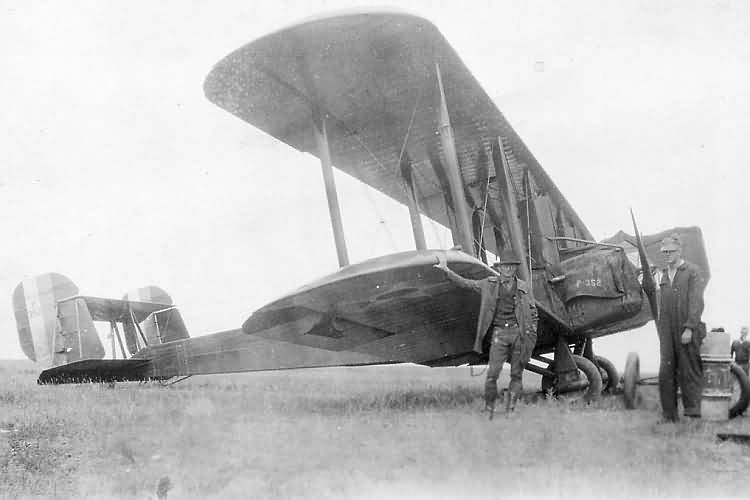

General information
- Type: Biplane night bomber
- National origin: United States
- Manufacturer: Curtiss Aeroplane and Motor Company
- Primary user: United States Army Air Corps
- Number built: 2

History
- First flight: 1924
- Developed from: Martin NBS-1

The Curtiss XNBS-4 (or Curtiss Model 36) was a 1920s prototype biplane night bomber built by the Curtiss Aeroplane and Motor Company for the United States Army Air Corps.

== Development ==
The XNBS-4 was developed by Curtiss as an improvement on the Martin NBS-1. Two prototypes, AS68571 and AS68572, were built. The design did not enter production because it offered no significant improvement over the NBS-1.

== Specifications ==
Data from National Museum of the United States Air Force and Aerofiles

General characteristics

- Crew: 4
- Length: 46 ft 6 in (14.17 m)
- Wingspan: 90 ft 2 in (27.48 m)
- Height: 15 ft 9 in (4.80 m)
- Airfoil: Curtiss C-72
- Gross weight: 13,795 lb (6,257 kg)
- Powerplant: 2 × Liberty L-12A V-12 water-cooled piston engines, 435 hp (324 kW) each

Performance

- Maximum speed: 100 mph (160 km/h, 87 kn) at sea level
- Cruise speed: 95 mph (153 km/h, 83 kn)
- Stall speed: 53 mph (85 km/h, 46 kn)
- Range: 620 mi (1,000 km, 540 nmi)
- Service ceiling: 13,000 ft (4,000 m)

Armament

- Guns: 5x 0.3 in (7.62 mm) machine-guns
- Bombs: 1,907 lb (865.0 kg)
