= Collins Dipper =

American homebuilt aircraft

Dipper

General information
- Type: Homebuilt aircraft
- National origin: United States
- Manufacturer: Collins Aero
- Status: Production completed
- Number built: One

History
- First flight: 1982
- Developed from: Cessna 150

The Collins Dipper was an American homebuilt flying boat that was designed and produced by Collins Aero of Chadds Ford, Pennsylvania and first flown in 1982. The aircraft was supplied in the form of plans for amateur construction. Only one was built and none remain registered.

== Design and development ==
The Dipper was a conversion of a Cessna 150, adding a fiberglass hull and nose to the Cessna land plane. Development was protracted and started in 1964, leading to a first flight in 1982.

The Dipper featured a strut-braced high-wing, a two-seats-in-side-by-side configuration enclosed cockpit with doors, retractable tricycle landing gear and a single engine in pusher configuration mounted above the cabin on struts.

The aircraft is made from aluminum and fiberglass, retaining the Cessna 150's wing and lift struts. The 33.4 ft (10.2 m) span wing employs a NACA 2412 airfoil, mounts flaps and has a wing area of 160 sq ft (15 m^{2}). The standard engine used was the 180 hp (134 kW) Lycoming O-360 powerplant.

The aircraft nose wheel retracted forward and the main landing gear retracted upwards into the rear window space.

The Dipper had a typical empty weight of 1,100 lb (500 kg) and a gross weight of 1,760 lb (800 kg), giving a useful load of 660 lb (300 kg). With full fuel of 39 U.S. gallons (150 L; 32 imp gal) the payload for pilot, passengers and baggage is 426 lb (193 kg).

The manufacturer estimated the conversion time from the plans as 1000 hours.

== Operational history ==
In 1998, the company reported that 13 sets of plans had been sold and one aircraft was flying.

By December 2013, no examples remained registered in the United States with the Federal Aviation Administration.

== Specifications (Dipper) ==
Data from AeroCrafter and The Incomplete Guide to Airfoil Usage

General characteristics

- Crew: one
- Capacity: one passenger
- Length: 25 ft 5 in (7.75 m)
- Wingspan: 33 ft 5 in (10.19 m)
- Wing area: 160 sq ft (15 m^{2})
- Airfoil: NACA 2412
- Empty weight: 1,100 lb (499 kg)
- Gross weight: 1,760 lb (798 kg)
- Fuel capacity: 39 U.S. gallons (150 L; 32 imp gal)
- Powerplant: 1 × Lycoming O-360 four cylinder, air-cooled, four stroke aircraft engine, 180 hp (130 kW)
- Propellers: 2-bladed wooden

Performance

- Maximum speed: 125 mph (201 km/h, 109 kn)
- Cruise speed: 115 mph (185 km/h, 100 kn)
- Stall speed: 50 mph (80 km/h, 43 kn)
- Range: 400 mi (640 km, 350 nmi)
- Service ceiling: 18,000 ft (5,500 m)
- Rate of climb: 1,400 ft/min (7.1 m/s)
- Wing loading: 11.0 lb/sq ft (54 kg/m^{2})
