= Seahawk Condor =

American ultralight aircraft

Condor

General information
- Type: Ultralight aircraft
- National origin: United States
- Manufacturer: Seahawk Industries; Condor Aircraft
- Status: Production completed

History
- Developed from: Eipper Quicksilver

The Seahawk Condor is an American ultralight aircraft that was designed by Buddy Head, Bob Carswell and Dave French and produced by Seahawk Industries and later by Condor Aircraft. The aircraft was supplied as a kit for amateur construction.

== Design and development ==
The aircraft was designed to comply with the US FAR 103 Ultralight Vehicles rules, including the category's maximum empty weight of 254 lb (115 kg). The aircraft has a standard empty weight of 240 lb (109 kg). It features a cable-braced high-wing, open cockpit, tricycle landing gear and a single engine in pusher configuration. The aircraft closely resembles the contemporary Quicksilver MX.

The aircraft is made from bolted-together aluminum tubing, with the wings and tail surfaces covered in Dacron sailcloth. Its 32 ft (9.8 m) span wing is cable-braced from a single tube kingpost. The landing gear does not incorporate suspension. The standard powerplant supplied was the Kawasaki 440 which produces 40 hp (30 kW). The aircraft has a power-off glide ratio of 7:1.

The reported assembly time from the factory-supplied kit is 75 hours.

The aircraft was produced in two versions, the Condor II and III.

== Variants ==
Condor II
Basic single seat model
Condor III
Two seats in side-by-side configuration model with structurally strengthening. The Condor III employs a benchseat and a single shared set of controls and so can be used by heavier pilots as well as for training.

== Specifications (Condor III) ==
Data from Cliche

General characteristics

- Crew: one
- Capacity: one passenger
- Wingspan: 32 ft (9.8 m)
- Wing area: 168 sq ft (15.6 m^{2})
- Empty weight: 240 lb (109 kg)
- Gross weight: 545 lb (247 kg)
- Fuel capacity: 5 U.S. gallons (19 L; 4.2 imp gal)
- Powerplant: 1 × Kawasaki 440 twin-cylinder, in-line, two-stroke snowmobile engine, 40 hp (30 kW)

Performance

- Cruise speed: 55 mph (89 km/h, 48 kn)
- Stall speed: 19 mph (31 km/h, 17 kn)
- Never exceed speed: 60 mph (97 km/h, 52 kn)
- g limits: +5/-3 (calculated)
- Maximum glide ratio: 7:1
- Rate of climb: 775 ft/min (3.94 m/s)
- Wing loading: 3.24 lb/sq ft (15.8 kg/m^{2})
