= Cook Challenger =

JC-1 Challenger

General information
- Type: Cabin Monoplane
- Manufacturer: Cook Aircraft Corporation
- Designer: John Cook
- Number built: 4

History
- First flight: May 1969

The Cook JC-1 Challenger was a 1960s American cabin monoplane built by the Cook Aircraft Corporation.

== Development ==
John Cook founded the Cook Aircraft Corporation in 1968 at Torrance, California to build and market his JC-1 Challenger cabin monoplane design.

The Challenger was a low-winged cantilever four-seat monoplane with an all-metal construction. It was powered by a single 150 horsepower (110 kW) Lycoming O-320 piston engine and had a fixed nosewheel undercarriage. Two prototypes were built, the first aircraft flew in May 1969. A third prototype was built in 1971 but crashed in 1972 killing the pilot Cook. A fourth modified prototype was built by the company but was never certified and the company stop all design and development in the mid 1970s.

== Specifications ==
Data from Jane's All The World's Aircraft 1971–72

General characteristics

- Crew: 1
- Capacity: 3 passengers
- Length: 22 ft 0 in (6.71 m)
- Wingspan: 27 ft 0 in (8.23 m)
- Height: 8 ft 0 in (2.44 m)
- Wing area: 131.2 sq ft (12.19 m^{2})
- Aspect ratio: 5.7:1
- Airfoil: NACA 23015
- Empty weight: 1,180 lb (535 kg)
- Max takeoff weight: 2,150 lb (975 kg)
- Fuel capacity: 40 US gal (150 L; 33 imp gal)
- Powerplant: 1 × Lycoming O-320-E2A air-cooled horizontally opposed piston engine, 150 hp (110 kW)
- Propellers: 2-bladed Sensenich metal fixed pitch, 6 ft 2 in (1.88 m) diameter

Performance

- Maximum speed: 150 mph (240 km/h, 130 kn)
- Cruise speed: 125 mph (201 km/h, 109 kn) at 7,000 ft (2,135 m) (econ cruise)
- Stall speed: 54 mph (87 km/h, 47 kn) flaps down
- Never exceed speed: 185 mph (298 km/h, 161 kn)
- Range: 691 mi (1,112 km, 600 nmi)
- Service ceiling: 15,000 ft (4,600 m)
- Rate of climb: 700 ft/min (3.6 m/s)
- Take-off run to 50 ft (15 m): 1,020 ft (310 m)
- Landing run from 50 ft (15 m): 1,020 ft (310 m)
