= CPA 1 =

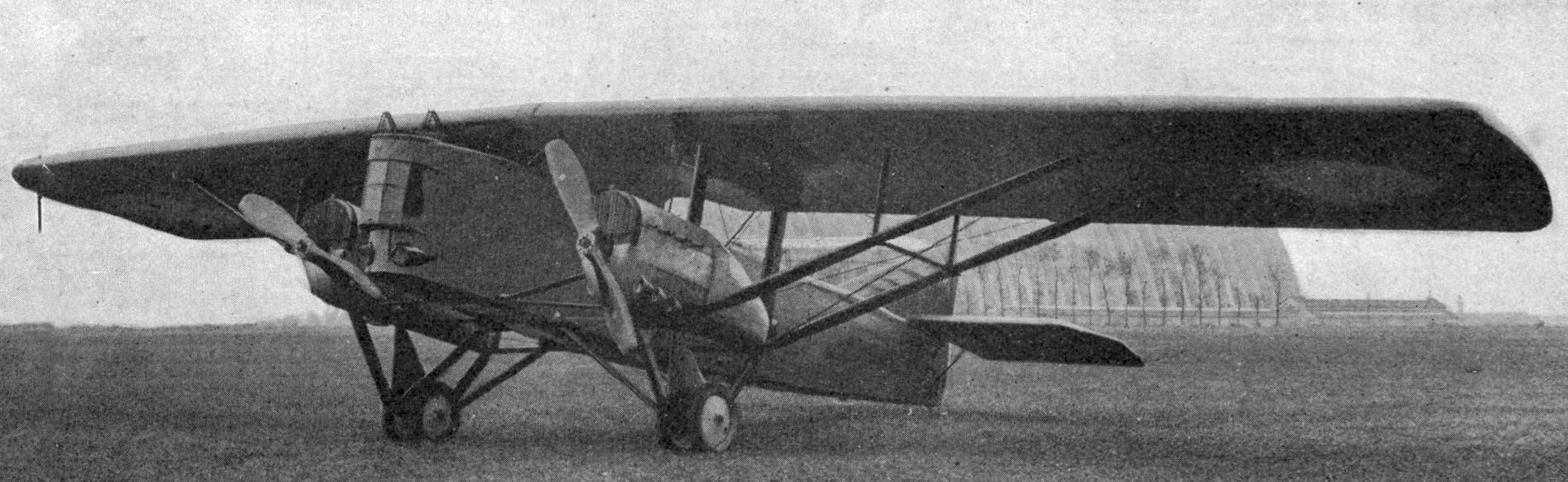

General information
- Type: Heavy bomber aircraft
- National origin: France
- Manufacturer: Chantiers de Provence-Aviation (C.P.A.)
- Designer: de Boysson and Desgrandschamps
- Number built: 2

History
- First flight: 8 January 1926

The CPA 1 was a French twin-engined, parasol-winged bomber designed and built in the mid-1920s.

== Design and development ==
The CPA 1 had a two part, braced wing of constant thickness and chord which was straight-edged and swept at about 7°, built around two wooden spars and fabric covered. There was no dihedral. The trailing edges were filled with ailerons and inboard, camber-changing flaps.

Its fuselage was rectangular in section, with a wooden frame which was wire cross-braced internally and ply-covered forward, with fabric covering aft. The wings were mounted over the fuselage on four vertical cabane struts and were braced with a pair of sloping parallel struts on each side between the wing spars and the engine-bearing frames. The latter were each attached to the fuselage with three more sets of struts, two to the lower fuselage and one to its upper longeron, as well as pairs of vertical struts to the wing undersides. The CAP 1 had two 340 kW (450 hp) water-cooled Hispano-Suiza 12Jb V12 engines housed in long cowlings with front-mounted radiators; the fuel tanks were in the wings but oil reservoirs were placed in the engine housings.

Aft of the CPA 1's semi-cylindrical nose there was a cabin about 5 m (16 ft) long for the observer. It had a forward facing window and a frame that could hold forty 10 kg (22 lb) or ten 50 kg (110 lb) bombs, deployed through ventral openings. It also had an open gun position in the nose and was equipped for vertical and oblique photography. The pilot's cockpit was under the wing trailing edge with a rear-gunner's position close behind, equipped with demountable dual controls, upward-firing machine guns on a flexible mount and a ventral hatch for another gun-mounting covering the lower rear field of fire.

Its tailplane was unswept, with constant chord and angled tips, and was mounted on top of the fuselage, braced from below with pairs of struts. It carried narrow-chord elevators. The fin was broad and almost triangular and mounted a vertically edged, unbalanced rudder which reached down to the keel. The incidence of both fin and tailplane could be adjusted in flight to compensate for changes in centre of gravity or throttle setting.

The CAP 1 had a conventional, fixed tailskid undercarriage, with independent pairs of mainwheels below the engines; each pair was mounted on two sets of V-struts, one vertical to the engine-bearing frame and the other to the lower fuselage longeron.

The CPA 1 was first flown on 8 January 1926, beginning its development at Orly immediately afterwards. On 8 March the aircraft was flown by pilot Tache to Villacoublay to continue testing overseen by the S.T.Aé (Aircraft Technical Service), a government body responsible for certification. In November it was joined by a second example of the CPA 1. Their later history is unknown.

== Specifications ==
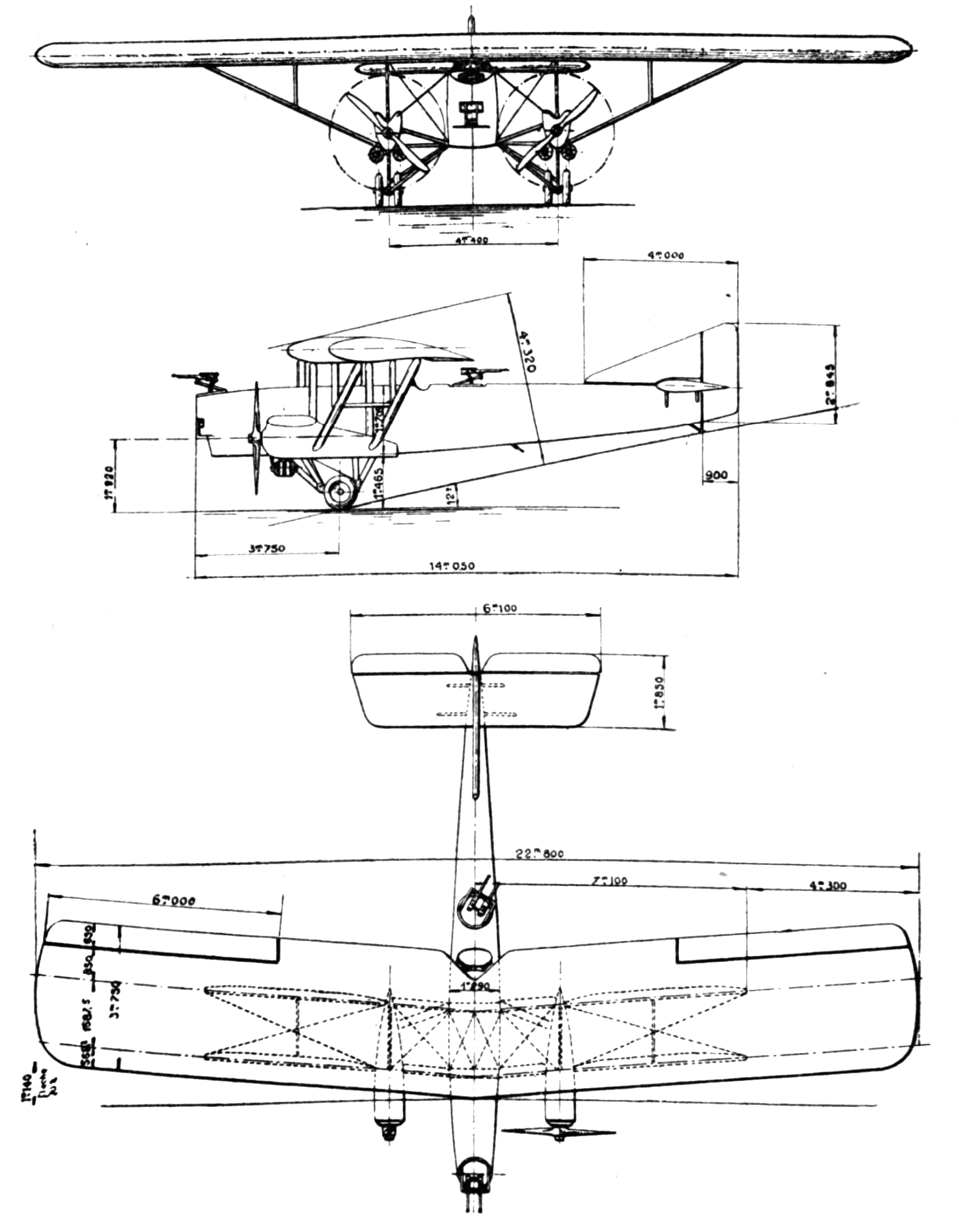
CPA 1 3-view drawing from L'Aéronautique May,1926

Data from Les Ailes, December 1925 The performance figures are calculated at a weight of 4,200 kg (9,300 lb).

General characteristics

- Crew: Three
- Length: 13.35 m (43 ft 10 in)
- Wingspan: 22.80 m (74 ft 10 in)
- Height: 4.32 m (14 ft 2 in)
- Wing area: 84 m^{2} (900 sq ft)
- Empty weight: 3,000 kg (6,614 lb)
- Gross weight: 4,200 kg (9,259 lb)
- Max takeoff weight: 4,960 kg (10,935 lb)
- Fuel capacity: 900 L (200 imp gal; 240 US gal)
- Powerplant: 2 × Hispano-Suiza 12Jb water-cooled V12, 340 kW (450 hp) each
- Propellers: 2-bladed wooden

Performance

- Maximum speed: 210 km/h (130 mph, 110 kn) at ground level
- Stall speed: 90 km/h (56 mph, 49 kn) minimum speed at ground level
- Service ceiling: 7,500 m (24,600 ft)

Armament

- Guns: 6× Lewis guns in total, a pair in the nose and a pair each in of the upper and lower rear positions.
- Bombs: 10×50 kg (110 lb) or 40×10 kg (22 lb) with 2 flares.

== Bibliography ==
- Cortet, Pierre & Passingham, Malcolm (July 1998). "Les Avions de Boysson" [Boysson's Aircraft]. Avions: Toute l'aéronautique et son histoire (in French) (64): 35–40. ISSN 1243-8650.
