= Cukurs C.6bis =

Latvian dive bomber prototype

General information
- Type: Dive bomber
- Manufacturer: Herberts Cukurs
- Designer: Herberts Cukurs
- Primary user: Latvian Air Force
- Number built: 1

History
- Introduction date: 1940
- First flight: 1940

Cukurs C.6bis was a Latvian prototype dive bomber aircraft designed by Herberts Cukurs in 1940.

== Development ==
The aircraft was based on the Cukurs C.6 Trīs zvaigznes (Three stars) trainer which was known for its 1937 flight from Riga to Tokyo and return.

Work on the C.6bis started in 1939, with the first test flights in 1940. Soon after first test flights the Latvian Air Force accepted the aircraft and ordered twelve.

Test flights were halted on the 7 June 1940, just 10 days before the Soviet occupation of Latvia in 1940. During the occupation the Red Army expressed interest in the C.6bis and test flew it, but they determined that it was unsuitable for use.

Only one example was built and its fate remains unknown.

== Specifications (C.6bis) ==
Data from Airwar.ru

General characteristics

- Crew: two
- Length: 8.50 m (27 ft 11 in)
- Wingspan: 11.00 m (36 ft 1 in)
- Height: 2.40 m (7 ft 10 in)
- Wing area: 12.80 m^{2} (137.8 sq ft)
- Empty weight: 680 kg (1,499 lb)
- Max takeoff weight: 1,340 kg (2,954 lb)
- Powerplant: 1 × Hispano Suiza 6 Mb six cylinder liquid-cooled in-line piston aircraft engine, 210 kW (280 hp)

Performance

- Maximum speed: 440 km/h (270 mph, 240 kn)
- Range: 680 km (420 mi, 370 nmi)
- Service ceiling: 5,800 m (19,000 ft)

Armament

- Bombs: 50 kg each
