= Cycloplane C-1 =

1930s American glider training aircraft

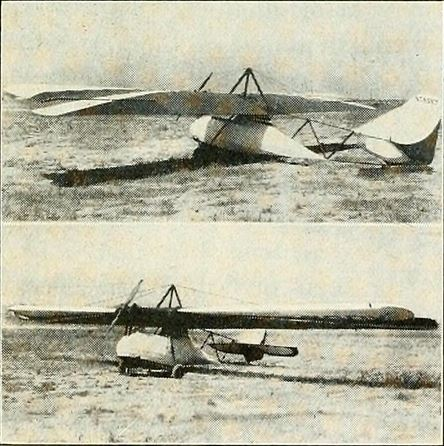

General information
- Type: Primary trainer
- National origin: U.S.
- Manufacturer: Cycloplane Co. Ltd., Los Angeles
- Designer: Omer Woodson
- Number built: 6

History
- First flight: c.1931

The Cycloplane C-1 was a motorized, open-frame primary glider built in the U.S. in the early 1930s. Six, including a single cleaned-up version, the C-2, were built. Two more were built as the Champion B-1.

== Design and development ==
The Cycloplane C-1 was a motorized open-frame primary glider built in the U.S. in 1931–1932. It provided the third and final stage in a three aircraft progression for students to their first solo flight. All were powered variants of the high wing, open frame primary gliders widely used for training in the early 1930s, with flat truss fuselages, mostly uncovered and wire braced for lateral rigidity. The first stage was with an instructor in a two-seater capable only of long hops. The second aircraft had small wings and could not fly but, with a flexible undercarriage, could respond to ailerons and rudder. The student, having established a feel for the controls, now moved to the C-1.

The C-1's wooden wings were rectangular in plan out to blunted tips, built around spars with truss-type ribs and ply-covered leading edges. The wings were overall fabric covered. The airfoil section used was Göttingen 398. A general arrangement diagram shows unbalanced ailerons but some photographs show overhung, balanced surfaces.

Its fuselage had a welded steel tube structure which was flat and uncovered aft of the wings and cockpit. The wings were mounted on the upper flat-frame tube, from which three short struts provided, along with the lower fuselage, attachment points for wing-bracing wires. The forward part of the frame carried a rounded fuselage containing the open cockpit; this forward part was fabric covered. All Cycloplanes were powered by a small flat twin two stroke engine producing 22 hp (16 kW), projecting forwards from the underside of the wing leading edge. The tail was conventional with a triangular tailplane attached to the upper fuselage member and carrying rounded elevators. The fin was also triangular in profile and a generous rudder, which reached down to the lower fuselage member, was also straight-edged, though with a blunted tip.

The C-1's landing gear had small wheels on a straight, coil-sprung axle held close the fuselage underside. Purchasers could choose between a small, steerable tailwheel or a fixed skid to match their landing fields.

== Operational history ==
The first of Woodford's designs was the A-1, which flew in 1930. Little is known about it, though it may have been the two seat starter. Six C-1s were completed, together with one example of the cleaned-up C-2. Two Champion B-2s were also completed. Neither the A-1 or the B-2 is well documented and no sources mention a B-1.

== Variants ==
Data from Aerofiles

A-1
Prototype, 1930. One only.
C-1
1931, six built.
C-2
1931, Cleaned up version, one built.
Champion B-2
Similar, 1932, version built by Champion. Two built.

== Specifications ==
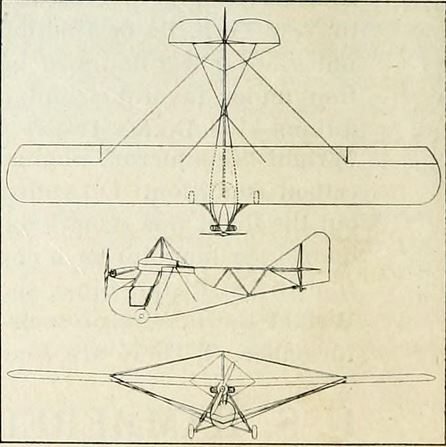
Cycloplane C-1

Data from Aero Digest

General characteristics

- Crew: one
- Length: 19 ft 5 in (5.92 m)
- Wingspan: 39 ft 9 in (12.12 m)
- Height: 7 ft 8 in (2.34 m)
- Wing area: 193 sq ft (17.9 m^{2})
- Airfoil: Göttingen 398
- Empty weight: 430 lb (195 kg)
- Gross weight: 670 lb (304 kg)
- Fuel capacity: 8 US gal (6.7 imp gal; 30 L)
- Powerplant: 1 × Cyclomotor flat twin two stroke, 22.5 hp (16.8 kW) at 2,350 rpm
- Propellers: 2-bladed

Performance

- Maximum speed: 68 mph (109 km/h, 59 kn)
- Cruise speed: 60 mph (97 km/h, 52 kn)
- Range: 200 mi (320 km, 170 nmi)
- Landing speed: 20 mph (32 km/h; 17 kn)
