= Croses Pouplume =

Pouplume
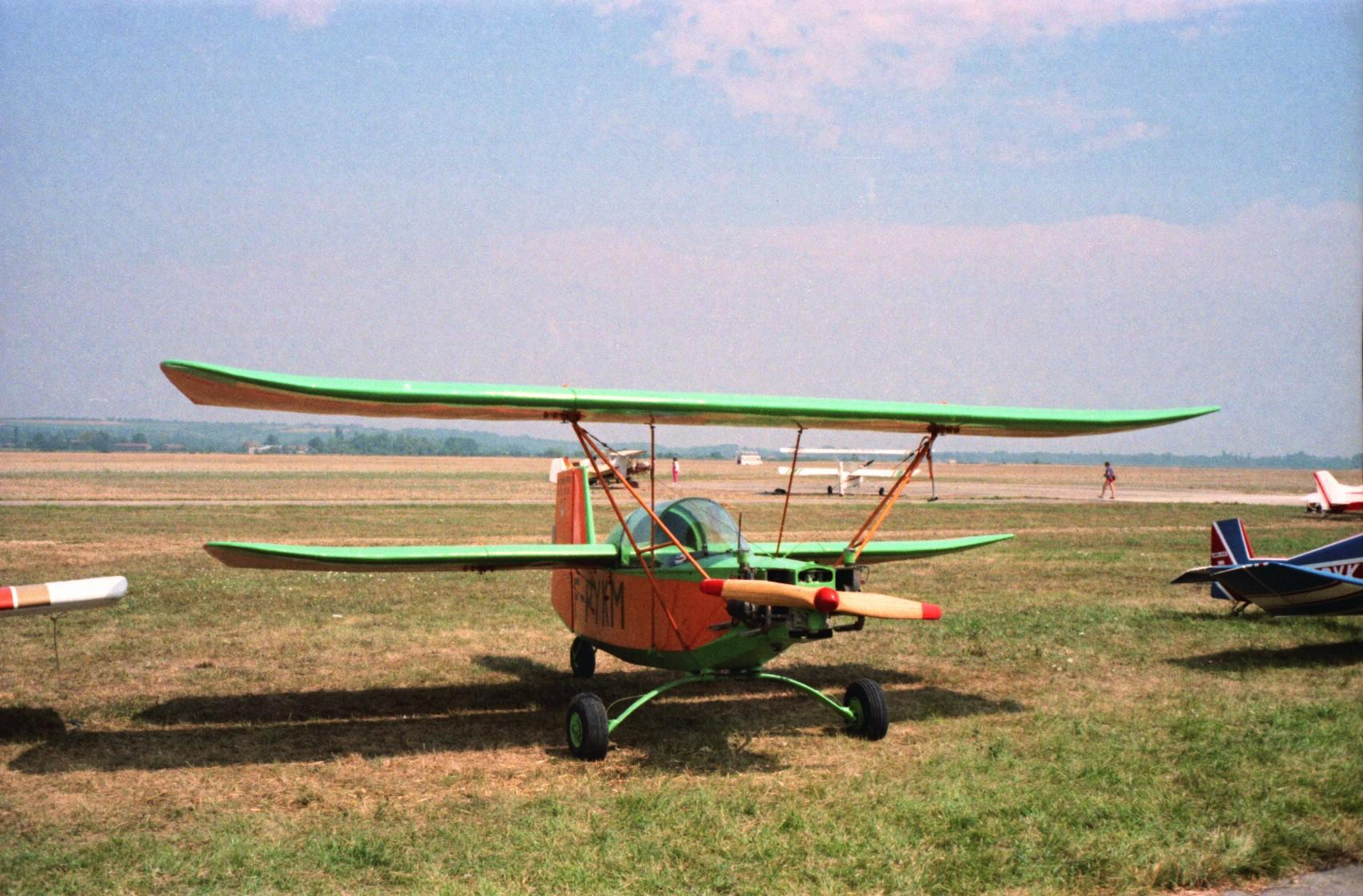
- EC-3S Pouplume Sport (F-PYKM)

General information
- Type: Ultralight
- Manufacturer: homebuilt
- Designer: Emilien Croses

History
- First flight: 1960

The Croses Pouplume ("lousefeather") was an unusual ultralight aircraft developed in France in the 1960s. It was inspired by Henri Mignet's Pou-du-Ciel design with its distinctive tandem wing layout. Croses set out to develop a similar aircraft, to be powered by a single-cylinder motorcycle engine of around 6 kW (8 hp). Construction was wood with fabric covering. The resulting machine, designated the EC-1 weighed only 108 kg (238 lb) empty, and first flew in about 1960. Like the Pou-du-Ciel, the Pouplume dispensed with traditional ailerons and elevators, and pivoted the entire forward wing to provide pitch control.

The EC-1 was followed by the EC-2, a two-seat version powered by a conventional aero-engine, and the EAC-3, the definitive version marketed for homebuilding, again powered by a motorcycle engine. By 1977, at least twelve examples of the EAC-3 had flown. A further development, the Pouplume Sport was designed to be powered by a 1500 cc Volkswagen air-cooled engine, and featured wings of reduced span. In 1977, about 55 of this version were known to be under construction.

== Variants ==
Croses EC-1 Pouplume
Single seat
Croses EC-2 Pouplume
Two seat
Croses EAC-3 Pouplume
Homebuilt version
Croses Pouplume Sport
VW powered

== Specifications (typical EC-3) ==
General characteristics

- Crew: One pilot
- Length: 4.70 m (15 ft 3 in)
- Wingspan: 7.8 m (25 ft 7 in)
- Height: 1.80 m (5 ft 11 in)
- Wing area: 16.0 m^{2} (172 sq ft)
- Empty weight: 110 kg (243 lb)
- Gross weight: 220 kg (485 lb)
- Powerplant: 1 × Monet-Goyon motorcycle engine , 6.0 kW (8.0 hp)

Performance

- Maximum speed: 70 km/h (44 mph, 38 kn)
