= SAB C-100 Vulcan =

Italian ultralight aircraft

C-100 Vulcan
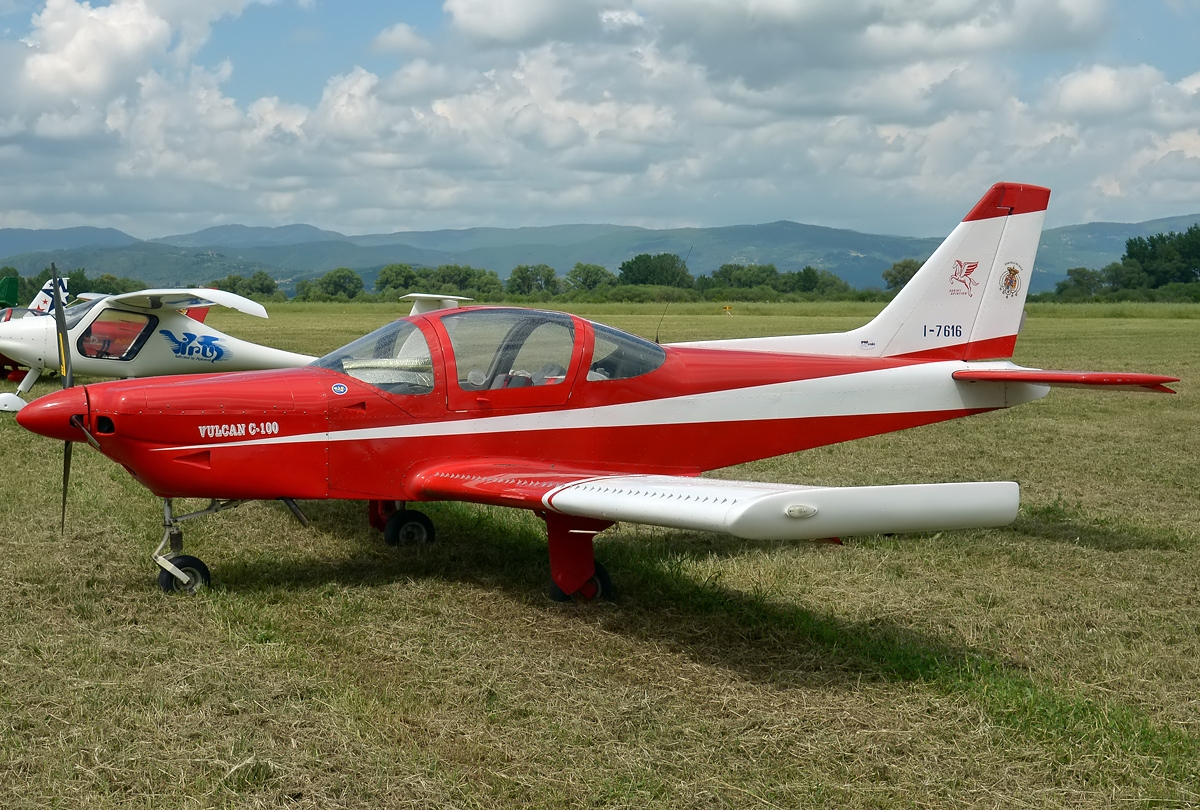

General information
- Type: Ultralight aircraft and Light-sport aircraft
- National origin: Italy
- Manufacturer: SAB Aviation
- Status: In production (2012)

The SAB C-100 Vulcan (or C 100) is an Italian ultralight and light-sport aircraft produced by SAB Aviation of Benevento. The aircraft is supplied as a kit for amateur construction or as a complete ready-to-fly-aircraft.

== Design and development ==
SAB Aviation purchased Corivi Aviation and their design, the Corivi Pegaso, and the Pegaso was further refined into the C-100 Vulcan.

The Vulcan was designed to comply with the Fédération Aéronautique Internationale microlight rules and US light-sport aircraft rules. It features a cantilever low wing, a two-seats-in-side-by-side configuration enclosed cockpit under a bubble canopy, fixed or optionally retractable tricycle landing gear and a single engine in tractor configuration.

The aircraft is made from sheet aluminum. Its 8.0 m (26.2 ft) span wing has an area of 10.61 m^{2} (114.2 sq ft) and mounts flaps. The standard engine available is the 100 hp (75 kW) Rotax 912ULS four-stroke powerplant.

The retractable gear version, with its pneumatic retraction mechanism, is intended for the European microlight market, whereas the fixed gear model is sold in the United States in the LSA category. The LSA version was first shown at Sun 'n Fun in 2010.

The design has been accepted by the Federal Aviation Administration as a special light-sport aircraft.

== Specifications (C-100 Vulcan) ==
Data from Bayerl

General characteristics

- Crew: one
- Capacity: one passenger
- Wingspan: 8.0 m (26 ft 3 in)
- Wing area: 10.61 m^{2} (114.2 sq ft)
- Empty weight: 282 kg (622 lb)
- Gross weight: 450 kg (992 lb)
- Fuel capacity: 96 litres (21 imp gal; 25 US gal)
- Powerplant: 1 × Rotax 912ULS four cylinder, liquid and air-cooled, four stroke aircraft engine, 75 kW (101 hp)

Performance

- Maximum speed: 250 km/h (160 mph, 130 kn)
- Cruise speed: 230 km/h (140 mph, 120 kn)
- Stall speed: 62 km/h (39 mph, 33 kn)
- Rate of climb: 4 m/s (790 ft/min)
- Wing loading: 42.4 kg/m^{2} (8.7 lb/sq ft)
