= Aerodis AA200 Orion =

Type of aircraft

AA200 Orion

General information
- Type: light aircraft
- National origin: USA
- Manufacturer: Aerodis
- Designer: David Thurston

History
- First flight: April 7, 1991

The Aerodis AA200 Orion is a four-seat prototype light aircraft designed in the United States and which first flew on April 7, 1991. Aerodis commissioned the design with the intention of developing a family of related aircraft sharing a common basic airframe, including the AA300 Rigel and AA330 Theta. Aerodis was also the American distributor for the Grinvalds Orion, a French light aircraft intended for homebuilding. Although the Aerodis Orion and Grinvalds Orion shared a same basic configuration and composite construction, the two aircraft were not further related, and the AA200 was an all-new design. The designs are sometimes known as the CRSS AA200 Orion, CRSS AA300 Rigel, and CRSS AA330 Theta after the rights to the designs were sold to Indonesian manufacturer CRSS.

== Design and development ==
The Orion is a low-wing cantilever monoplane with a T-tail, prominent ventral fin, and retractable, tricycle undercarriage. It is powered by a mid-mounted piston engine driving a pusher propeller though a long driveshaft. Construction throughout is of composite materials. The enclosed cabin seats four people in 2+2 configuration.

Aerodis planned to use this design as the basis for a jet trainer aircraft, the AA300 Rigel, and a light tactical aircraft, the AA330 Theta. In both these cases, the piston engine was to be replaced by a small turbofan, either the Garrett F109 or Williams FJ44, and the cockpit was to be enclosed by a bubble canopy. The Rigel was to seat pilot and instructor in tandem, while the Theta was to be a single-seat aircraft fitted with an ejector seat. Aerodis presented both designs at the 1989 Paris Air Show.

Two prototypes of the Rigel were under construction in 1991 for entry into the US Department of Defense Joint Primary Aircraft Training System competition, one to test each of the prospective powerplants. Aerodis was unable to attract sufficient investment to complete the prototypes or continue development.

Manufacturing of Aerodis designs was to have been carried out by Cipta Restu Sarana Svaha (CRSS) in Indonesia. In 1991, Aerodis sold the whole program to CRSS.

== Specifications (AA200) ==
Data from Lambert 1991, p.337

General characteristics

- Crew: 1 pilot
- Capacity: 3 passengers
- Length: 25 ft 5 in (7.75 m)
- Wingspan: 30 ft 0 in (9.14 m)
- Height: 8 ft 7 in (2.62 m)
- Wing area: 137 sq ft (12.7 m^{2})
- Empty weight: 1,400 lb (635 kg)
- Max takeoff weight: 2,500 lb (1,134 kg)
- Powerplant: 1 × Lycoming O-360 4-cylinder, horizontally-opposed, air-cooled piston engine, 180 hp (130 kW)

Performance

- Maximum speed: 180 kn (210 mph, 330 km/h)
- Cruise speed: 165 kn (190 mph, 306 km/h)
- Range: 780 nmi (900 mi, 1,440 km)
- Service ceiling: 14,500 ft (4,400 m)
- Rate of climb: 1,020 ft/min (5.2 m/s) (max. at sea level)
- Wing loading: 18.25 lb/sq ft (89.1 kg/m^{2})
- Power/mass: 13.89
