= Creative Flight Aerocat =

Canadian homebuilt light aircraft

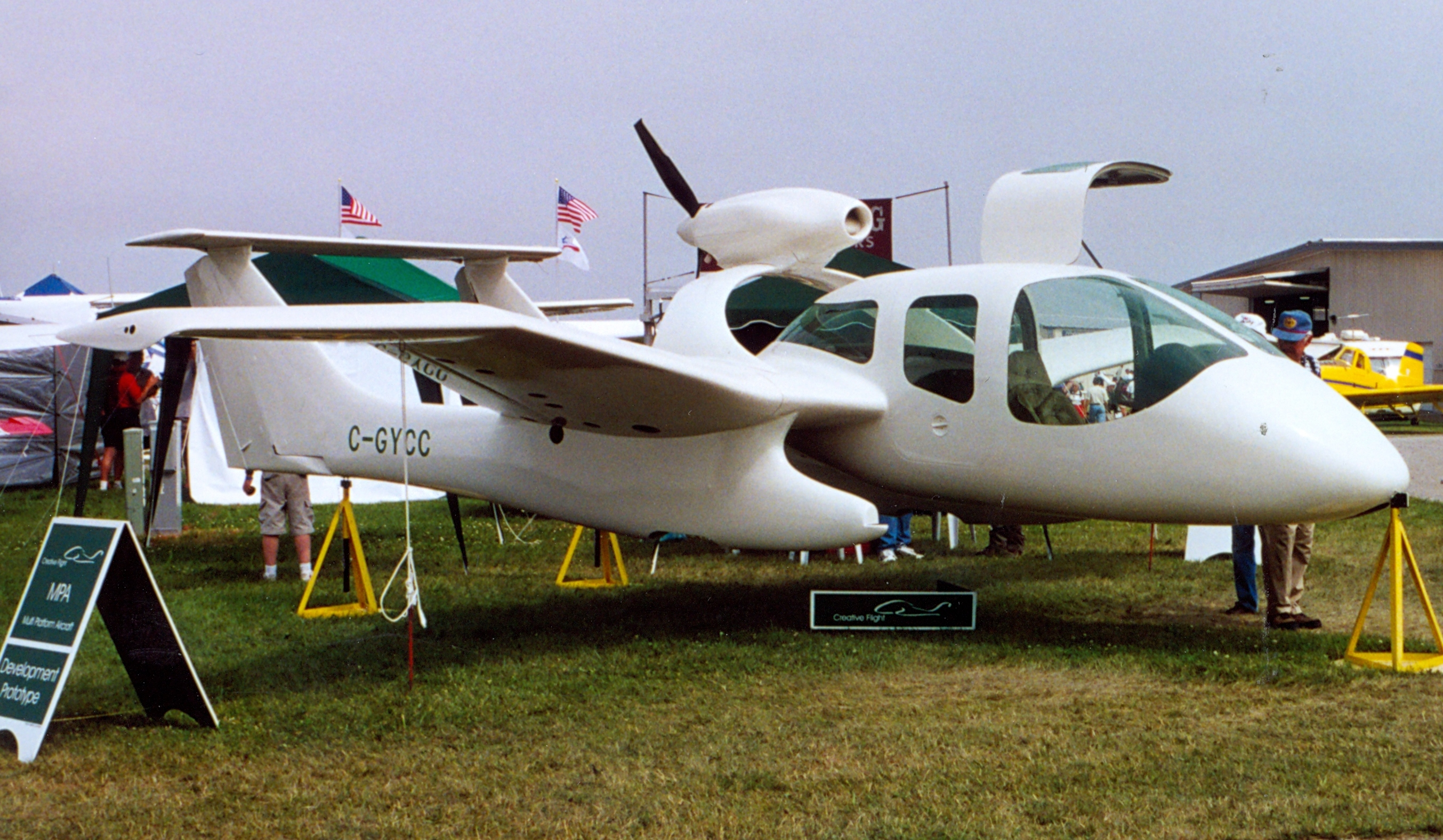
- Aerocat prototype

General information
- Type: Kit aircraft
- National origin: Canada
- Manufacturer: Creative Flight; Auriga Design
- Designer: Kirk Creelman
- Status: Under development
- Number built: One (2011)

History
- Introduction date: 2001
- First flight: 15 July 2001 (single engine); 5 September 2002 (twin)

The Creative Flight Aerocat is a Canadian mid-wing, all composite, four passenger experimental aircraft that can be configured for amphibious float operations. Under development since 1998, the aircraft is intended to be supplied in kit form by Creative Flight of Haliburton, Ontario, for amateur construction. The company has since been renamed Auriga Design.

== Design and development ==
Development started in 1998 on the MPA Aerocat. In 2002, the vehicle was renamed the Creative Flight Aerocat.

The all composite aircraft features a distinctive gull-wing design with pods that floats can attach to. A twin engine variant is powered by two Jabiru 3300 engines. In both the case of the single and twin engined versions, the engines are mounted in pusher configuration on a composite arch behind the cockpit.

== Operational history ==
The single engine prototype flew in 2001, then was retrofitted for twin engine operations and flown in 2002. Shortly afterward the aircraft was test flown with floats.

In 2003, the prototype was flown to the EAA AirVenture Oshkosh airshow and displayed.

As of August 2019 the prototype, C-GYCC, remained the sole example flying.

== Variants ==
SR
Single engine version with retractable gear, powered by a Crossflow CF4-20THO 250 hp (186 kW) engine.
SRX
Single engine version with retractable gear and floats, powered by a Crossflow CF4-20THO 250 hp (186 kW) engine or one Pratt & Whitney Canada PT6A-21 turboprop producing 480 hp (358 kW)
TR
Twin engine version with retractable gear, powered by two Jabiru 3300 120 hp (89 kW) engines
TRX
Twin engine version with retractable gear and floats, powered by two Jabiru 3300 120 hp (89 kW) engines

== Specifications (Aerocat SR) ==
Data from Creative Flight

General characteristics

- Crew: 1
- Capacity: 3 passengers
- Length: 8.23 m (27 ft 0 in) (overall length)
- Wingspan: 10.36 m (34 ft 0 in)
- Height: 2.72 m (8 ft 11 in)
- Wing area: 15.33 m^{2} (165.0 sq ft)
- Airfoil: NLF 0215 (mod)
- Empty weight: 794 kg (1,750 lb)
- Gross weight: 1,361 kg (3,000 lb)
- Fuel capacity: 68 gallons
- Powerplant: 1 × Crossflow CF4-20THO , 190 kW (250 hp)

Performance

- Cruise speed: 298 km/h (185 mph, 161 kn)
- Stall speed: 80 km/h (50 mph, 43 kn)
- Rate of climb: 6.1 m/s (1,200 ft/min)
