= Cobalt Co50 Valkyrie =

American homebuilt aircraft design

Co50 Valkyrie
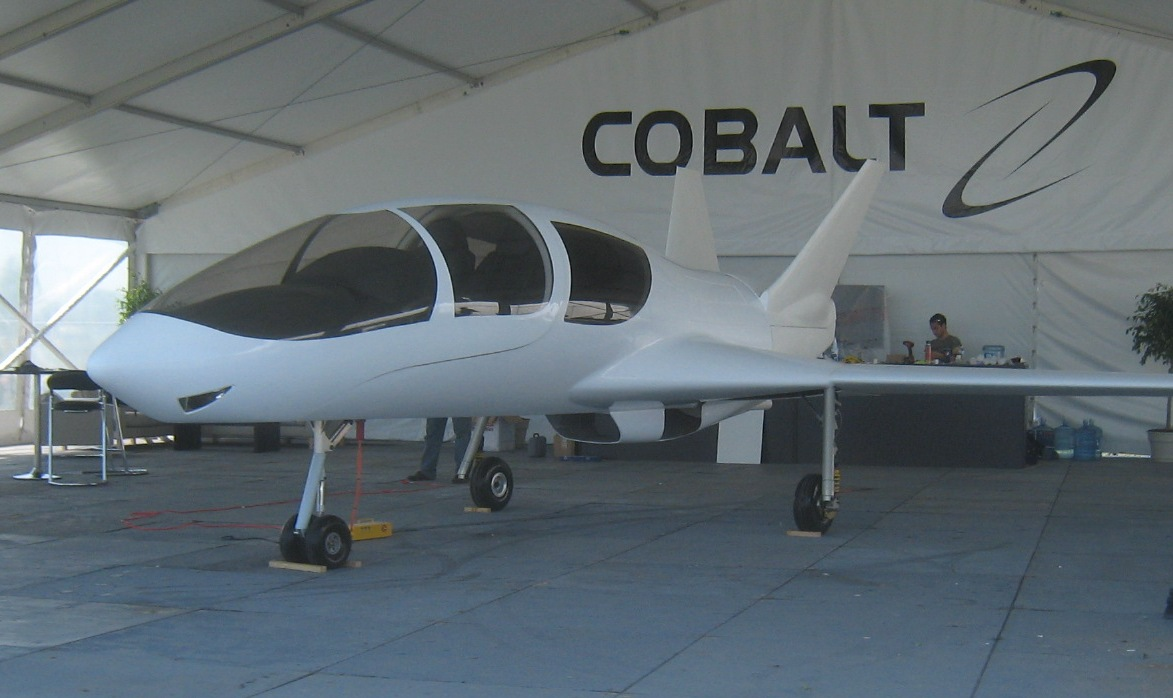
- Photo of the incomplete prototype

General information
- Type: Homebuilt aircraft
- National origin: United States
- Manufacturer: Cobalt Aircraft; Centauri Aircraft Company
- Status: Under development
- Number built: at least two

History
- First flight: January 2015

The Cobalt Co50 Valkyrie is a single-engine, four to five-seat homebuilt aircraft, arranged in a canard, pusher configuration. A light aircraft intended for private ownership, it was initially being developed by Cobalt Aircraft of San Francisco, California, United States, but the company ceased operations in July 2018 and the design is now being developed by the Centauri Aircraft Company.

== Design ==
The composite design incorporates retractable landing gear, a pusher engine configuration, a canard, twin vertical stabilizers and automatic airbrakes. A ballistic parachute is provided as an option. Passenger entry is by a large forward fold down door. Kit production is planned to be carried out in the United States.

Initially the Co50 will be sold as a kit for amateur construction, but the manufacturer intends to eventually achieve type certification. Certification is likely to be time-consuming, not least due to the electronics Cobalt has chosen being untested for aircraft use.

== Operational history ==
The company has declined to publish the number of aircraft on order or completed.

In August 2020 there were two Co50s registered in the United States with the Federal Aviation Administration. One was built in 2014 and owned by the then defunct previous manufacturer, Cobalt Aircraft, and flagged by the FAA as "this aircraft's registration status may not be suitable for operation". The second aircraft was built in 2018 and is registered to a private company. By February 2023, there was only one aircraft still registered with the FAA, owned by the Centauri Aircraft Corp.

== Accidents ==
The second prototype Co50 was crashed in September 2017 following a loss of aileron effectiveness in flight on a flight test at Castle Airport. The pilot was landing the aircraft using rudder and thrust only when lift was lost at an altitude of about ten feet. The aircraft impacted the ground, the right main landing gear leg separated and the wing was damaged. The pilot was not hurt.

== Specifications (Co50) ==
Data from Company news release estimates

General characteristics

- Crew: one
- Capacity: three or four passengers
- Length: 30 ft (9.1 m)
- Wingspan: 30 ft (9.1 m)
- Height: 10 ft (3.0 m)
- Max takeoff weight: 3,417 lb (1,550 kg)
- Fuel capacity: 109 U.S. gallons (410 L; 91 imp gal)
- Powerplant: 1 × Continental TSIOF-550-D turbocharged piston aircraft engine, 350 hp (260 kW)

Performance

- Cruise speed: 250 kn (290 mph, 460 km/h) maximum cruise at FL250
- Range: 1,434 nmi (1,650 mi, 2,656 km) economy cruise at FL220
- Service ceiling: 25,000 ft (7,600 m)
- Time to altitude: 12 minutes to 10,000 feet

Avionics

- Garmin G3X Touch
