= Curtiss XP-62 =

Prototype fighter aircraft

XP-62
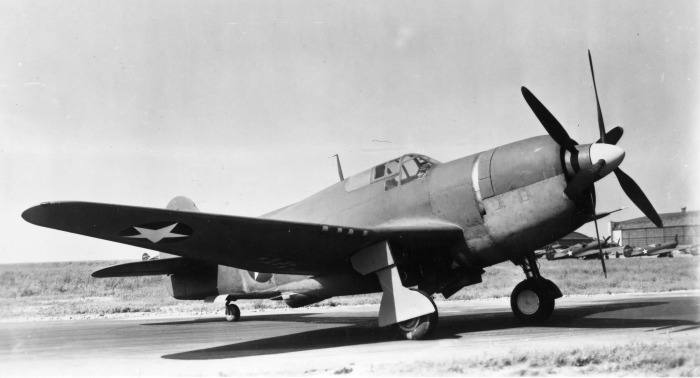
- A Curtiss XP-62 on the tarmac

General information
- Type: Fighter interceptor
- Manufacturer: Curtiss-Wright
- Status: Cancelled 21 September 1943
- Primary user: United States Army Air Forces
- Number built: 1

History
- Manufactured: 1943
- First flight: 21 July 1943

The Curtiss XP-62 was a prototype single-engine interceptor aircraft, that was built for the United States Army Air Forces, by the Curtiss-Wright Corporation. It first flew in 1943.

The design sought to have an improved high-altitude performance and higher speeds, at all altitudes, which was to be assisted by the 18-cylinder Wright R-3350 Duplex-Cyclone engine. It was to be armed with four 20 mm (0.79 in) autocannons, a heavier armament than contemporary USAAF fighter aircraft, and was fitted with a pressurized cockpit.

== Design and development ==
The terms of the contract proposal of 29 April 1941 called for the first flight within fifteen months of the award and meet the following objectives.

1. Maximum level flight speed at 27,000 ft (8,200 m) had to exceed 468 mph (753 km/h).
2. It was to feature an air-conditioned pressurized cockpit.
3. Armament to be either eight 20 mm (0.79 in) cannons or twelve 0.50 in (12.7 mm) machine guns, mounted in the wings.

Two prototypes were ordered; the first designated XP-62 and the second designated XP-62A.

On 2 August 1941, the specifications were amended for the XP-62, reducing the maximum speed to 448 mph (721 km/h) with eight 20 mm (0.79 in) cannons, and increasing the loaded weight by 1,537 lb (697 kg).

During a project review of 1 January 1942, the specification was again revised, with the loaded weight reduced by eliminating four cannons and removing the propeller de-icing equipment.

On 25 May 1942 a contract for 100 P-62 fighters was awarded. However, on 27 July 1942, before production could begin, the contract for the P-62 was terminated by the USAAF because of the effect on deliveries of Curtiss-built Republic P-47G-CU Thunderbolts.

While work on the XP-62A continued, it progressed slowly, owing to its low priority. Delays in delivery of the pressure-cabin supercharger and engine modifications delayed the first flight until 21 July 1943. Only a limited amount of flight testing was carried out before the XP-62A was canceled on 21 September 1943 and full performance characteristics were not obtained. The prototype was scrapped in early 1944.

== Variants ==
XP-62
Prototype, 8 x 20 mm cannons
P-62A
Planned initial production version, 100-aircraft contract cancelled

== Specifications (XP-62) ==
Data from Curtiss Aircraft 1907–1947

General characteristics

- Crew: 1
- Length: 39 ft 6 in (12.04 m)
- Wingspan: 53 ft 8 in (16.36 m)
- Height: 16 ft 3 in (4.95 m)
- Wing area: 420 sq ft (39 m^{2})
- Airfoil: root: NACA 66-118; tip: NACA 66-113
- Empty weight: 11,775 lb (5,341 kg)
- Gross weight: 16,650 lb (7,552 kg)
- Powerplant: 1 × Wright R-3350-17 Duplex Cyclone 18-cylinder air-cooled radial piston engine, 2,300 hp (1,700 kW)
- Propellers: 6-bladed contra-rotating constant-speed propeller

Performance

- Maximum speed: 448 mph (721 km/h, 389 kn) at 27,000 ft (8,200 m)
- Range: 1,300 mi (2,100 km, 1,100 nmi)
- Service ceiling: 37,500 ft (11,400 m)
- Time to altitude: 15,000 ft (4,600 m) in 6.9 minutes
- Wing loading: 35 lb/sq ft (170 kg/m^{2})
- Power/mass: 0.16 hp/lb (0.26 kW/kg)

Armament

- Guns: 8 x 20 mm (0.787 in) cannon or 12 x 12,7 mm machine guns

== See also ==
Related lists

- List of fighter aircraft
- List of military aircraft of the United States

== Bibliography ==
- Buttler, Tony (2024). American Experimental Fighters of WWII: The Pursuit of Excellence. Crécy Publishing. ISBN 978-1-80035-310-7.
- Green, William. War Planes of the Second World War – Fighters, Volume 4. London: Macdonald. 1961.
