= Czech Sport Aircraft Sky Cruiser =

Sky Cruiser
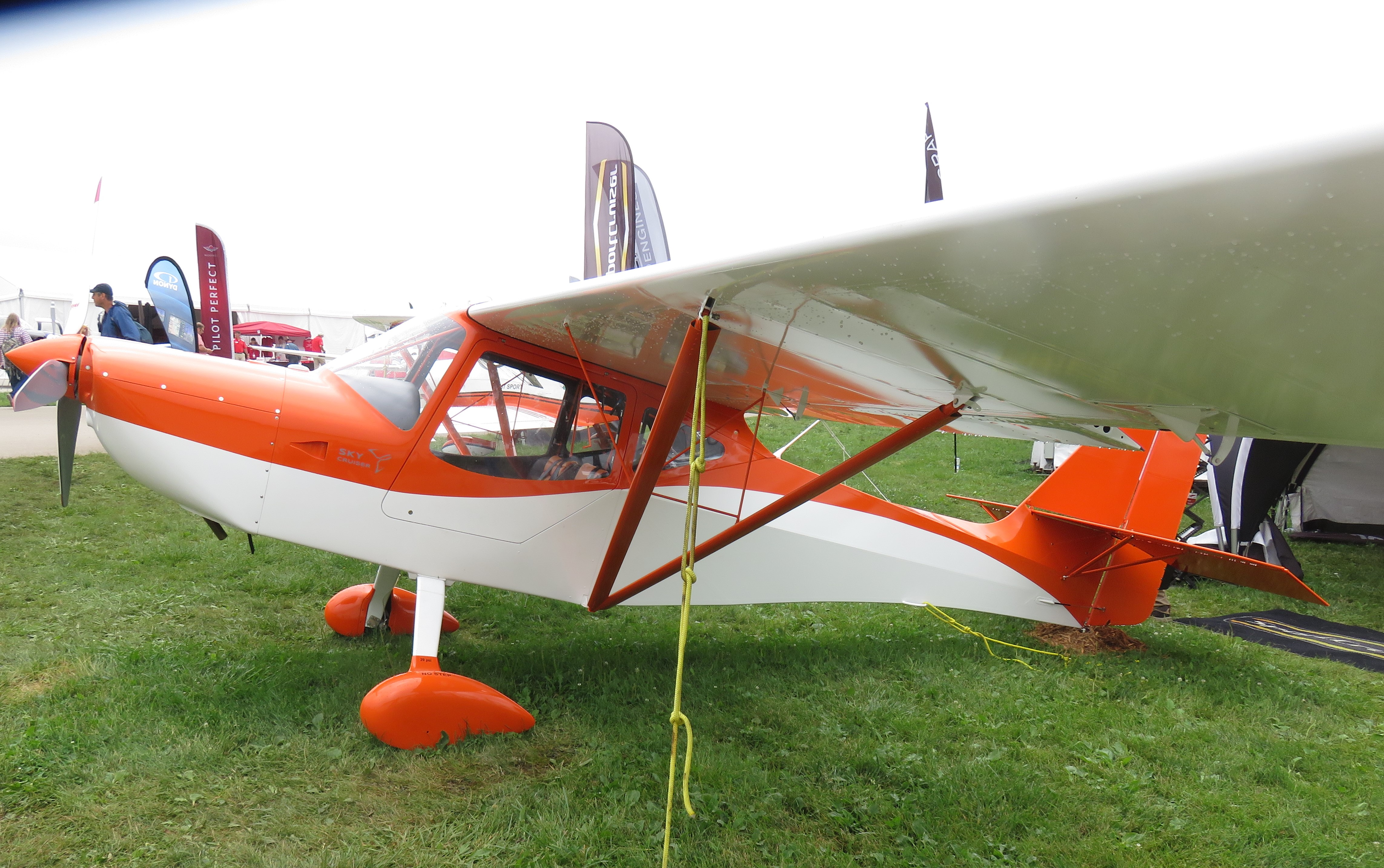
- Sky Cruiser on display

General information
- Type: Light sport
- Manufacturer: Czech Sport Aircraft
- Status: In development

History
- Introduction date: 2016

The Czech Sport Aircraft Sky Cruiser is a single engine high wing conventional landing gear aircraft in development by Czech Sport Aircraft.

== Specifications ==
General characteristics

- Crew: 1 pilot
- Capacity: 1 passenger
- Powerplant: 1 × Rotax 912 horizontally opposed piston
- Propellers: 3-bladed

Performance

== See also ==
- CZAW SportCruiser
