= Curtiss PN-1 =

PN-1
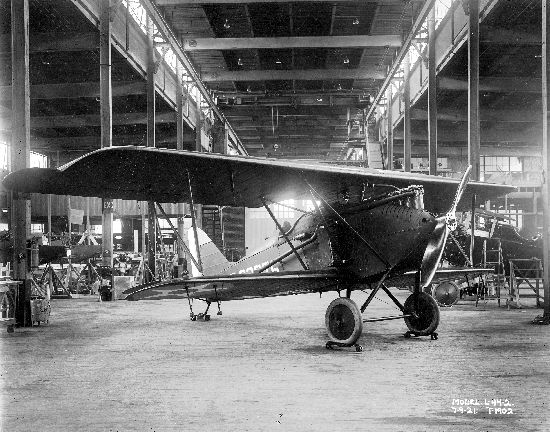

General information
- Type: Night fighter
- National origin: United States
- Manufacturer: Curtiss Aeroplane and Motor Company
- Status: Abandoned project
- Number built: 1

History
- First flight: 1921

The Curtiss PN-1 was an American single-seat night fighter biplane built by Curtiss Aeroplane and Motor Company using blueprints from the Engineering Division of the United States Army Air Service.

== Development ==
Designed by the USAAC, the PN-1 was a welded steel tube fuselage covered by fabric. The wings were wood covered by fabric. One of the two prototypes ordered was built, and underwent static testing at McCook Field. It may have undergone flight testing, but no orders were received.

== Specifications ==
Data from

General characteristics

- Crew: 1
- Length: 23 ft 6 in (7.16 m)
- Wingspan: 30 ft 10 in (9.39 m)
- Height: 10 ft 3 in (3.12 m)
- Wing area: 300 sq ft (27.87 m^{2})
- Empty weight: 1,631 lb (740 kg)
- Gross weight: 2,311 lb (1,048 kg)
- Powerplant: 1 × Liberty L-825 , 230 hp (172 kW)

Performance

- Maximum speed: 108 mph (174 km/h, 94 kn)
- Range: 255 mi (410 km, 222 nmi)
- Service ceiling: 25,600 ft (7,803 m)
- Rate of climb: 1,182 ft/min (6.0 m/s)

Armament

- 2 × .30 in (7.62 mm) M1919 Browning machine guns
