= Curtiss-Wright CA-1 =

American biplane amphibian designed by Frank Courtney

CA-1
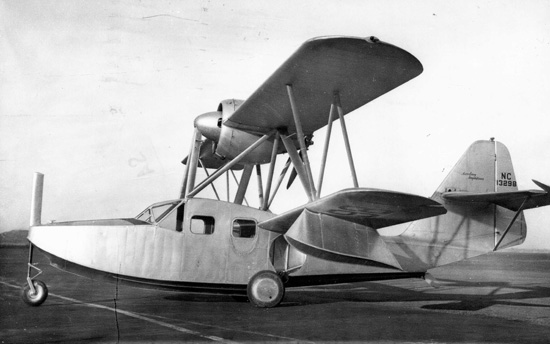

General information
- Type: Biplane amphibian
- National origin: United States
- Manufacturer: Curtiss-Wright
- Designer: Frank Courtney
- Number built: 3

History
- First flight: 1935

The Curtiss CA-1 (sometimes known as the Commuter or the Courtney Amphibian) was an American five-seat biplane amphibian designed by Frank Courtney and built by Curtiss-Wright at St Louis, Missouri.

== Design and development ==
Designed by the British test pilot Frank Courtney, the CA-1 was a five-seat amphibian. The CA-1 was powered by a 365 hp (272 kW) Wright 975E-1 radial, cowled and fitted into the leading edge of the top wing driving - through an extension shaft - a pusher propeller. It had a tricycle amphibian landing gear and an enclosed cabin for the pilot and passengers. Only three aircraft were built, and they were all sold in Japan, designated Curtiss-Wright LXC (Navy Experimental Type C Amphibious Transport) by the Imperial Japanese Navy Air Service.

== Specifications ==
Data from Curtiss Aircraft 1907–1947

General characteristics

- Crew: one
- Capacity: four passengers
  240 lb (110 kg) baggage
- Length: 31 ft 0 in (9.45 m)
- Wingspan: 40 ft 0 in (12.19 m)
- Height: 12 ft (3.7 m)
- Airfoil: NACA 2412
- Empty weight: 2,980 lb (1,352 kg)
- Gross weight: 4,650 lb (2,109 kg)
- Powerplant: 1 × Wright R-975E-1 Whirlwind 9-cylinder air-cooled radial piston engine, 365 hp (272 kW)
- Propellers: 2-bladed fixed-pitch pusher propeller

Performance

- Maximum speed: 151 mph (243 km/h, 131 kn)
- Cruise speed: 125 mph (201 km/h, 109 kn)
- Stall speed: 60 mph (97 km/h, 52 kn)
- Range: 550 mi (890 km, 480 nmi)
- Service ceiling: 14,000 ft (4,300 m)
- Rate of climb: 835 ft/min (4.24 m/s)

== See also ==
Related lists

- List of flying boats and floatplanes
