= Ekolot Elf =

Ekolot Elf may refer to:

- Ekolot JK 01A Elf
- Ekolot KR-010 Elf
