= CZAW Parrot =

Czech light-sport aircraft

Parrot
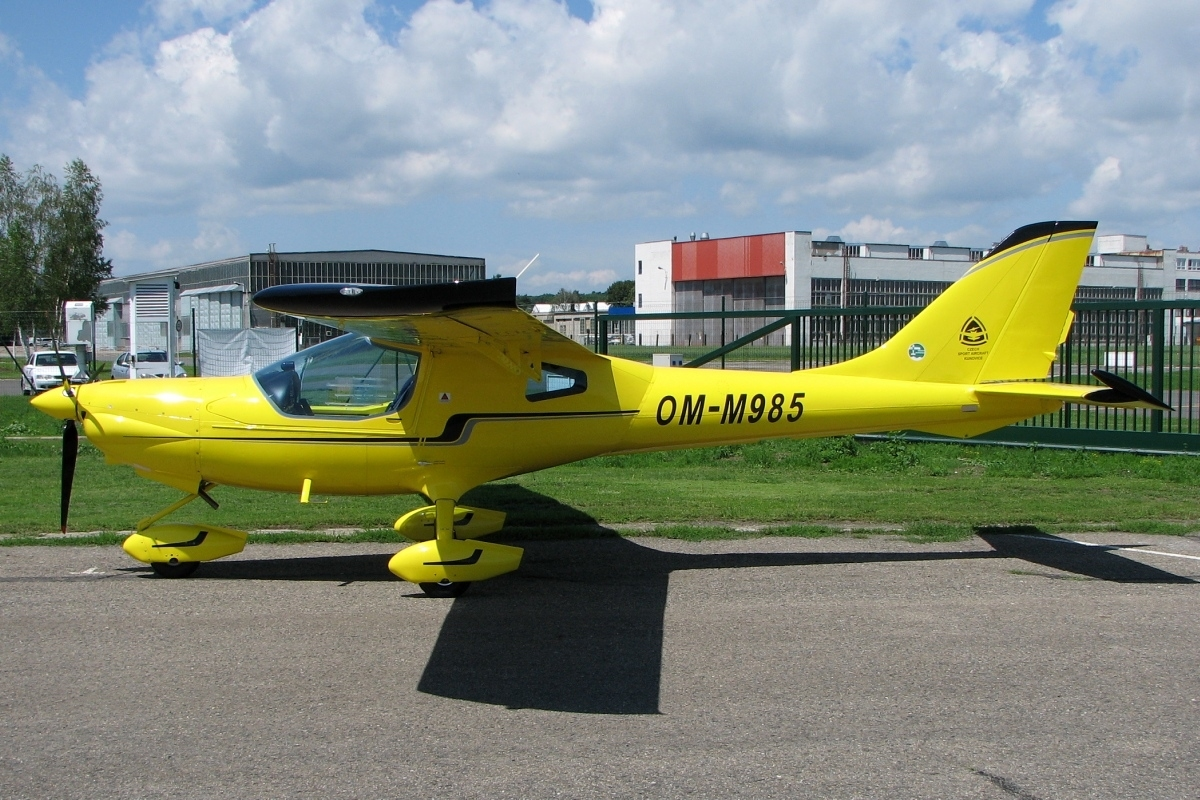
- PS-10 Tourer

General information
- Type: Light-sport aircraft
- National origin: Czech Republic
- Manufacturer: Czech Sport Aircraft
- Status: Production completed May 2008 (Parrot); Under development (PS-10 Tourer)
- Number built: 3 (Parrot)

History
- Introduction date: 2005
- First flight: 15 June 2005 (Parrot)

The CZAW Parrot, also called the CSA Parrot, is a Czech light-sport aircraft that was designed and produced by Czech Aircraft Works, now Czech Sport Aircraft of Prague. The aircraft first flew on 15 June 2005 and, while it was available, it was supplied as a complete ready-to-fly-aircraft.

The Parrot was discontinued in May 2008, after three were completed and the design developed into the PS-10 Tourer.

== Design and development ==
The Parrot was designed to comply with the US light-sport aircraft rules. It features a cantilever high-wing, a two-seats-in-side-by-side configuration enclosed cockpit, fixed tricycle landing gear with wheel pants and a single engine in tractor configuration.

The Parrot is made from aluminum sheet. Its forward-swept 11.4 m (37.4 ft) span wing has an area of 9.5 m^{2} (102 sq ft). The forward sweep allows the cabin to be forward of the wing, providing pilot visibility in turns. Standard engines available were the 100 hp (75 kW) Rotax 912ULS and the 120 hp (89 kW) Jabiru 3300 four-stroke powerplants.

The Parrot was first flown on 15 June 2005 and the prototype was immediately shipped to the United States to be displayed at AirVenture 2005. The design was added to the Federal Aviation Administration's list of approved special light-sport aircraft in January 2006. By May 2008 three Parrots had been completed and the aircraft was discontinued.

The design was included in the intellectual property transferred from CZAW to CSA in 2009 and then redesigned with components from the PS-28 Cruiser and designated as the PS-10 Tourer. The PS-10 Tourer first flew on 6 December 2010 and was first publicly shown at the Aero show in Friedrichshafen in 2011. By December 2012 the PS-10 was not yet advertised for sale by CSA.

== Variants ==
Parrot
Base model with gross weight of 600 kg (1,323 lb). First flown 15 June 2005, discontinued May 2008 after three built.
PS-10 Tourer
Developmental evolution of the Parrot to include common engine cowling, nose gear and rudder assemblies with the PS-28 Cruiser, plus the addition of rear windows, larger elevator trim tab, removal of rudder horn and the empty weight was reduced. First flown 6 December 2010.

== Specifications (Parrot) ==
Data from Bayerl

General characteristics

- Crew: one
- Capacity: one passenger
- Wingspan: 11.4 m (37 ft 5 in)
- Wing area: 9.5 m^{2} (102 sq ft)
- Empty weight: 360 kg (794 lb)
- Gross weight: 600 kg (1,323 lb)
- Fuel capacity: 100 litres (22 imp gal; 26 US gal)
- Powerplant: 1 × Rotax 912ULS four cylinder, liquid and air-cooled, four stroke aircraft engine, 75 kW (101 hp)

Performance

- Cruise speed: 206 km/h (128 mph, 111 kn)
- Stall speed: 56 km/h (35 mph, 30 kn)
- Rate of climb: 10 m/s (2,000 ft/min)
