= Timur Fatkullin =

Ukrainian aircraft pilot

- Фаткуллін Тимур Анварович
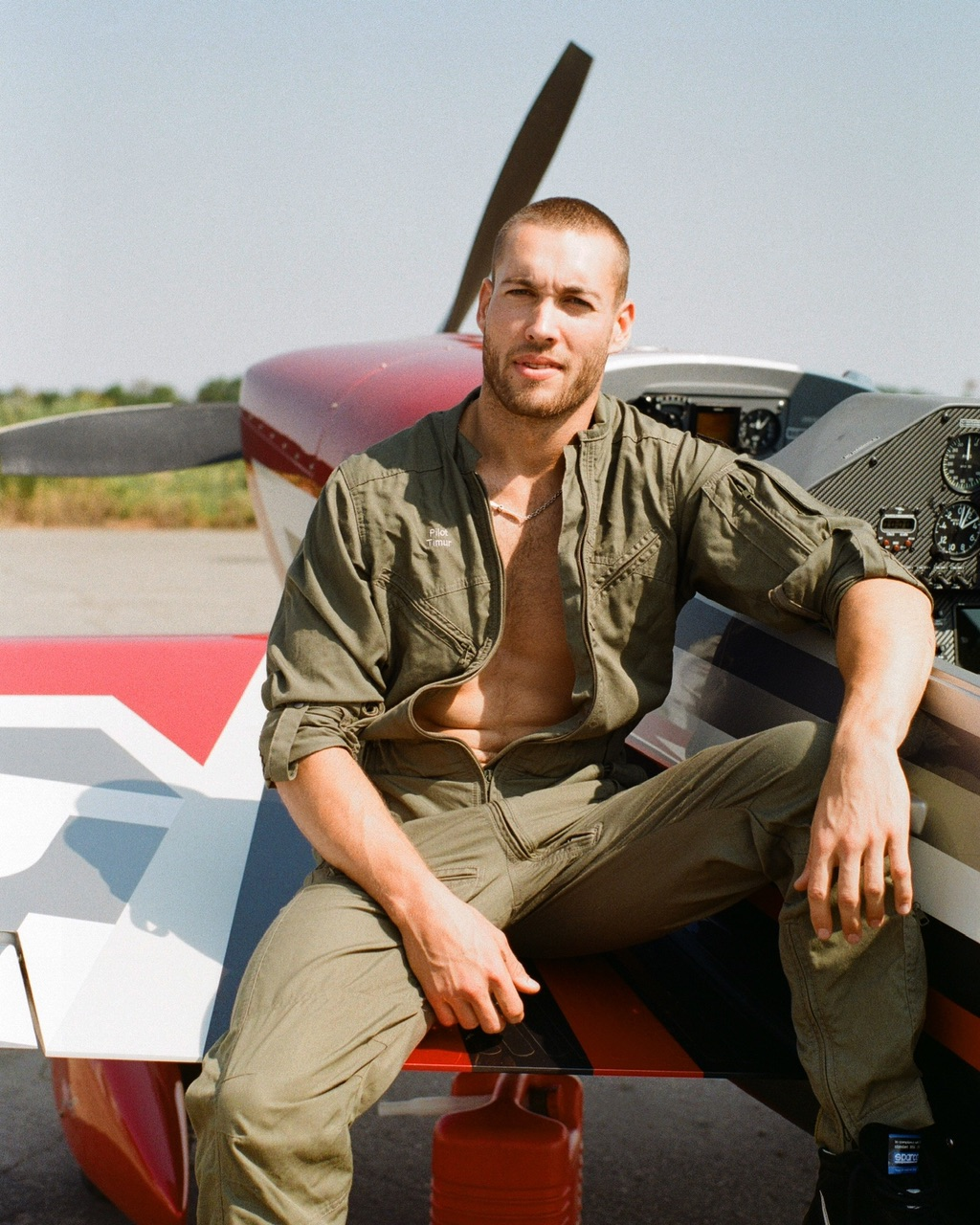
- Born: October 20, 1993 (age 32)
- Occupation: Pilot

Timur Fatkullin (born October 20, 1993)— aircraft pilot, aerobatic athlete, International Class Master of Sports in aeronautics, founder of the Aerotim team. World champion in aerobatics as a member of the Ukrainian national team, gold medalist. Winner of the GoPro Million Dollar Challenge.

== Biography ==
Born on October 20, 1993, in the village of Chornomorske, Crimea. From the age of 6, he was involved in a climbing section. In high school, he formed a rock band with his classmates and played electric guitar. At the age of 16, he entered the Sevastopol National Technical University, Faculty of Economics and Management. He trained in the rock climbing team.

In 2008, he became a finalist for the Stockholm Junior Water Prize with his invention for desalination and was awarded by Victoria, Crown Princess of Sweden.

In 2012, he visited the Yukharina Balka airfield to learn to fly. At that time, the DOSAAF explained that "airplanes don't fly without money" and sent him to the parachute unit, where he made his first jump.

At the Ukrainian Pilot School, he received his private pilot's license on K-10 Swift. After obtaining his license, he met aerobatics coach Igor Chernov, who taught Timur simple and complex aerobatics on an RV-7.

In 2018, he took aerobatics training on an Extra 330lx in Aachen, received a German pilot's license at the Extrabatics school to fly solo on rental aircraft in Europe. In August of the same year, he performed at the Korolyov air show in Zhytomyr.

In July 2019, he performed with the team at the World Aerobatics Championships in the Intermediate category in the Czech city of Břeclav. Timur became a gold medalist, and the team (Igor Chernov, Timur Fatkullin, Dmitry Pogrebitsky) became the absolute world champions in 2019. For a team of 3, the Ukrainians won 5 gold medals and the first team place, beating all other teams. In the same year, he starred as a model for Porsche and gave interviews for L'Officiel, Vogue, and Aught.

In October 2020, the team raised a balloon with Oleksandr Marushko standing on its dome at an altitude of one and a half kilometers and drinking coffee, while Timur flew by on an airplane, performing an extreme turn. The video has got into the GoPro Awards and later won the GoPro Million Dollar Challenge among 56 thousand videos from around the world.

On December 19, 2020, the team performed a highly coordinated stunt: Timur, flying an Extra airplane in an inverted position, passes between the departure and the landing ramp at an altitude of half a meter, while in the air above him, Sergiy Gusak performs a motorcycle jump and the Cordova trick.

In 2021, Nazar Dorosh and Timur Fatkullin's video was featured in the GoPro Awards.
