= CSA PS-38 Tourer =

Czech light-sport aircraft

PS-38 Tourer

General information
- Type: Light-sport aircraft
- National origin: Czech Republic
- Manufacturer: Czech Sport Aircraft
- Status: Under development (2015)

History
- Introduction date: 2014

The CSA PS-38 Tourer is a Czech light-sport aircraft under development by Czech Sport Aircraft of Prague, introduced at the AERO Friedrichshafen show in 2014. The aircraft is intended to be supplied complete and ready-to-fly.

== Design and development ==
The PS-38 Tourer was designed for private use for cross-country flying as well as the law enforcement role.

The aircraft was designed to comply with the US light-sport aircraft rules. It features a cantilever high-wing, an enclosed cabin with two-seats-in-side-by-side configuration accessed by doors, fixed tricycle landing gear and a single engine in tractor configuration.

The aircraft is made with an aluminum semi-monocoque structure. Its 8.6 m (28.2 ft) span forward-swept wing has an area of 12.3 m^{2} (132 sq ft) and mounts flaps. The standard engine used is the 100 hp (75 kW) Rotax 912ULS four-stroke powerplant. The forward-swept wing provides improved visibility to the pilot in turns.

As of January 2018, the design does not appear on the Federal Aviation Administration's list of approved special light-sport aircraft.

The design also did not appear on the manufacturer's website as offered for sale in February 2017.

== Specifications (PS-38 Tourer) ==
Data from Tacke

General characteristics

- Crew: one
- Capacity: one passenger
- Wingspan: 8.6 m (28 ft 3 in)
- Wing area: 12.3 m^{2} (132 sq ft)
- Empty weight: 381 kg (840 lb)
- Gross weight: 600 kg (1,323 lb)
- Fuel capacity: 114 litres (25 imp gal; 30 US gal) in two tanks
- Powerplant: 1 × Rotax 912ULS four cylinder, liquid and air-cooled, four stroke aircraft engine, 75 kW (101 hp)
- Propellers: 3-bladed composite

Performance

- Maximum speed: 220 km/h (140 mph, 120 kn)
- Cruise speed: 172 km/h (107 mph, 93 kn)
- Stall speed: 55 km/h (34 mph, 30 kn)
- Wing loading: 48.8 kg/m^{2} (10.0 lb/sq ft)
