= Ekolot KR-030 Topaz =

Polish ultralight aircraft

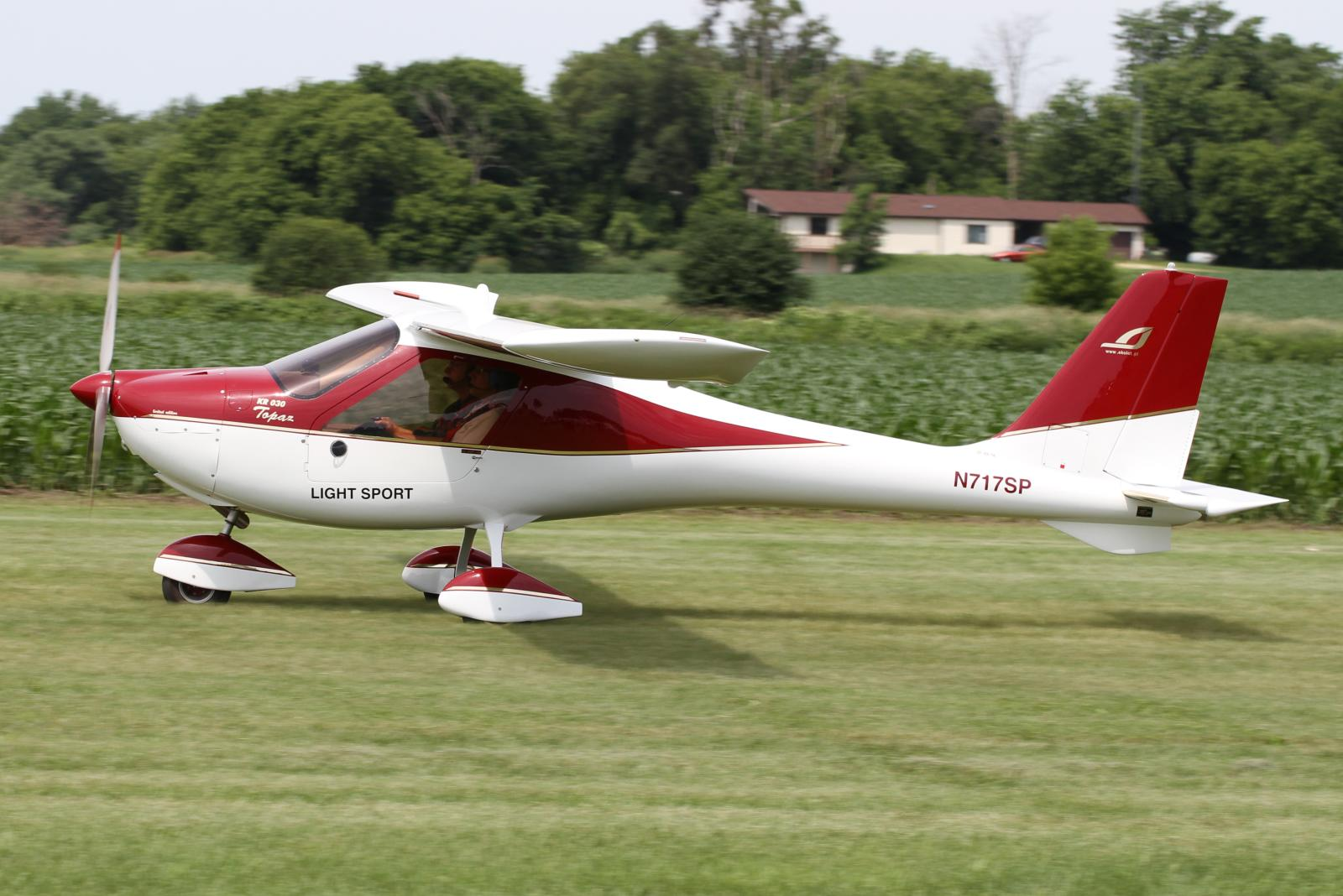

General information
- Type: Ultralight aircraft, light-sport aircraft
- National origin: Poland
- Manufacturer: Ekolot
- Status: In production (2025)

History
- Developed from: Ekolot JK-05L Junior

The Ekolot KR-030 Topaz is a Polish ultralight aircraft, designed and produced by Ekolot of Krosno. It was certified in Poland in February 2010. The aircraft is supplied as a kit for amateur construction or as a complete ready-to-fly aircraft.

== Design and development ==
The Topaz is a development of the Ekolot JK-05L Junior and was designed to comply with the Fédération Aéronautique Internationale microlight rules. It features a cantilever high wing in place of the Junior's strut-braced wing, a two-seats-in-side-by-side configuration enclosed cockpit, fixed tricycle landing gear and a single engine in tractor configuration.

Like the Junior, the Topaz is made from composites. Its 10.76 m (35.3 ft) span wing employs an NN-1817 airfoil, has an area of 10.24 m^{2} (110.2 sq ft) and flaps. Dual 35 litres (7.7 imp gal; 9.2 US gal) fuel tanks are located behind the seats. A ballistic parachute is an available option. The standard engine available is the 80 hp (60 kW) Rotax 912UL four-stroke powerplant.

The use of a one-piece wing without struts gives the Topaz a 20 km/h (12.4 mph) higher cruise speed than the Junior, while resulting in the same empty weight.

The Topaz has been accepted by the US Federal Aviation Administration as a light-sport aircraft.

== Specifications (KR-030 Topaz) ==
Data from Bayerl

General characteristics

- Crew: one
- Capacity: one passenger
- Wingspan: 10.76 m (35 ft 4 in)
- Wing area: 10.24 m^{2} (110.2 sq ft)
- Airfoil: NN-1817
- Empty weight: 290 kg (639 lb)
- Gross weight: 472.5 kg (1,042 lb)
- Fuel capacity: 70 litres (15 imp gal; 18 US gal)
- Powerplant: 1 × Rotax 912UL four cylinder, liquid and air-cooled, four stroke aircraft engine, 60 kW (80 hp)
- Propellers: 3-bladed composite

Performance

- Maximum speed: 220 km/h (140 mph, 120 kn)
- Cruise speed: 180 km/h (110 mph, 97 kn)
- Stall speed: 65 km/h (40 mph, 35 kn)
- Rate of climb: 6 m/s (1,200 ft/min)
