= Skyeton K-10 Swift =

K-10 Swift
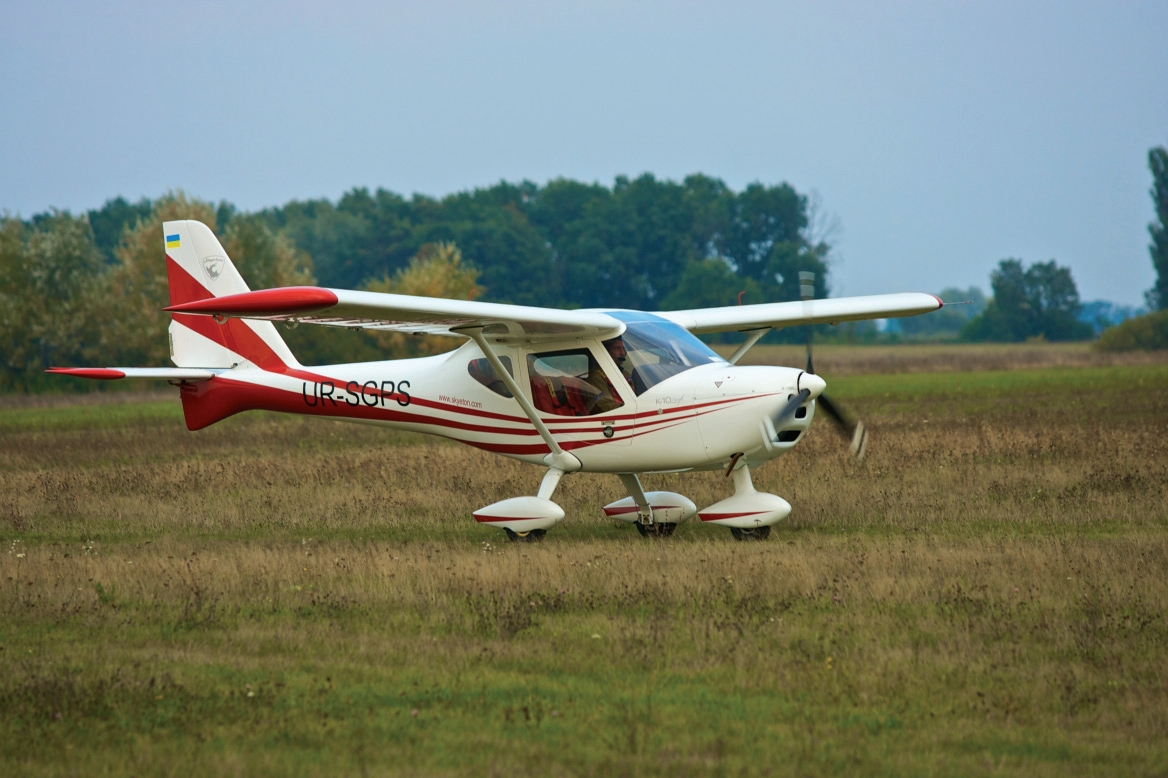

General information
- Type: Light Sport Aircraft or Ultralight
- National origin: Ukraine
- Manufacturer: Skyeton, Kyiv
- Designer: Igor Gapanovich
- Number built: at least 16

History
- First flight: October 2006

The Skyeton K-10 Swift is a two-seat, single-engine light sports or ultralight aircraft designed in Ukraine.

== Design and development ==
The Skyeton Swift is a conventionally laid out single-engine, high-wing light aircraft with side-by-side seating for two. The wings have constant chord, each braced with a single lift strut to the lower fuselage longeron. They use a single metal spar and have stressed skin metal upper surfaces and leading edges, combined with fabric covered lower surfaces aft of the spar. Fabric covered ailerons and inboard slotted flaps together occupy the whole of the wing trailing edges. The wings carry 2.17° dihedral.

The Swift's fuselage is built around four welded steel longerons and skinned with composite materials. Behind the cabin the fuselage diameter decreases markedly to the tail. The fin leading edge and the rudder hinge are both strongly swept but the trailing edge of the rudder, which carries an electrically operated trim tab, is only slightly swept. The tailplane and single piece elevator, also tabbed, are set well back, with the tailplane leading edge behind the rudder hinge. A small triangular underfin provides more vertical stabilizer area. A fixed tricycle undercarriage is mounted on the lower fuselage with cantilever legs. The wheels are spatted and the nosewheel steerable.

The Swift can be fitted with one of two Rotax 912 flat-four engines: the 59 kW (79 hp) 912UL or the 74 kW (99 hp) 912ULS. Both engines drive three-bladed propellers.

The Swift first flew in October 2006 and was developed into two versions. The first, designated K-10(02) Swift or ULM (ultra leger motorise), is aimed at the French ultralight market and gained French approval in 2009. The second version is targeted at the North American market and designated K-10(01) or LSA (for the US Light Sport Aircraft category). This has a wingspan increase of 600 mm, greater fuel capacity and a higher maximum take-off weight.

As of May 2019, the Swift is no longer mentioned on the manufacturer's website, indicating production was terminated.

== Operational history ==
Eight Swifts are on the Ukrainian civil register, one on the Russian and six more on the French register. One Swift has been manufactured in the US by SkyetonAmerica of Bettendorf, Iowa.

On 28 July 2024, Yuri Igorovich Kapustenskiy, a cadet of the Ukrainian Air Force undergoing pilot training with the Ivan Kozhedub National University of the Air Force fatally crashed while undergoing a solo training flight on a K-10 Swift stationed at Tsuniv airfield, near Zavereshytsia.

== Military operators ==
Ukraine

- Civil Air Patrol (Ukraine)
- Ukrainian Air Force

== Specifications (K-10(01)) ==
Data from Jane's All the World's Aircraft 2010/11

General characteristics

- Capacity: 2
- Length: 6.235 m (20 ft 5 in)
- Wingspan: 9.10 m (29 ft 10 in)
- Height: 2.67 m (8 ft 9 in)
- Airfoil: NACA 23015 (modified)
- Empty weight: 285 kg (628 lb) without rescue parachute
- Max takeoff weight: 575 kg (1,268 lb)
- Powerplant: 1 × Rotax 912 ULS 4-cylinder horizontally opposed, 73.5 kW (98.6 hp)
- Propellers: 3-bladed, 1.70 m (5 ft 7 in) diameter

Performance

- Maximum speed: 225 km/h (140 mph, 121 kn)
- Cruise speed: 205 km/h (127 mph, 111 kn)
- Stall speed: 58 km/h (36 mph, 31 kn) flaps down, power off
- Range: 900 km (560 mi, 490 nmi)
- g limits: +6.75/-3.3
- Rate of climb: 6.0 m/s (1,180 ft/min) at sea level
