= Fantasy Air =

Czech aircraft manufacturer

- Company type: Private company
- Industry: Aerospace
- Defunct: 2009
- Fate: bankrupt
- Headquarters: Pisek Airport, Czech Republic
- Products: Ultralight aircraft

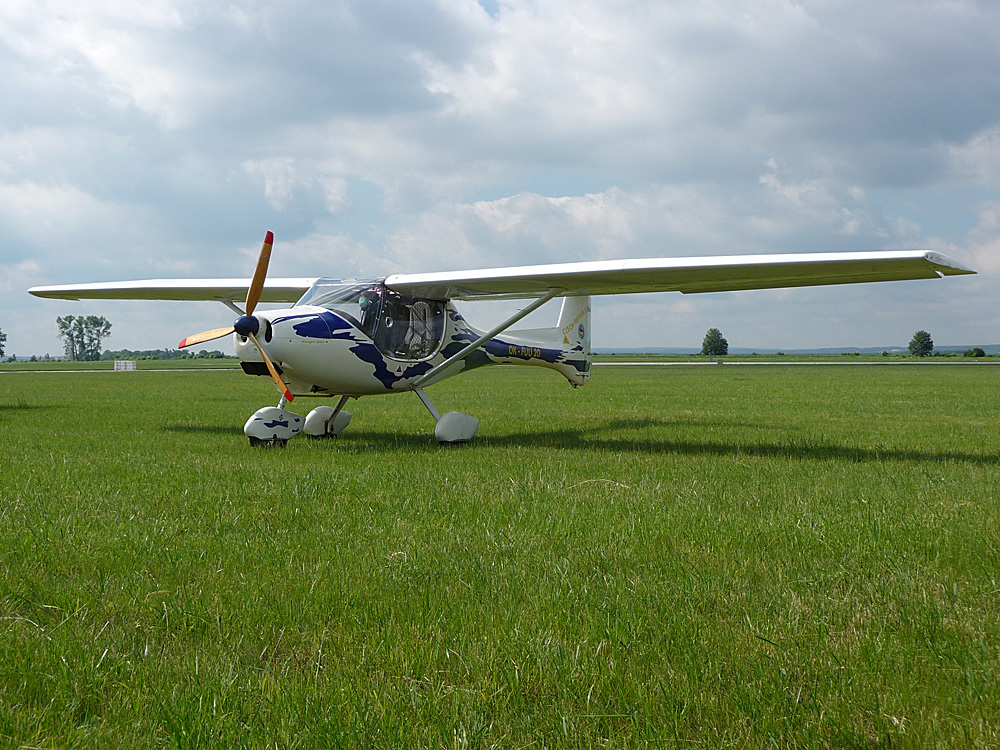
Fantasy Air Allegro 2000

Fantasy Air (Fantasy Air, s.r.o.) was a Czech aircraft manufacturer. The company started building ultralight aircraft in the 1990s. Fantasy Air manufactured the Allegro 2007 aircraft under microlight/ultralight regulations in several countries and under the Light-sport aircraft (LSA) rules in the US.

The company made a deal to purchase Pisek Airport in 2007, which took needed cash out of the manufacturing operation. The company was declared bankrupt on 9 November 2007, but managed to sell the airport and make a recovery.

In July 2009 the manufacturing of the Allegro was moved to Roseburg, Oregon, USA, as part of X-Air Australia. The move was attributed to the high value of the Euro reducing sales to the USA and Australia.
