= Fantasy Air Allegro =

Czech ultralight aircraft

Allegro
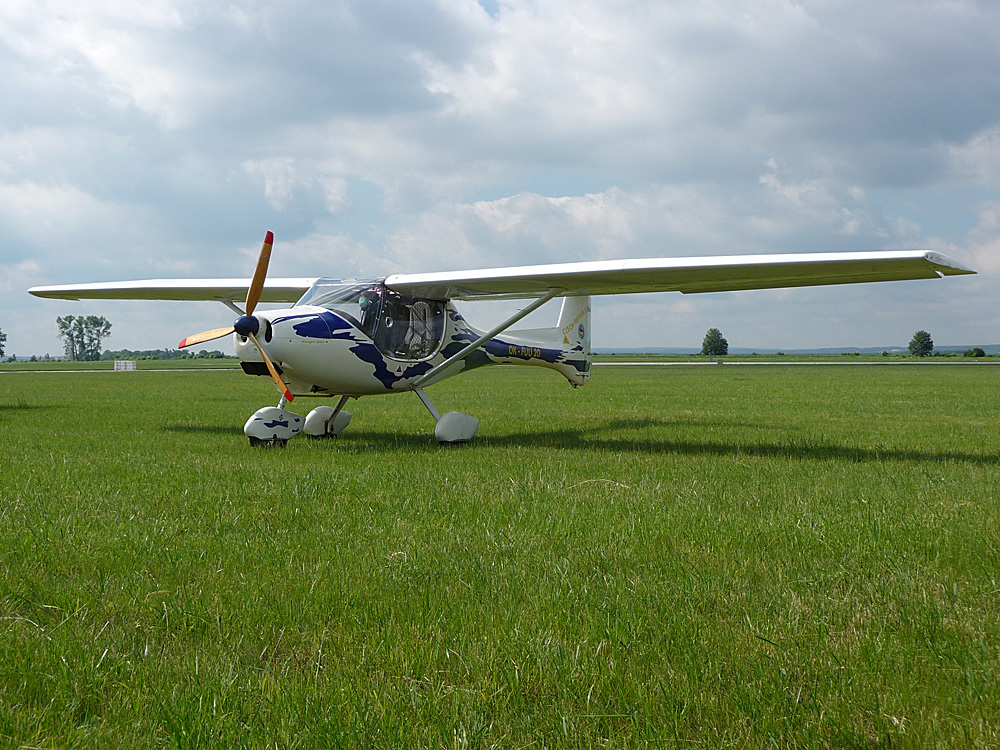
- Allegro 2000

General information
- Type: Microlight/Ultralight
- National origin: Czech Republic
- Manufacturer: Fantasy Air; Allegro LSA
- Designer: Oldrich Olsansky
- Number built: 300+

History
- First flight: 1995

The Fantasy Air Allegro is a Czech two seat, high wing, tricycle gear, single engine monoplane light-sport aircraft or microlight originally designed and built by Fantasy Air and later produced in the United States by Allegro LSA.

== Development ==
The Allegro has a strut-braced wing constructed from aluminum, with fibreglass wingtips. The 2000 and 2007 variants have a 10:1 aspect ratio wing that tapers outboard of the flaps, while the shorter-winged SW model has non-tapered wings. The wings are equipped with three-position electrically actuated flaps with positions for 0, 15 and 48 degrees for cruising flight, take-off and landing, respectively, on the 2000 model and −4.5, 15 and 48 degrees on the 2007 model. The ailerons are of a differential design. The airfoil is an SM 701.

The fuselage is constructed from Kevlar-reinforced fibreglass with steel tube reinforcement in the cockpit area. The seating is for pilot and passenger in side-by-side configuration, sharing a centre-mounted control stick. The landing gear is of tricycle configuration, with curved main gear legs made from fibreglass and a nosewheel mounted on steel tubes with rubber puck shock absorbing. There is also a shock-absorbing tail skid mounted under the fin. While the fin is fibreglass the horizontal stabilizer, elevator and adjustable trim tab mounted as a T-tail are all aluminum.

The standard 55 L (15 US gal) fuel tank is mounted under the floor, with wings tanks optional, bringing total capacity to 95 L (25 US gal).

Engines available for the 2000 include the 100 hp (75 kW) Rotax 912ULS, 80 hp (60 kW) Rotax 912UL and the 64 hp (48 kW) Rotax 582. The 2007 model offers only the Rotax 912UL and ULS. A glider-towing kit is optional which allows towing gliders up to 500 kg (1,102 lb) gross weight.

The design of the Allegro 2000 model has been praised for its aesthetic appeal, good cockpit visibility, light controls, operating economics and value, wide speed range, range and payload as well as enjoyable flight characteristics. It has been criticized for its poor ergonomic accommodation for taller pilots and also for poor control harmony, with the elevator controls much lighter than the ailerons, which are in turn much lighter than the rudder pedals.

The aircraft can be flown under the microlight/ultralight regulations of several countries as well as the USA FAA Light-sport Aircraft rules. In Canada the aircraft can be registered as a Basic Ultralight or Advanced Ultralight.

== Variants ==
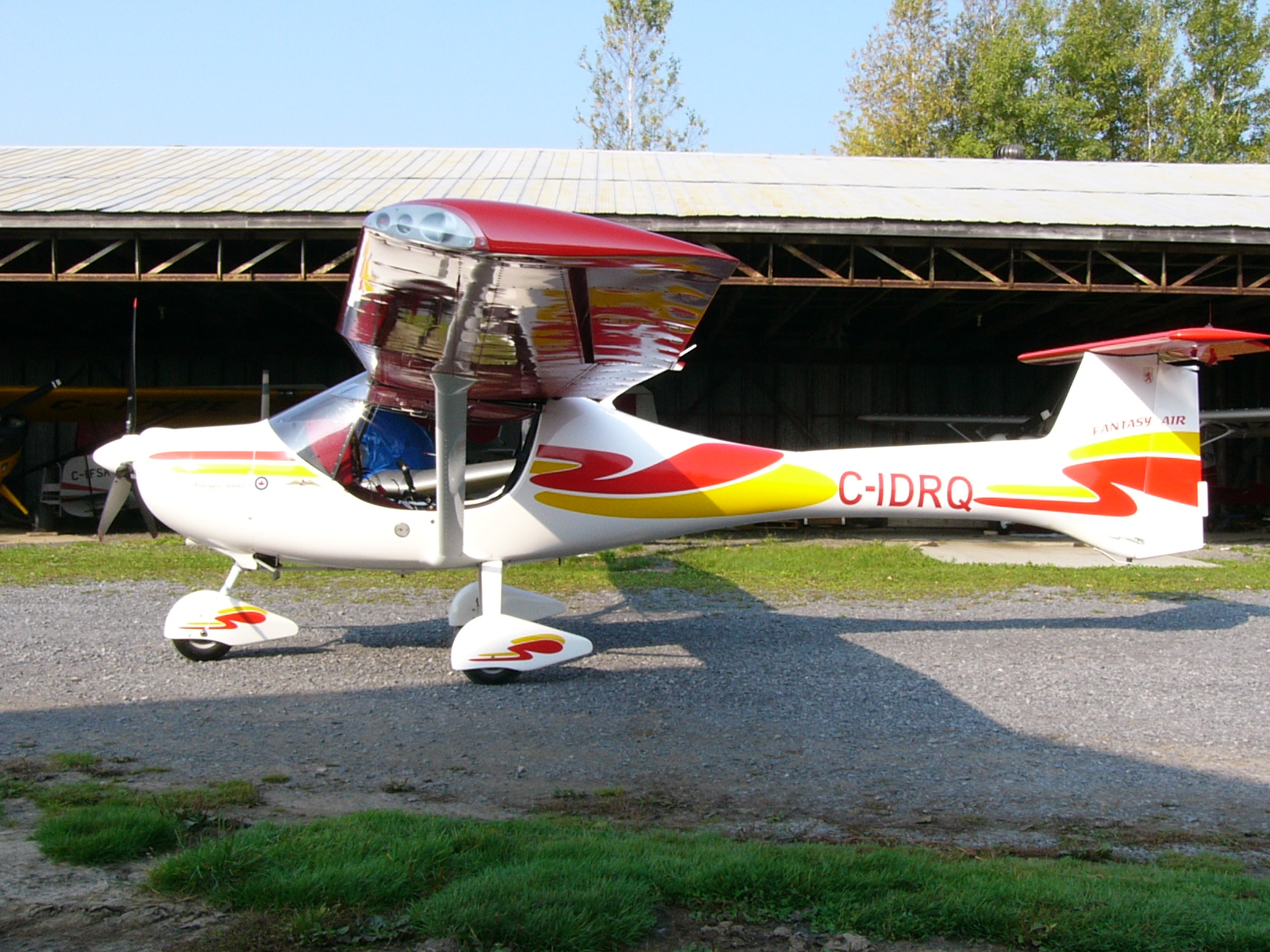
Allegro 2000

Cora
Original variant first flown in 1995
Allegro 2000
Production variant with tapered-wings and gross weight of 1,148 lb (521 kg)
Allegro 2000F
Floatplane variant, with provisions for Full Lotus inflatable floats
Allegro SW
European microlight variant with 3.6 ft (1.10 m) shorter rectangular wings to save weight and gross weight limited to 454 kg (1,001 lb). The SW model has a cruise speed that is 6 kn (11 km/h) slower than the taper-winged models with the same power.
Allegro 2007
Improved variant with redesigned doors, 3 in (7.6 cm) more headroom, wing dihedral increased to improve the aircraft's handling qualities and gross weight increased to 1,320 lb (599 kg), the maximum in the US LSA category.

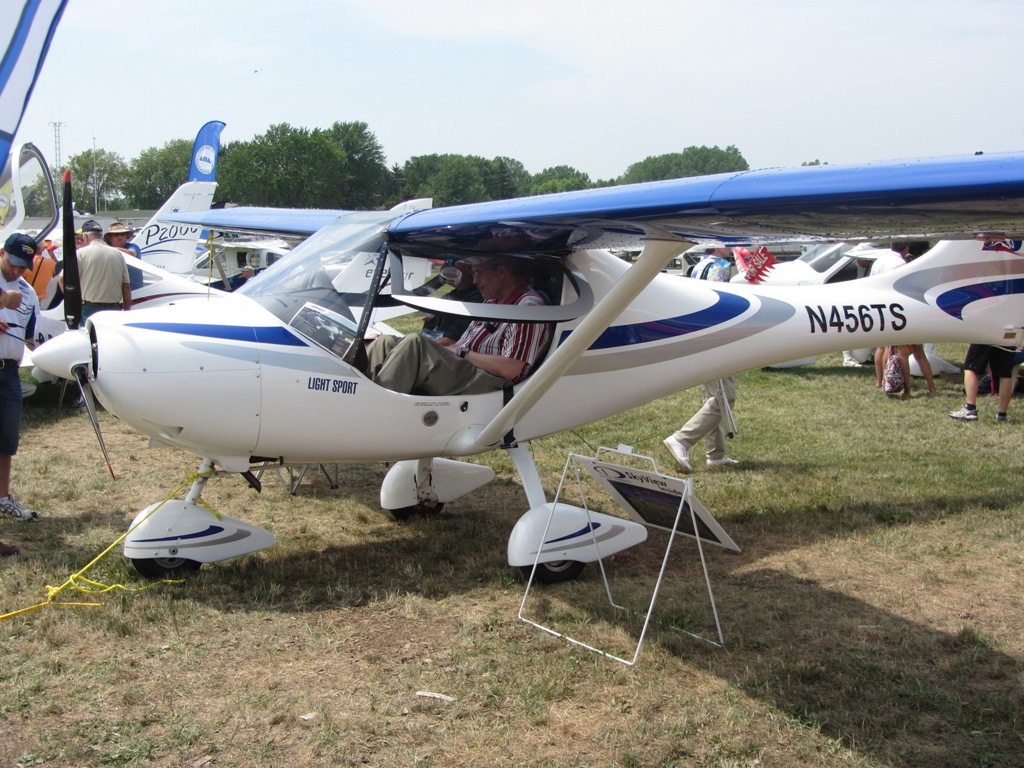
Allegro LSA

Allegro LSA
Light-sport aircraft variant built in the United States by AllegroLSA of Sanford, North Carolina. This model incorporates a taller cockpit, along with aerodynamic improvements that reduce the amount of rudder needed in a turn. Fuel capacity was increased to 63 litres (14 imp gal; 17 US gal)
Allegro F
Floatplane version made in the USA by B-Bar-D Aviation.

== Specifications (Allegro 2007) ==
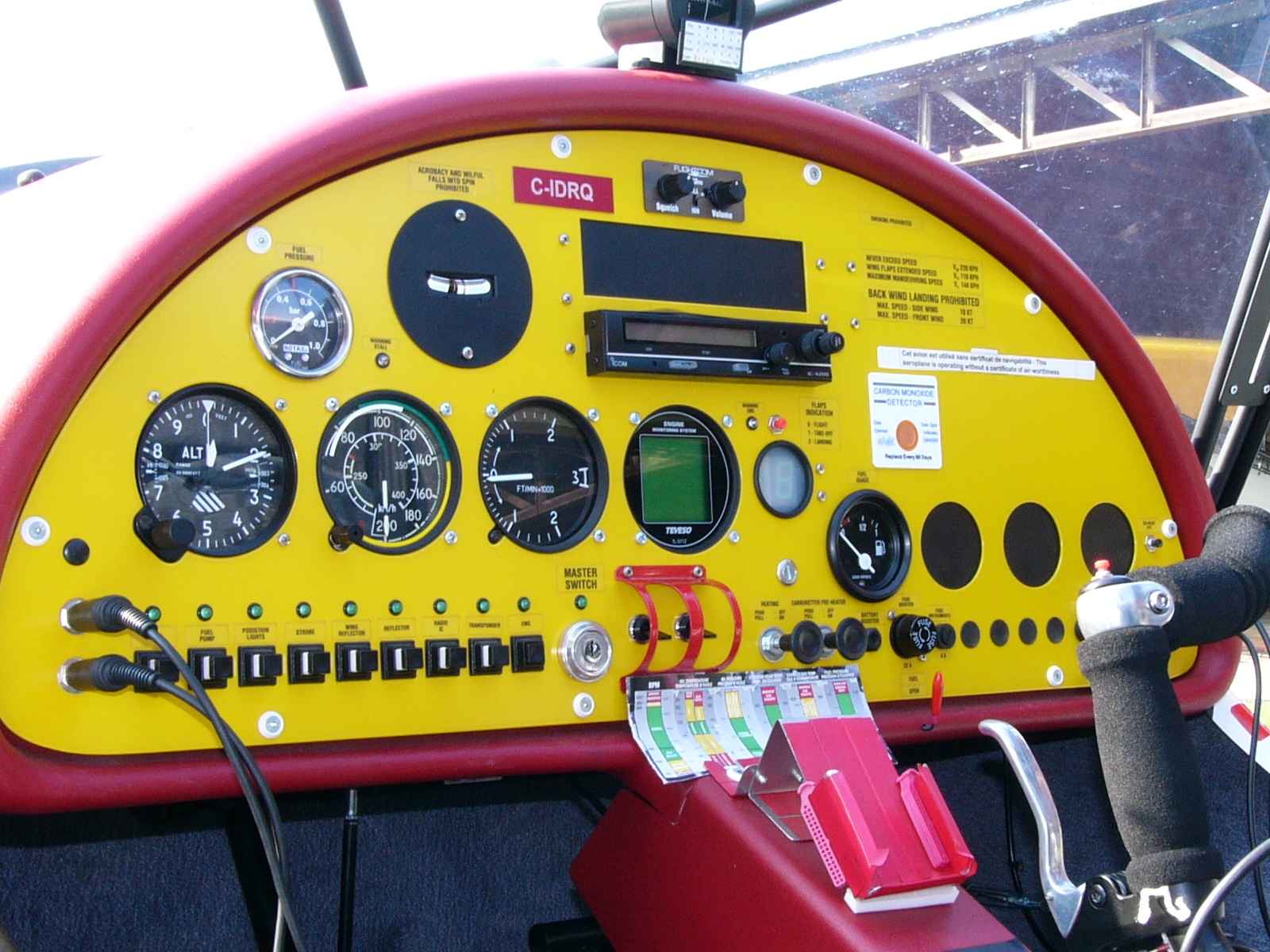
Allegro 2000 Instrument panel

Data from XAir Australia

General characteristics

- Crew: one
- Capacity: one passenger
- Length: 6.10 m (20 ft 0 in)
- Wingspan: 10.80 m (35 ft 5 in)
- Height: 2.10 m (6 ft 11 in)
- Wing area: 11.4 m^{2} (123 sq ft)
- Aspect ratio: 9.5:1
- Airfoil: SM 701
- Empty weight: 275 kg (606 lb)
- Gross weight: 599 kg (1,321 lb)
- Fuel capacity: 63 litre standard tanks, 103 litre long range tanks
- Powerplant: 1 × Rotax 912UL four stroke, four cylinder aircraft engine, 60 kW (80 hp)
- Propellers: 3-bladed Woodcomp

Performance

- Cruise speed: 176 km/h (109 mph, 95 kn)
- Stall speed: 65 km/h (40 mph, 35 kn)
- Never exceed speed: 219 km/h (136 mph, 118 kn)
- Range: 1,300 km (810 mi, 700 nmi)
- Service ceiling: 4,500 m (14,800 ft)
- Rate of climb: 5.00 m/s (985 ft/min)
