= Paradise P1 LSA =

Brazilian light-sport aircraft

P1
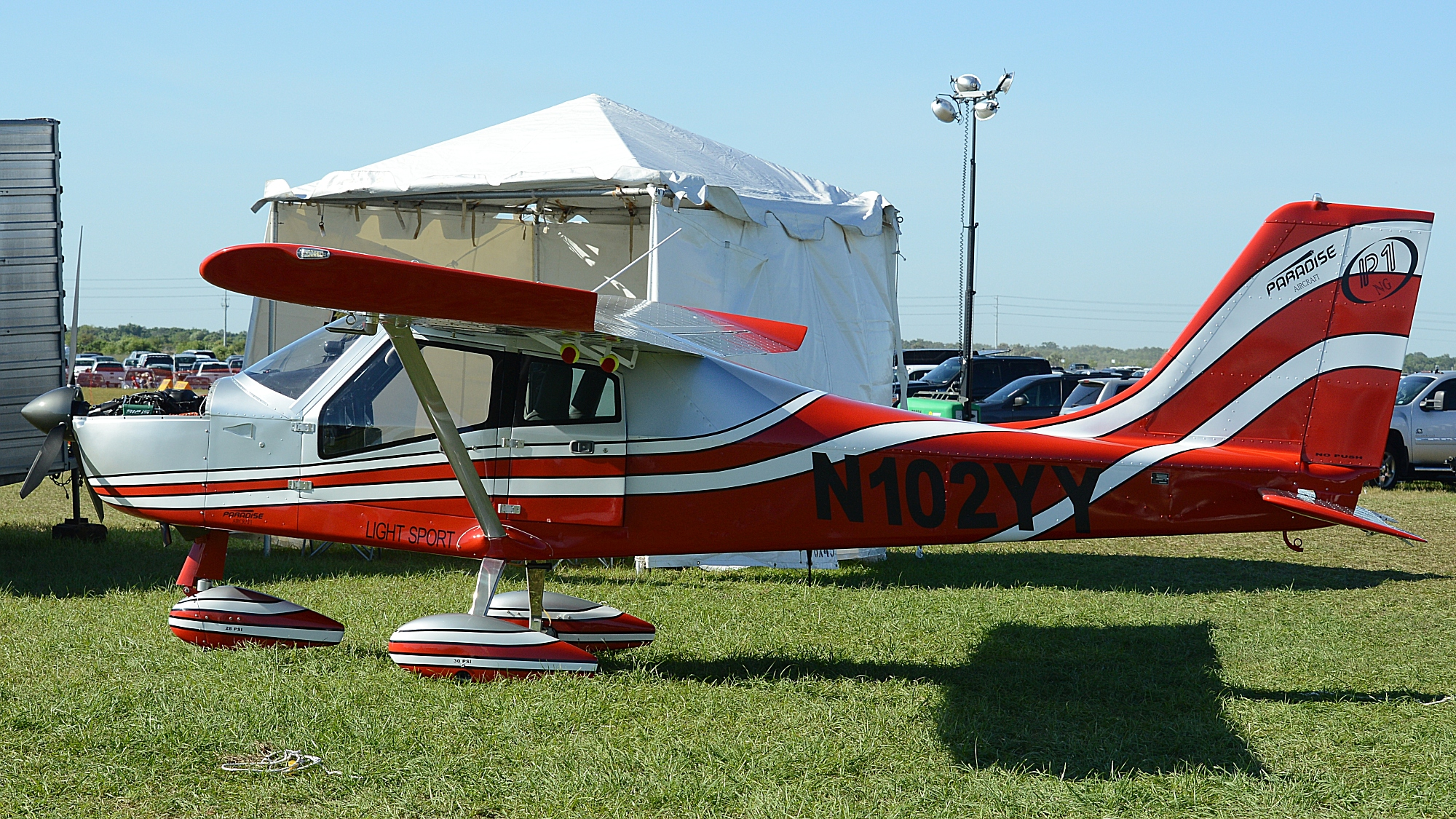

General information
- Type: Light-sport aircraft
- National origin: Brazil
- Manufacturer: Paradise Aircraft
- Status: In production (2015)

History
- Introduction date: 2008

The Paradise P1 LSA is a Brazilian light-sport aircraft, designed and produced by Paradise Aircraft of Feira de Santana and introduced in 2008. The aircraft is supplied as a complete ready-to-fly aircraft.

== Design and development ==
The P1 was designed to comply with the US light-sport aircraft rules and was accepted as a factory-built special light-sport aircraft in 2009. It features a strut-braced high wing, a two-seats-in-side-by-side configuration enclosed cockpit, fixed tricycle landing gear and a single engine in tractor configuration.

The aircraft is made from welded steel tubing covered in aluminum sheet. Its 9.0 m (29.5 ft) span wing has an area of 12.6 m^{2} (136 sq ft) and flaps. The standard engine is the 100 hp (75 kW) Rotax 912ULS four-stroke powerplant. The cockpit is 110 cm (43.3 in) wide.

Originally a production line was set up in the United States, in Sebring, Florida, but this was later closed and in 2015 the company was noted as having no US presence or representation, although production continued in Brazil.

In 2008 the design was accepted as a Federal Aviation Administration approved special light-sport aircraft.

== Operational history ==
In April 2016, there were twelve P-1s registered in the United States with the US Federal Aviation Administration.

== Specifications (P1) ==
Data from Bayerl and Tacke

General characteristics

- Crew: one
- Capacity: one passenger
- Wingspan: 9.0 m (29 ft 6 in)
- Wing area: 12.6 m^{2} (136 sq ft)
- Empty weight: 340 kg (750 lb)
- Gross weight: 600 kg (1,323 lb)
- Fuel capacity: 100 litres (22 imp gal; 26 US gal)
- Powerplant: 1 × Rotax 912ULS four cylinder, liquid and air-cooled, four stroke aircraft engine, 75 kW (101 hp)

Performance

- Maximum speed: 220 km/h (140 mph, 120 kn)
- Cruise speed: 185 km/h (115 mph, 100 kn)
- Stall speed: 58 km/h (36 mph, 31 kn)
- Rate of climb: 4.5 m/s (890 ft/min)
- Wing loading: 47.6 kg/m^{2} (9.7 lb/sq ft)
