= Light-sport aircraft =

Category of lightweight aircraft that are simple to fly

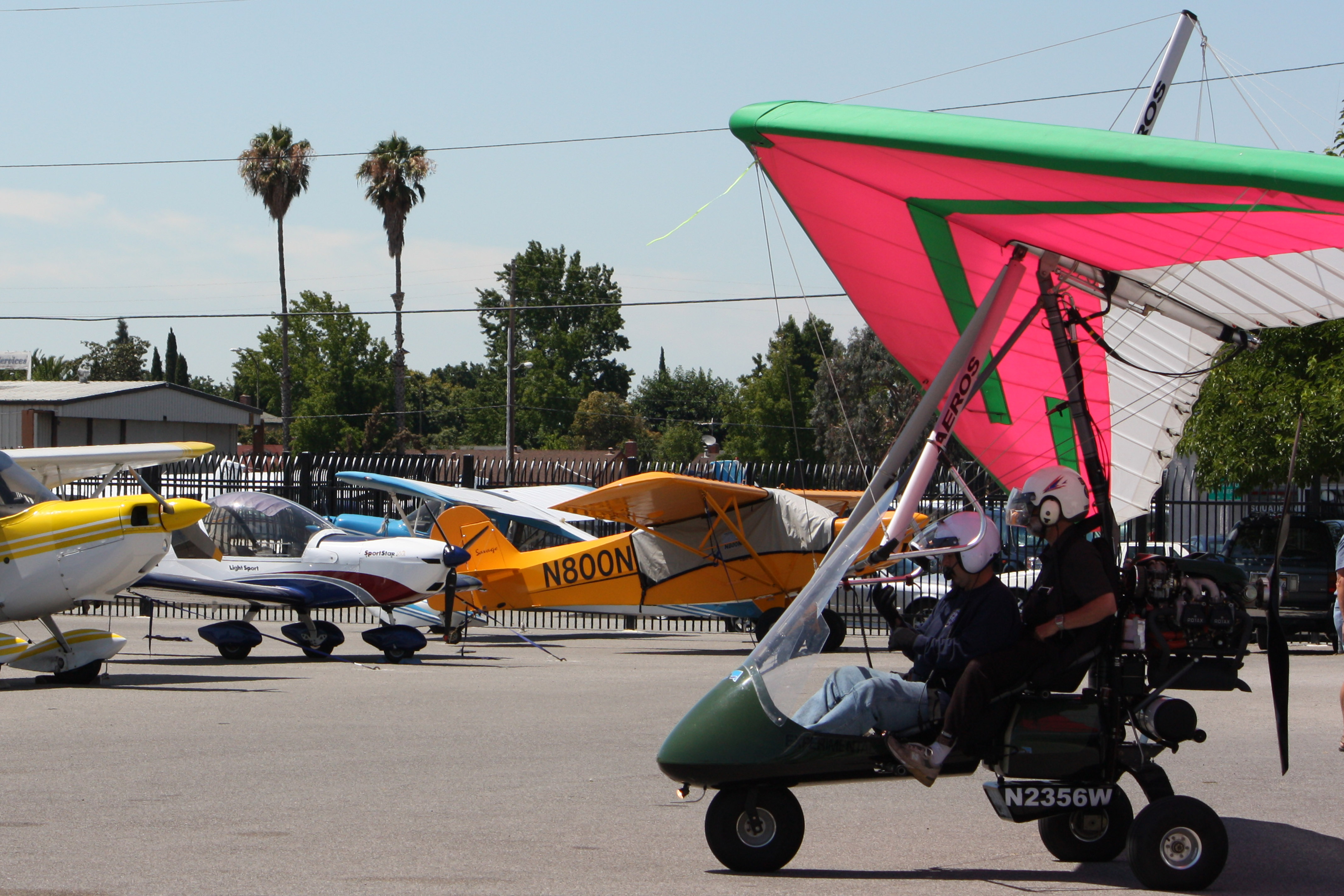
Three types of light sport aircraft. In the foreground, an E-LSA Antares USA Ranger weight-shift control trike. In the background, an S-LSA Evektor SportStar and an L-LSA Zlin Aviation Savage Cub.

A light-sport aircraft (LSA), or light sport aircraft, is a category of small, lightweight aircraft that are simple to fly. LSAs tend to be heavier and more sophisticated than ultralight (aka "microlight") aircraft, but LSA restrictions on weight and performance separates the category from established GA aircraft. There is no standard worldwide description of an LSA.

== LSAs in different countries ==
The civil aviation authorities in different countries have their own particular specifications and regulations which define the LSA category.

For example, in Australia the Civil Aviation Safety Authority defines a light-sport aircraft as a heavier-than-air or lighter-than-air craft, other than a helicopter, with a maximum gross takeoff weight of not more than 560 kg (1,235 lb) for lighter-than-air craft; 600 kg (1,323 lb) for heavier-than-air craft not intended for operation on water; or 650 kg (1,433 lb) for aircraft intended for operation on water. It must have a maximum stall speed of 45 knots (83 km/h; 52 mph) in landing configuration; a maximum of two seats; there is no limit on maximum speed unless it is a glider, which is limited to Vne 135 kn CAS; fixed undercarriage (except for amphibious aircraft, which may have repositionable gear, and gliders, which may have retractable gear); an unpressurized cabin; and a single non-turbine engine driving a propeller if it is a powered aircraft.

In the United States, several distinct groups of aircraft may be flown as light-sport. Existing certificated aircraft and experimental, amateur-built aircraft that fall within the definition listed in 14CFR1.1 are acceptable, as are aircraft built to an industry consensus standard rather than FAA airworthiness requirements. The accepted consensus standard is defined by ASTM International Technical Committee F37. Aircraft built to the consensus standard may be factory-built and sold with a special airworthiness certification (S-LSA) or may be assembled from a kit under the experimental rules (E-LSA) under experimental airworthiness. A company must have produced and certified at least one S-LSA in order to be permitted to sell E-LSA kits of the same model. E-LSA kits are not subject to the normal experimental amateur built (E-AB) requirement 14 CFR 21.191 which identifies an aircraft, the "major portion of which has been fabricated and assembled by persons who undertook the construction project solely for their own education or recreation."

=== United States ===
The FAA defines a light sport aircraft as an aircraft, other than a helicopter or powered lift, that since its original certification, has continued to meet the following:

1. Max. gross takeoff weight: 1,320 lb (600 kg) (1,430 lb (650 kg) for seaplanes)
2. Max. stall speed: 45 knots (83 km/h; 52 mph) CAS
3. Max. speed in level flight (at sea level In the U.S. Standard Atmosphere): 120 knots (220 km/h; 140 mph) CAS
4. Max. seats: two
5. Max. engines / motors: one (if powered)
6. Propeller: fixed-pitch or ground adjustable
7. Cabin: unpressurized
8. Fixed-pitch, semi-rigid, teetering, two-blade rotor system, if a gyroplane
9. Landing gear: fixed (except for seaplanes and gliders)

==== Aircraft licensing ====
- Can be manufactured and sold ready-to-fly under a new special light sport aircraft certification category. Aircraft must meet industry consensus standards. Aircraft under this certification may be used for sport and recreation, flight training, and aircraft rental.
- Can be licensed experimental light sport aircraft (E-LSA) if kit- or plans-built. Aircraft under this certification may be used only for sport and recreation and flight instruction for the owner of the aircraft.
- Can be licensed experimental light sport aircraft (E-LSA) if the aircraft has previously been operated as an ultralight but does not meet the FAR Part 103 definition of an ultralight vehicle. These aircraft must have been transitioned to E-LSA category no later than January 31, 2008.
- Will have a standard FAA registration - N-number.
- Category and class includes: airplane (land/sea), gyroplane, airship, balloon, weight-shift-control ("trike", land/sea), glider, and powered parachute.
- U.S. or foreign manufacture of light sport aircraft is authorized.
- Aircraft with a standard airworthiness certificate that meet above specifications may be flown by sport pilots. However, the aircraft must remain in standard category and cannot be changed to light sport aircraft category.
- May be operated at night if the aircraft is equipped per FAR 91.205, if such operations are allowed by the aircraft's operating limitations and the pilot holds at least a private pilot certificate and a minimum of a third-class medical.

==== FAA certification ====
Several different kinds of aircraft may be certificated as LSA. Airplanes (both powered and gliders), rotorcraft (gyroplanes only, not helicopters), powered parachutes, weight-shift control aeroplanes (commonly known as trikes), and lighter-than-air craft (free balloons and airships) may all be certificated as LSA if they fall within the weight and other guidelines established by the local governing authority.

The US definition of an LSA is similar to some other countries' definition of "microlight" or "ultralight" aircraft. Other countries' microlight definitions are typically less restrictive, not limiting airspeed, the use of variable-pitch propellers, or the 1,320 pounds (600 kg) gross weight limitation.

By contrast, the US FAA has a separate definition of ultralight aircraft defined in Federal Aviation Regulations. Aircraft falling within the US ultralight specifications are extremely lightweight (less than 254 pounds if powered, or 155 pounds if unpowered), are intended for operation by a single occupant, have a fuel capacity of five US gallons (about 19 litres) or less, a maximum calibrated airspeed of not more than 55 knots (102 km/h; 63 mph), and a maximum stall speed of not more than 24 knots (44 km/h; 28 mph). Ultralight aircraft in the US do not require pilot licensing, medical certification, or aircraft registration.

Aircraft certified as light-sport aircraft exceed the limitations defined for ultralight aircraft and require that the pilot possess, at a minimum, a sport pilot certificate. Among these aircraft were found those that were specifically designed to meet the LSA requirements, as well as overweight ultralights (commonly known as "fat ultralights") that previously were operated in technical violation of 14 CFR 103.

In addition to aircraft specifically designed to meet the LSA requirements, certain certificated aircraft, such as the original Piper Cub, happen to fall within the definition of a light-sport aircraft and can be operated by individuals holding FAA sport pilot certificates. The aircraft can not be re-certificated as LSA, however: although sport pilots may operate conventionally certificated aircraft that fall within the definition of an LSA, the aircraft themselves continue to be certificated in their original categories.

Several designers and manufacturers of experimental aircraft kits have developed models that are compliant with the light-sport aircraft rules.

In June 2012 the FAA indicated that they would re-visit the LSA program after their own studies indicated that "the majority" of LSA manufacturers they had inspected failed to show that they were in compliance with the standards. The FAA announcement said that as a result the "original policy of reliance on manufacturers' Statements of Compliance" ... "should be reconsidered." AOPA points out that this is a normal development of a maturing standard and does not expect any significant changes in the rules, only more scrutiny by FAA to assure compliance.

The FAA announced on July 24, 2023, that it was considering expanding the Light Sport Aircraft category to incorporate the development of emerging technologies, in particular electrically powered rotorcraft.

==== LSA under the new MOSAIC spectrum ====
The LSA category was drastically expanded with the introduction of MOSAIC (Modernization of Special Airworthiness Certification). Among the main changes was the elimination of the current limitation on maximum weight, based on parameters related to stall speed, which is now 61 knots with the aircraft in landing configuration or with fixed or automatic high-lift devices (instead of the previous 45 knots). This allows for larger aircraft with up to 4 seats thus enabling increased safety margins, durability, and comfort for new aircraft certified under this new standard. MOSAIC was entered into the Federal Register on July 22, 2025. This final rule was effective October 22, 2025, except for amendatory instructions 3, 8, 9, 13, 15, 17, 21, 23 through 26, 71, 72, 75, 76, and 80, which became effective July 24, 2026.

==== FAA certified models ====
Aircraft that met light-sport requirements when the rules were announced appear in an FAA list Some additional models of S-LSA, E-LSA and E-AB aircraft that meet light-sport requirements are listed here. The FAA maintains a complete list of approved SLSA aircraft models.

Light sport aircraft (partial list)
Manufacturer	Design	Engine	Max. cruise	Max. range	Orders	Availability	Type
3Xtrim	3Xtrim Navigator 600	100 HP Rotax 912 S	104 kn (193 km/h)	747 NM		2008	Certified
Advanced Composites Solutions	ACS-100 Sora		120 kn (220 km/h)				Kit
Aeropro / fly-Aerotrek.com	Aerotrek A240 (tricycle gear) or A220 (taildragger) (EuroFox)	Rotax 912 A/ 912 S	115 kn (213 km/h)	570 nmi (1,060 km)	300+ sold	since 1990	Certified
Aeroprakt Manufacturing	A-22LS (tricycle gear)	Rotax 912UL, Rotax 912ULS or Rotax 912 iS	110 kn (200 km/h)	594 nmi (1,100 km)		since 2016	Certified
AMD	Zodiac 650B (S-LSA)	Continental O-200 + Others	120 kn (220 km/h)				Certified
Aviasud Engineering	Aviasud Mistral	Rotax 582 DCDI	65 kn (120 km/h)	270 nmi (500 km)			Certified
BOT Aircraft	SC07 Speed Cruiser	Rotax 912ULS or D-Motor LF26	116 kn (215 km/h)	648 nmi (1,200 km)		2016	E-LSA, pending S-LSA certification
Breezer	Breezer	Rotax 912 UL2	96 kn (178 km/h)	497 nmi (920 km)			
CGS Aviation	Hawk Arrow II SLSA	Rotax 582, Rotax 912 F, HKS 700e, HKS 700T, Jabiru 2200	70 kn (130 km/h)	130 NM	170+ (since 1992)	2008	Certified
Cessna	Cessna 162	Continental O-200D	112 kn (207 km/h)	470 nmi (870 km)	195 (Feb 2014). 80 in stock for spares	Since 2009 - discontinued Feb 2014	Certified
Cirrus Design	Cirrus SRS	Rotax 912 S	120 kn (220 km/h)			Unknown, project suspended	Certified
Comco Ikarus	Ikarus C42 (80 hp)	Rotax 912 F	105 kn 194 km/h				Certified
Cub Crafters	CubCrafters CC11-160 Carbon Cub SS	Titan 340CC, 180 HP	88 kn (163 km/h)	391 nmi (724 km)	300+	2009	ELSA Kit/Certified
Czech Sport Aircraft	SportCruiser/PiperSport	Rotax 912 S	118 kn (219 km/h)	600 nmi (1,100 km)	170+ delivered	Available since 2006	Certified
Czech Sport Aircraft/Wet Aero USA	CZAW Mermaid	Jabiru 3300 or Rotax 912S	110 kn (200 km/h)	450 nmi (830 km)		2006	Certified
DOVA Aircraft	DV-1 SKYLARK	Rotax 912S	12,419 kn (23,000 km/h)	539 nmi (998 km)		2004	Certified
Ekolot	Ekolot KR-030 Topaz	Rotax 912UL	119 kn (137 mph)			2010 (Poland)	LSA Certified
Europa Aircraft	Europa XS	Rotax 912 / 912 ULS / 914 or Jabiru Aircraft	120 kn (220 km/h)	750 NM		2009	Kit
FANTASY AIR	Allegro 2007	Rotax 912 F or 912 S	119 kn (220 km/h)	750 nmi (1,390 km)		2008	Certified
FK-Lightplanes	FK12 Comet	Rotax 912UL/ULS, 914, or Lycoming IO-233	97 kn (112 mph)	351 nm (404 mi)		1997	Certified
Flight Design	Flight Design CTsw: CTLS: CTLSi	Rotax 912S; Rotax 912iS	120 kn (220 km/h)	850 nmi (1,570 km)	350+	2005	Certified
Higher Class Aviation	Sport Hornet LRS	Rotax 912 F or Rotax 582	100 kn (190 km/h)	450 nmi (830 km)	040+	2009	Certified
JIHLAVAN airplanes, s.r.o.	Skyleader 600	Rotax 912 100 hp & 115 hp	120 kn (220 km/h)	860 nmi (1,590 km)		Available	Certified
JMB Aircraft	VL3	Rotax 916	180 kn (330 km/h)	1500 nmi (2,700 km)	500+	since 2012	Certified
ICON Aircraft	ICON A5	Rotax 912 iS	105 kn (121 mph; 194 km/h)	300 nmi (350 mi; 560 km)	1500+	2015	FAA Approved
Kitfox Aircraft	Denney Kitfox	Rotax 912 S	109 kn (202 km/h)	530 nmi (980 km)	4000+ (since 1984)	2008	ELSA Kit/Certified
Paradise Aircraft	Paradise P-1	100 HP, Rotax 912 S	120 kn (220 km/h)	747 nmi (1,383 km)		2008	Certified
Pipistrel	Pipistrel Sinus LSA	Rotax 912 80 hp	120 kn (220 km/h)	790 nmi (1,460 km)	1000+ (Sinus and Virus combined)	since 1995	Certified LSA Airplane & Glider RTF & Kit
Pipistrel	Pipistrel Virus LSA	Rotax 912 80 hp	120 kn (220 km/h)	790 nmi (1,460 km)	1000+ (Sinus and Virus combined)	since 1999	Certified LSA Airplane & Glider RTF & Kit
Pipistrel	Pipistrel Virus SW LSA	Rotax 912 80 hp & 100 hp	120 kn (220 km/h)	790 nmi (1,460 km)	1000+ (Sinus and Virus combined)	since 2008	Certified LSA Airplane & Glider RTF & Kit
Pipistrel	Pipistrel Taurus LSA	Rotax 503, 55 hp	120 kn (220 km/h)	150 nmi (280 km)		since 2004	Certified LSA Glider RTF
Pipistrel	Pipistrel Alpha Trainer	Rotax 912 80 hp	120 kn (220 km/h)	790 nmi (1,460 km)		since 2012	Certified LSA Airplane RTF
Progressive Aerodyne	SeaRey Elite LSA	Rotax 914	91 kn (105 mph)	379 nmi (436 mi; 702 km)			LSA Kit/Certified
Progressive Aerodyne	SeaRey Sport LSA	Rotax 912UL	80 kn (92 mph)	363 nmi (418 mi; 672 km)			LSA Certified
Rainbow Aircraft (pty) ltd.	Cheetah XLS	Rotax 912 or Rotax 582 or Jabiru 2200A	83 kn (154 km/h)	450 nmi (830 km)	100+	2001	ELSA Kit/Certified
Remos Aircraft	Remos G-3	Rotax 912 S, 100HP	120 kn (220 km/h)	550 nmi (1,020 km)		2007	Certified
Remos Aircraft	Remos GX	Rotax 912 S 100HP	115 kn (213 km/h)	450 nmi (830 km)			Certified
Renegade Light Sport originally T&T Aviation	Falcon LS	Lycoming IO-233-LSA	112 kn (129 mph)	460 nmi (529 mi)		2010	LSA Certified
Skyeton	Skyeton K-10 Swift	Rotax 912 S, 100HP	120 kn (220 km/h)	486 nmi (900 km)		2006	Certified
SkyRunner, LLC.	SkyRunner MK 3.2	914 UL	35 kn (40 mph; 65 km/h)	120 nm		2016	FAA Approved / S-LSA
Sling Aircraft	Sling 2	Rotax 912 iS or 912 ULS	120 kn (220 km/h)	750 nmi (1,390 km)	320+	2010	Certified RTF & Kit
TL Ultralight	TL Ultralight TL-96 Star	Rotax 912 F	120 kn (220 km/h)	790 nmi (1,460 km)	70+	Available	Certified
Storm Aircraft	Storm Rally	Rotax 912 S	120 kn (220 km/h)	450 nmi (830 km)		2004	Certified
Storm Aircraft	Storm Century	Rotax 912 S	120 kn (220 km/h)	450 nmi (830 km)		2004	Certified
Tecnam Aircraft	Tecnam P2004	Rotax 912 S	116 kn (215 km/h)		100+	2005	Certified
Terrafugia	Terrafugia Transition	Rotax 912 S (when certified)	93 kn (107 mph)	450 nmi (520 mi)	100	2012	Experimental/Certification planned (As of April 2012)
Van's Aircraft	RV-12iS	Rotax 912 iS	117 kn (217 km/h)	564 nmi (1,045 km)	1000+	2008	ELSA Kit/Certified

=== Europe ===
In June 2011, the European Aviation Safety Agency published CS-LSA "Certification Specifications for Light Sport Aeroplanes". This introduced a new category of manufactured sport aeroplanes similar to the light-sport category found in the US and elsewhere.

=== Australia ===
A new certification category for 'Light Sport Aircraft' came into effect on 7 January 2006. This category does not replace the previous categories, but created a new category with the following characteristics:

- A maximum take-off weight of 600 or 650 kg (1,323 or 1,433 lb) for an aircraft intended and configured for operation on water or 560 kg (1,235 lb) for a lighter-than-air aircraft.
- A maximum stalling speed in the landing configuration (Vso) of 45 kn (83 km/h) CAS.
- Maximum of two occupants, including the pilot.
- A fixed landing gear. A glider may have retractable landing gear. (For an aircraft intended for operation on water, a fixed or repositionable landing gear)
- A single, non-turbine engine fitted with a propeller.
- A non-pressurised cabin.
- If the aircraft is a glider, a maximum never exceed speed (Vne) of 135 kn (250 km/h) CAS

Light-sport aircraft can be factory-manufactured aircraft or kits for amateur-building.

=== Japan ===
On 26 December 2022, Japan Civil Aviation Bureau amended the Circular of Aircraft Safety No.1-006 and clarified its own stance on LSA. The significant difference between Japan and other countries described above is that LSA in Japan is defined as a type of Experimental aircraft, i.e., non-certified aircraft, similar to amateur-built aircraft but rather than practical aircraft, i.e., certified aircraft. Permission for Test Flights etc. by Minister of Land, Infrastructure, Transport and Tourism is necessary to operate LSA in Japan as well as other non-certified aircraft. In order to operate the LSA in Japan, the aircraft, like other non-certified aircraft, requires permission for test flights, etc. from the Minister of Land, Infrastructure, Transport and Tourism. Because the LSA flight is nominally a test flight of an unknown experimental aircraft, the pilot may not have a license and the flight range is basically restricted to within 3 km of the takeoff/landing point avoiding residential areas. If the pilot of the LSA intends to fly outside of the above range or to land outside of the takeoff point, the pilot must have a Private Pilot license or a higher license and an effective aviation medical certificate. The required characteristics of LSA in Japan are modeled after those of S-LSAs in the United States. On the other hand, the E-LSA classification has not been introduced, so kit-built and plan-built LSAs are regarded as amateur-built aircraft. Imported LSA certified as CS-LSA is considered LSA on an exceptional basis, even if it does not meet the characteristics of LSA in Japan.

- Maximum gross takeoff weight: 1,320 lbs or 1,430 lbs for seaplanes
- Maximum speed in level flight: 120 kn CAS
- Maximum stall speed: 45 kn CAS
- Maximum seats: two
- Maximum engines: one (reciprocating engine only)
- Propeller: fixed-pitch or ground adjustable
- Cabin: unpressurized
- Landing gear: fixed (except for seaplanes)
- Other requirements: Designed, manufactured, and quality assured by manufacturer and complied to ASTM standards of LSA.

== See also ==
- Canadian advanced ultralight aircraft
- List of ultralight helicopters
