= Progressive Aerodyne Stingray =

American amateur-built aircraft

Stingray

General information
- Type: Homebuilt aircraft
- National origin: United States
- Manufacturer: Progressive Aerodyne
- Status: Production completed
- Number built: at least nine

History
- Introduction date: 1990s

The Progressive Aerodyne Stingray is an American homebuilt flying boat that was designed by and produced by Progressive Aerodyne of Orlando, Florida, introduced in the 1990s. When it was available the aircraft was supplied as a kit for amateur construction.

== Design and development ==
The Stingray features a strut-braced parasol wing, a single-seat enclosed cockpit under a bubble canopy, retractable conventional landing gear and a single engine in pusher configuration.

The aircraft is made from a combination of metal tubing, with its flying surfaces covered in Dacron sailcloth doped aircraft fabric and a reinforced fiberglass hull. Its 30.83 ft (9.4 m) span wing has a wing area of 150.0 sq ft (13.94 m^{2}) and is supported by a central pylon behind the cockpit, "V" struts and jury struts. The wing also mounts outrigger pontoons that provide stability on the water. The acceptable power range is 40 to 65 hp (30 to 48 kW) and the standard engine used is the 40 hp (30 kW) Rotax 447 twin cylinder, two stroke powerplant.

The Stingray has a typical empty weight of 475 lb (215 kg) and a gross weight of 800 lb (360 kg), giving a useful load of 325 lb (147 kg). With full fuel of 6 U.S. gallons (23 L; 5.0 imp gal) the payload for the pilot and baggage is 289 lb (131 kg).

The standard day, sea level, no wind, take off on land with a 40 hp (30 kW) engine is 190 ft (58 m) and the landing roll is 220 ft (67 m).

The manufacturer estimates the construction time from the supplied kit as 350 hours.

== Operational history ==
By 1998 the company reported that five aircraft were completed and flying.

In January 2014 four examples were registered in the United States with the Federal Aviation Administration, although a total of nine had been registered at one time.

== Specifications (Stingray) ==
Data from AeroCrafter

General characteristics

- Crew: one
- Length: 25.42 ft (7.75 m)
- Wingspan: 30.83 ft (9.40 m)
- Wing area: 150.0 sq ft (13.94 m^{2})
- Empty weight: 475 lb (215 kg)
- Gross weight: 800 lb (363 kg)
- Fuel capacity: 6 U.S. gallons (23 L; 5.0 imp gal)
- Powerplant: 1 × Rotax 447 twin cylinder, air-cooled, two stroke aircraft engine, 40 hp (30 kW)
- Propellers: 2-bladed fixed pitch

Performance

- Maximum speed: 85 mph (137 km/h, 74 kn)
- Cruise speed: 70 mph (110 km/h, 61 kn)
- Stall speed: 27 mph (43 km/h, 23 kn)
- Range: 100 mi (160 km, 87 nmi)
- Service ceiling: 9,000 ft (2,700 m)
- Rate of climb: 600 ft/min (3.0 m/s)
- Wing loading: 5.3 lb/sq ft (26 kg/m^{2})

== See also ==
- List of flying boats and floatplanes
