= CZAW Mermaid =

Czech amphibious light-sport aircraft

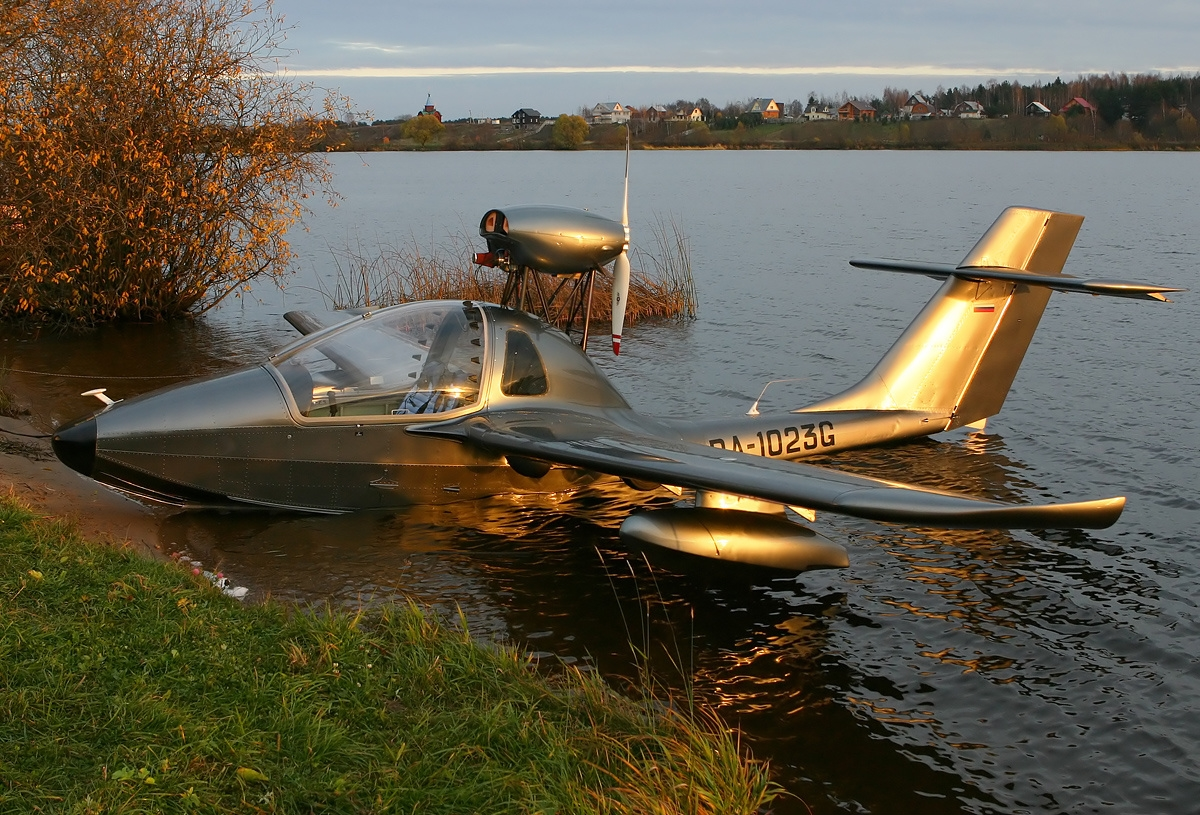

General information
- Type: Light-sport aircraft
- National origin: Czech Republic
- Manufacturer: Czech Sport Aircraft
- Designer: Production completed

The CZAW Mermaid is an amphibious flying boat light-sport aircraft produced by Czech Sport Aircraft in the Czech Republic.

== Design and development ==
The Mermaid has a composite hull and aluminum wings, with pusher configuration engine and a cruciform tail. Its 9.5 m (31.2 ft) span mid-wing has an area of 11.5 m^{2} (124 sq ft) and is equipped with flaps. The standard engine is the 120 hp (89 kW) Jabiru 3300 four-stroke powerplant.

By December 2012 the aircraft was no longer offered for sale by CSA.

== Specifications (CZAW Mermaid) ==
Data from Bayerl

General characteristics

- Crew: one
- Capacity: one passenger
- Wingspan: 9.5 m (31 ft 2 in)
- Wing area: 11.5 m^{2} (124 sq ft)
- Empty weight: 380 kg (838 lb)
- Gross weight: 560 kg (1,235 lb)
- Fuel capacity: 100 litres (22 imp gal; 26 US gal)
- Powerplant: 1 × Jabiru 3300 six cylinder, air-cooled, four stroke aircraft engine, 89 kW (120 hp)

Performance

- Maximum speed: 210 km/h (130 mph, 110 kn)
- Cruise speed: 185 km/h (115 mph, 100 kn)
- Stall speed: 65 km/h (40 mph, 35 kn)
- Rate of climb: 4 m/s (790 ft/min)
