= Ivan Klymko =

Ukrainian ceramist, painter (1930–2007)

- Іван Миколайович Климко
- Born: 22 July 1930; Zushytsi, Austria-Hungary (now Ukraine)
- Died: 16 December 2007 (aged 77); Lviv
- Education: Lviv Ivan Trush School of Applied Arts, Lviv Institute of Applied and Decorative Arts
- Occupations: Ceramist, painter

Ivan Klymko (Ukrainian: Іван Миколайович Климко; 22 July 1930 – 16 December 2007) was a Ukrainian ceramist, painter. From 1980 he is a member of the National Union of Artists of Ukraine.

== Biography ==
Ivan Klymko was born on 22 July 1930 in Zushytsi, now Zavereshytsia, in the Lviv Oblast.

In 1952, he graduated from the Lviv Ivan Trush School of Applied Arts (teachers: Ivan Severa, Oleksa Shatkivskyi, Hryhorii Smolskyi, Yaroslav Nanovskyi, Taras Porozhniak), and in 1963 from the Lviv Institute of Applied and Decorative Arts (teacher: Ivan Severa).

From 1963 he taught at the Kosiv School of Applied Arts. During 1967–2003, he was active in the creative workshop that functioned at the Lviv Experimental Ceramic and Sculpture Factory. At the same time, in 1968–1969, he worked as a senior artist at the Berehove Majolica Factory in Zakarpattia Oblast. In 1975–1978, he was a teacher at the Yaniv Carving School, which is now located in the rural settlement of Ivano-Frankove.

He died on 16 December 2007 in Lviv.

== Creativity ==
From the 1970s, he participated in regional, national and international exhibitions. In 1978, 1985 and 1993, he held personal exhibitions in Lviv.

He worked in the fields of decorative and applied ceramics, monumental ceramic plastics, easel sculpture, and painting. In his painting, Klymko gradually moved from generalized, flat and decorative solutions in the 1960s to a "new subject matter" that had a clear three-dimensional and material definition of forms with a general conventionality of spatial and compositional solutions, as well as a decorative sound of color. In his best works, Klymko uses Ukrainian folk traditions, which manifest laconicism with figurative and plastic language, as well as the composure of monumentalized structures and folklore and historical themes. Some of his works are kept in the collections of the Lviv Art Gallery and the National Museum of Lviv, as well as in private collections and abroad (in particular in the United States, Canada, Germany, and the Czech Republic).

The most important works:

- ceramic plastics: "Perebendia" (1969), "Duma pro trokh brativ", "Kryvonis Maksym" (both — 1971), "Kozak Mamai" (1973), "Na Ivana Kupala" (1986);
- sculpture "Nizhnist" (1973);
- lantern "Tini zabutykh predkiv" (1975);
- ceramic compositions: "Simia" (1975), "Verkhovyna" (1987);
- kumans: "Divchyna", "Bortsi", "Levy";
- candlesticks: Olen-triitsia", "Kozatska vezha" (all — 1979), "Tarasove natkhnennia" (1987);
- decorative plates: "Haivky" (1978), "Hei, tam na hori zhnetsi" (1980), "Try hutsulky", "Surmach", "Sutychka bilia Zolotykh vorit" (all — 1982), "Simia vecheria kolo khaty" (1983), "Ridna zemlia — kazka" (1986);
- panels: "Harbari" (1984), "Try zozuli z poklonom" (1988), "Kozatska duma", "Kozatskyi kish", "Nadiia. Vira. Liubov" (all — 1989);
- painting: "Kozatska pohonia" (1976), "Buket u hlechyku" (1980), "Chovny", "Snov-rika" (both — 1983), "Vichnyi kozak" (1986), "Zapakh khliba i zhasmynu", "Pered Velykodnem" (both — 1992), "Shche ne vmerla Ukraina" (1996).
