= Ekolot =

Polish aircraft manufacturer

PPHU Ekolot
- Company type: Privately held company
- Industry: Aerospace
- Founded: 1995
- Headquarters: Korczyna, Podkarpackie Voivodeship, Poland
- Key people: Director: Henryk Słowik
- Products: Kit aircraft, ultralight aircraft, motor gliders, light-sport aircraft
- Website: www.ekolot.pl

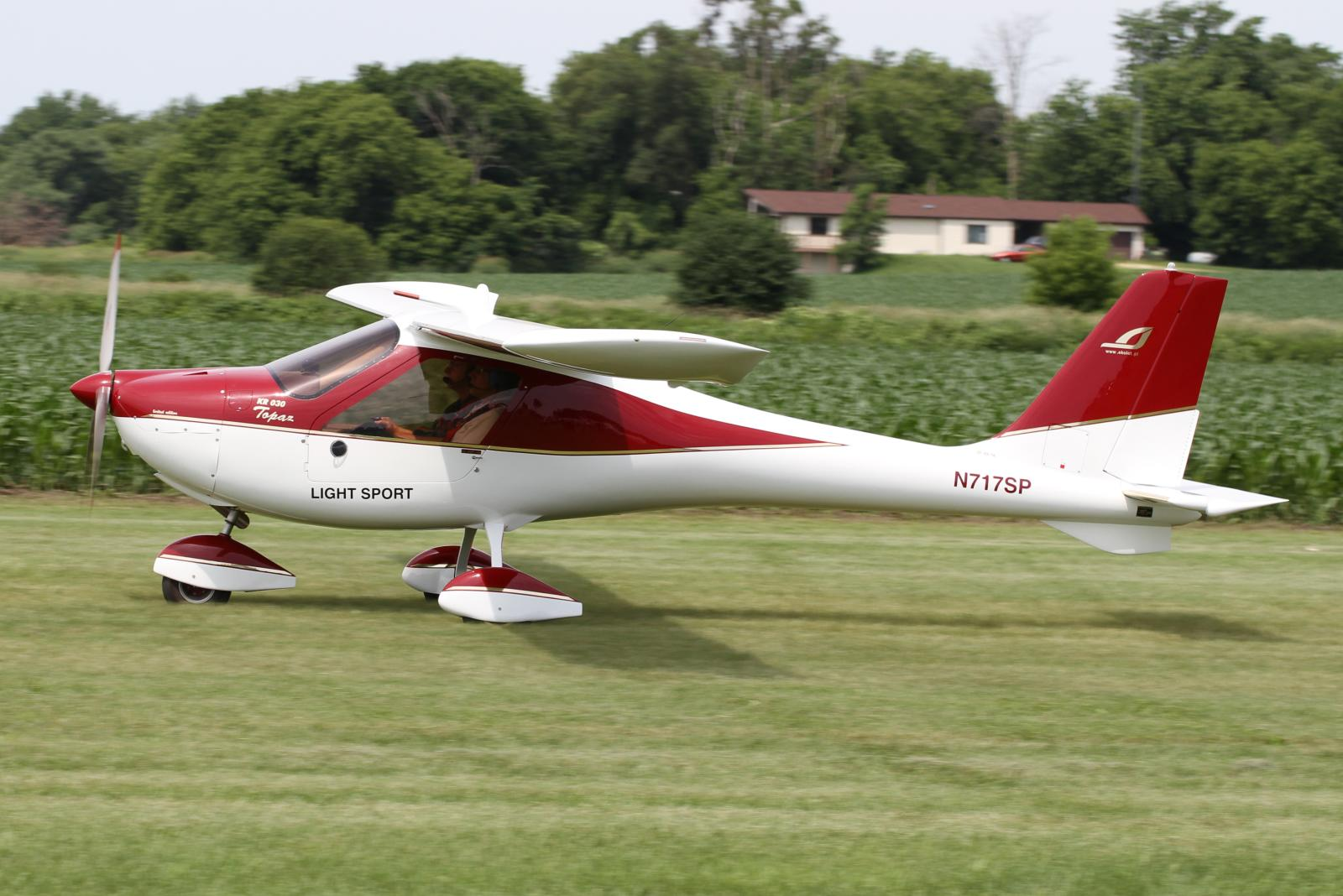
Ekolot KR-030 Topaz

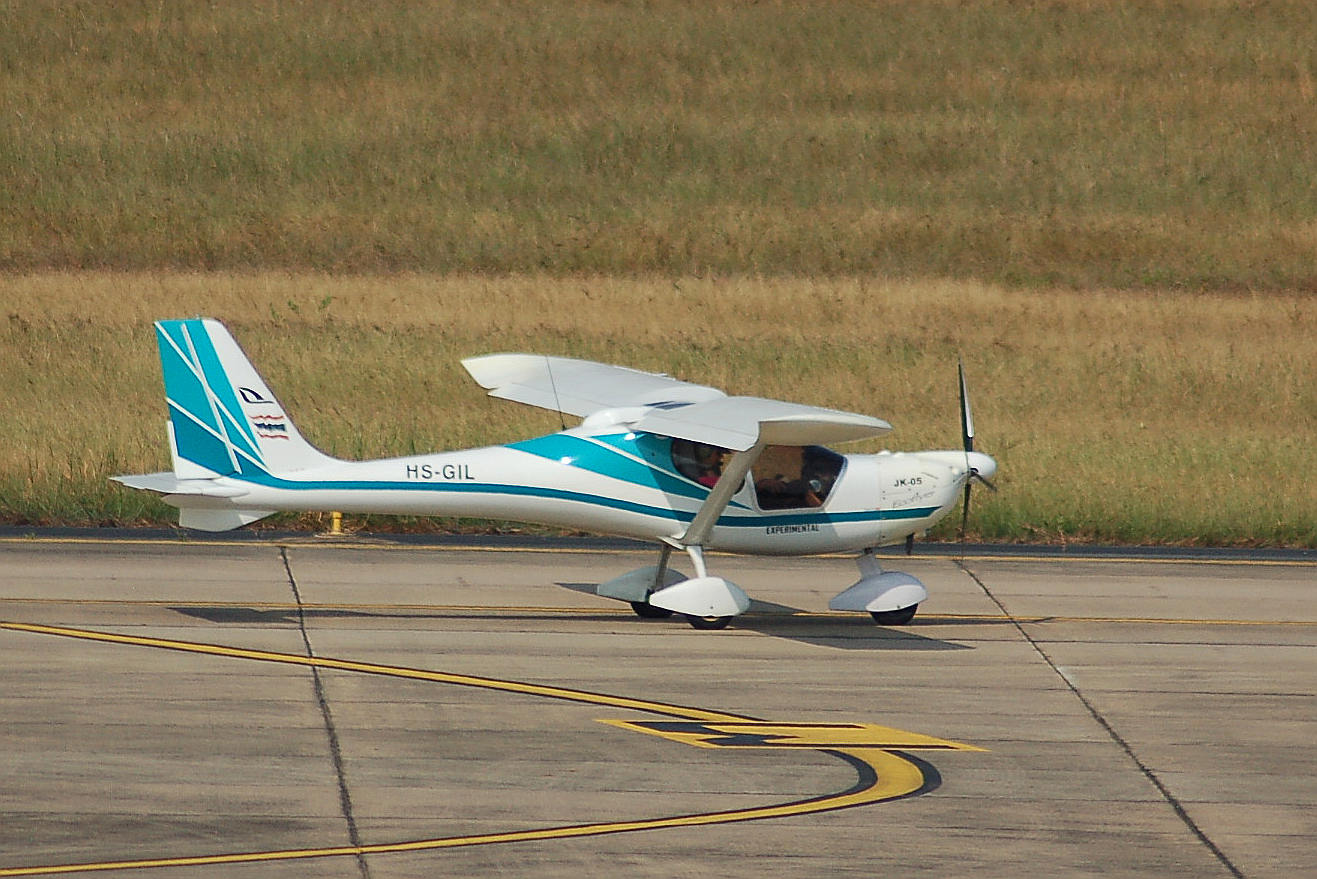
Ekolot JK-05L Junior

PPHU Ekolot is a Polish aircraft manufacturer based in Korczyna, Podkarpackie Voivodeship, with its factory in Krosno. The company was formed in 1995 and its director is Henryk Słowik.

The company specializes in the design and manufacture of ultralight aircraft in the form of kits for amateur construction and ready-to-fly aircraft for the Fédération Aéronautique Internationale microlight and the American light-sport aircraft categories.

Working in composite materials, the company produces the Jerzy Krawczyk-designed Ekolot JK 01A Elf motorglider and two ultralight aircraft, the strut-braced Ekolot JK-05L Junior and the cantilever-wing Ekolot KR-030 Topaz. The Topaz has been accepted by the US Federal Aviation Administration as a light-sport aircraft.

== Aircraft ==
Summary of aircraft built by Ekolot
Model name	First flight	Number built	Type
Ekolot JK 01A Elf			Single-seat motorglider
Ekolot JK-05L Junior			Two-seat ultralight aircraft
Ekolot KR-030 Topaz			Two-seat ultralight aircraft
Ekolot KR-010 Elf			Single-seat motorglider
