= Paradise Aircraft =

Brazilian aircraft manufacturer

Paradise Industria Aeronautica Ltda
- Company type: Privately held company
- Industry: Aerospace
- Founded: 2001
- Headquarters: Feira de Santana, Brazil
- Products: Light-sport aircraft
- Website: www.paradise-ultraleve.com

Paradise Industria Aeronautica Ltda is a Brazilian aircraft manufacturer based in Feira de Santana, Bahia State, founded in 2001. The company specializes in the design and manufacture of light aircraft in the form of ready-to-fly aircraft for the American light-sport aircraft category.

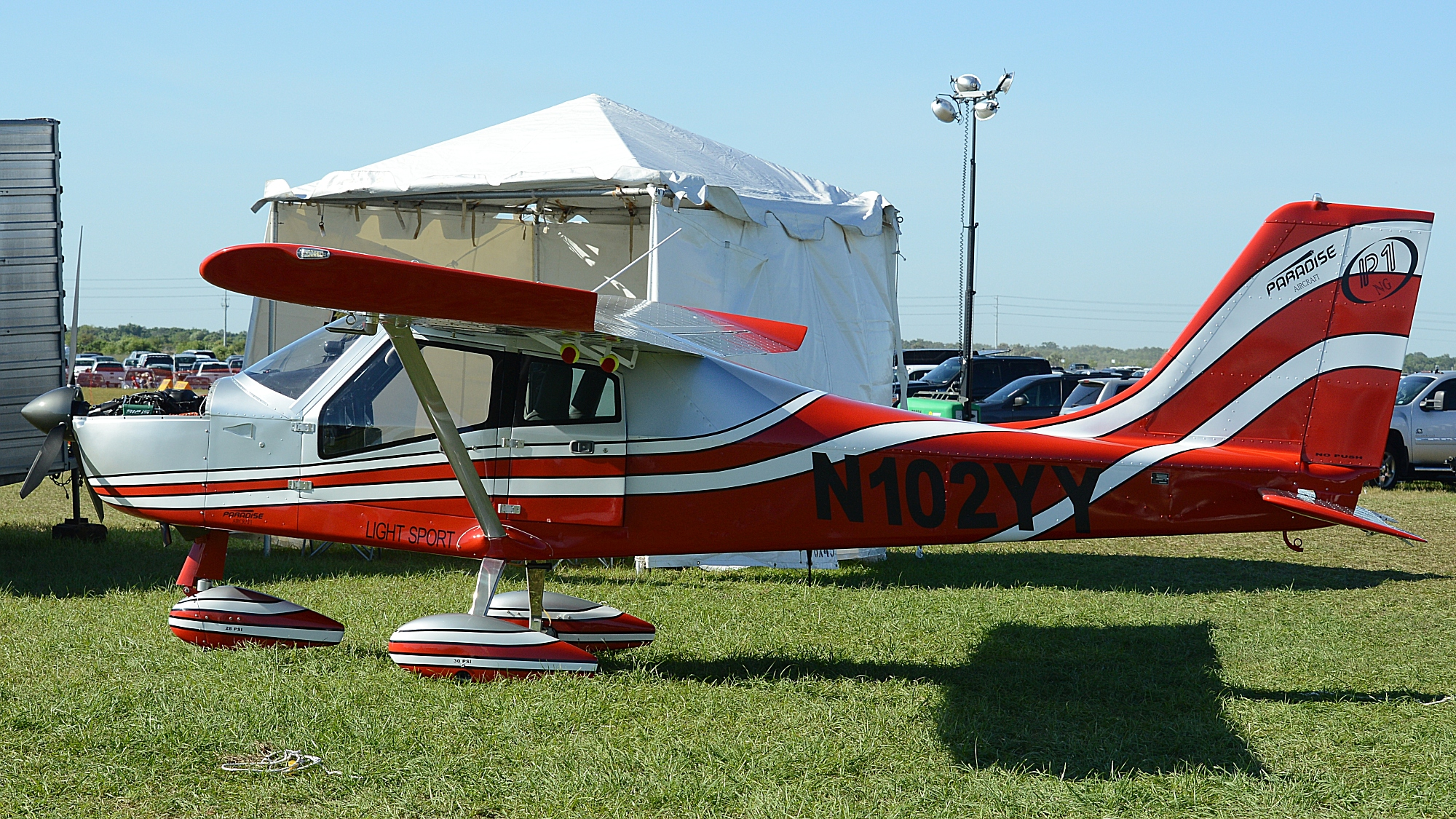
Paradise P-1 LSA

The company's first aircraft design, the Paradise P-1 LSA is a two-seat light-sport aircraft for the American market. The aircraft was accepted by the Federal Aviation Administration as an SLSA and by January 2015 ten had been sold in the US.

The company has further developed the P-1 design into the P-1NG, the P-2 and the four-seat P-4. The company works in steel tubing, covered with aluminium sheet

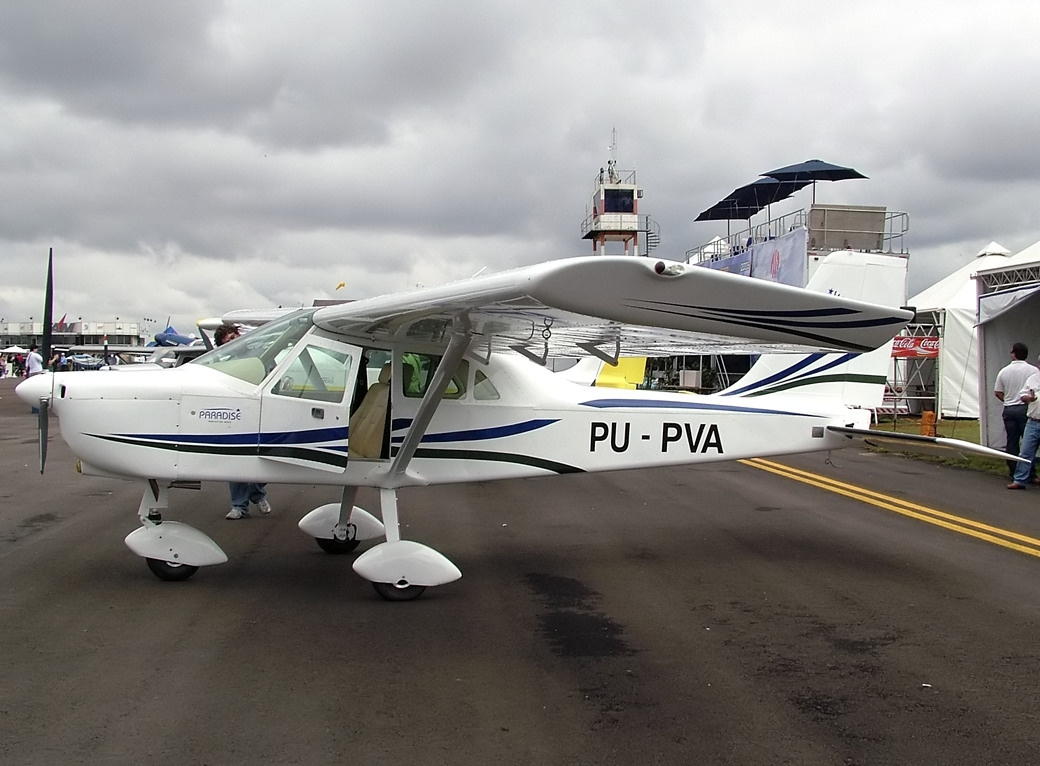
A P-4

The company initially set up a production facility in the United States, in Sebring, Florida to serve that market, but it was later closed. By 2015 the company had no representation in the US.

== Aircraft ==
Summary of aircraft built by Paradise
Model name	First flight	Number built	Type
Paradise P-1 LSA	2008		Two seat high-wing light-sport aircraft
Paradise P-2			Two seat high-wing light-sport aircraft
Paradise P-4			Four seat high-wing aircraft
Paradise Eagle			Two seat low-wing light-sport aircraft
