= Sport Hornet LRS =

General information
- Type: Personal use and flight training aircraft
- Manufacturer: Higher Class Aviation
- Designer: Jim Millet

History
- First flight: 1992

The Sport Hornet LRS is a Light Sport Aircraft. One unique attribute that sets the Sport Hornet LRS apart from other LSA Aircraft is the air spring suspension system on the landing gear. This protects the aircraft from damage in the event of "miscalculated" landings and allows for a better experience for the pilot and passengers.

The company and website appear to be defunct.

== Specifications ==
Data from Sport Hornet

General characteristics

- Crew: one pilot
- Capacity: one passenger 540 lb (245 kg) useful load (option dependent)
- Length: 21 ft 6 in (6.55 m)
- Wingspan: 30 ft 0 in (9.14 m)
- Height: 9 ft 0 in (2.74 m)
- Wing area: 155 sq ft (14.4 m^{2})
- Airfoil: Eiffel 370
- Empty weight: 680 lb (308 kg)
- Max takeoff weight: 1,320 lb (600 kg)
- Powerplant: 1 × Rotax 912 ULS IVO Medium 3, 100 hp (74.6 kW)

Performance

- Maximum speed: 120 kn (138 mph, 222 km/h)
- Cruise speed: 100 kn (115 mph, 185 km/h)
- Stall speed: 35 kn (40 mph, 64 km/h)
- Never exceed speed: 120 kn (138 mph, 222 km/h)
- Range: 440 nmi (620 mi, 1,000 km)
- Service ceiling: 10,000 ft (3,050 m)
- Rate of climb: 1,000 ft/min (5.1 m/s)
