= Ekolot JK-05L Junior =

Polish ultralight aircraft

JK-05L Junior
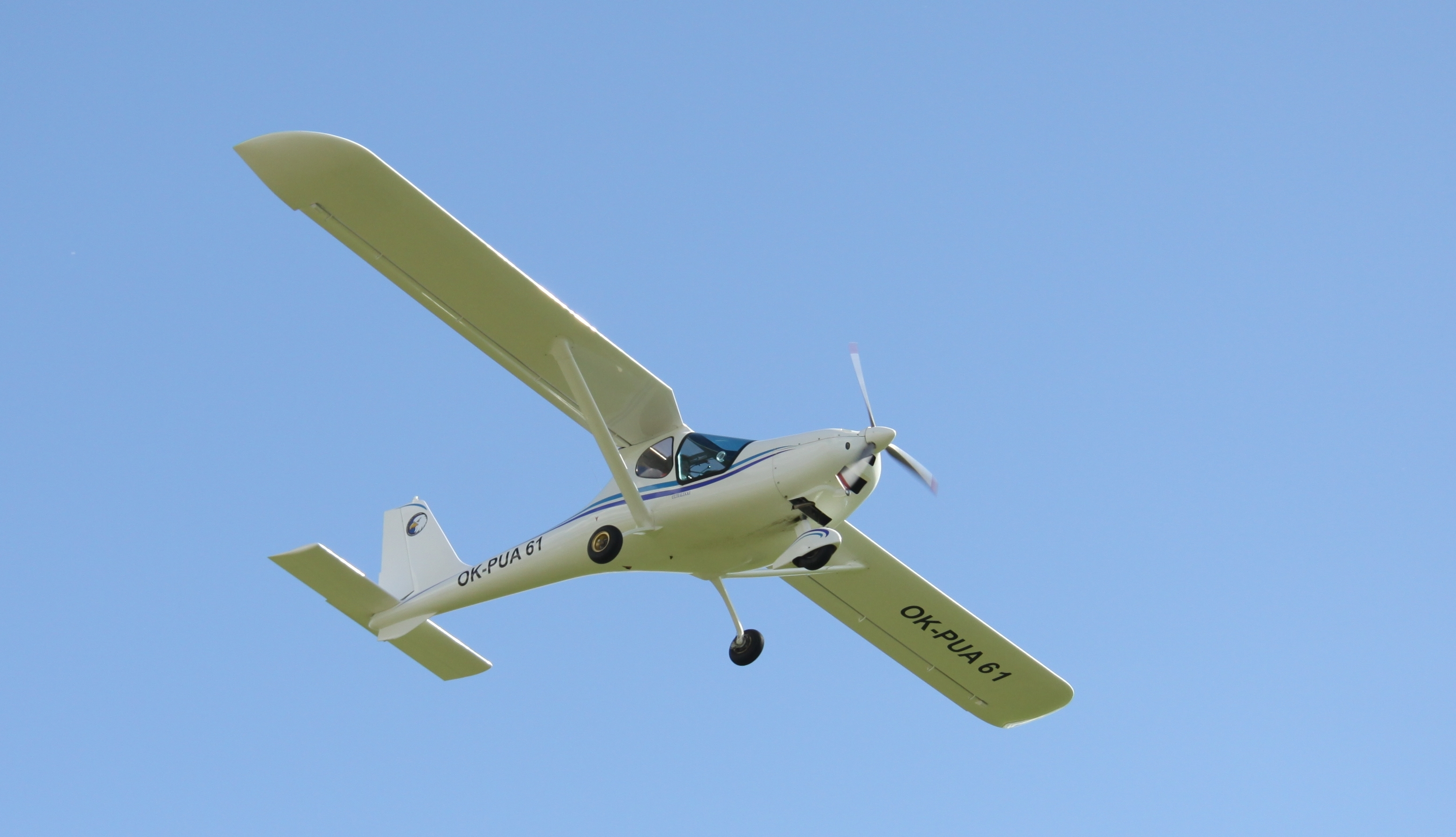

General information
- Type: Ultralight aircraft
- National origin: Poland
- Manufacturer: Ekolot
- Status: In production

History
- Variant: Ekolot KR-030 Topaz

The Ekolot JK-05L Junior is a Polish ultralight aircraft, designed and produced by Ekolot of Krosno. It was certified in Poland in February 2010. The aircraft is supplied as a kit for amateur construction or as a complete ready-to-fly aircraft.

== Design and development ==
The JK-05L was designed to comply with the Fédération Aéronautique Internationale microlight rules. It features a strut-braced high wing, an enclosed cockpit with two seats in side-by-side configuration, fixed tricycle landing gear and a single engine in tractor configuration.

The aircraft is made from composites. Its 10.68 m (35.0 ft) span wing employs an NN-1817 airfoil, has an area of 10.24 m^{2} (110.2 sq ft) and employs carbon fibre flaperons. The twin 35 litres (7.7 imp gal; 9.2 US gal) fuel tanks are located behind the seats. A ballistic parachute is available. The controls include a single, centrally mounted centre stick and electric trim. The standard engine is the 80 hp (60 kW) Rotax 912UL four-stroke powerplant.

The JK-05L was later developed into the Ekolot KR-030 Topaz.

== Specifications (JK-05L Junior) ==
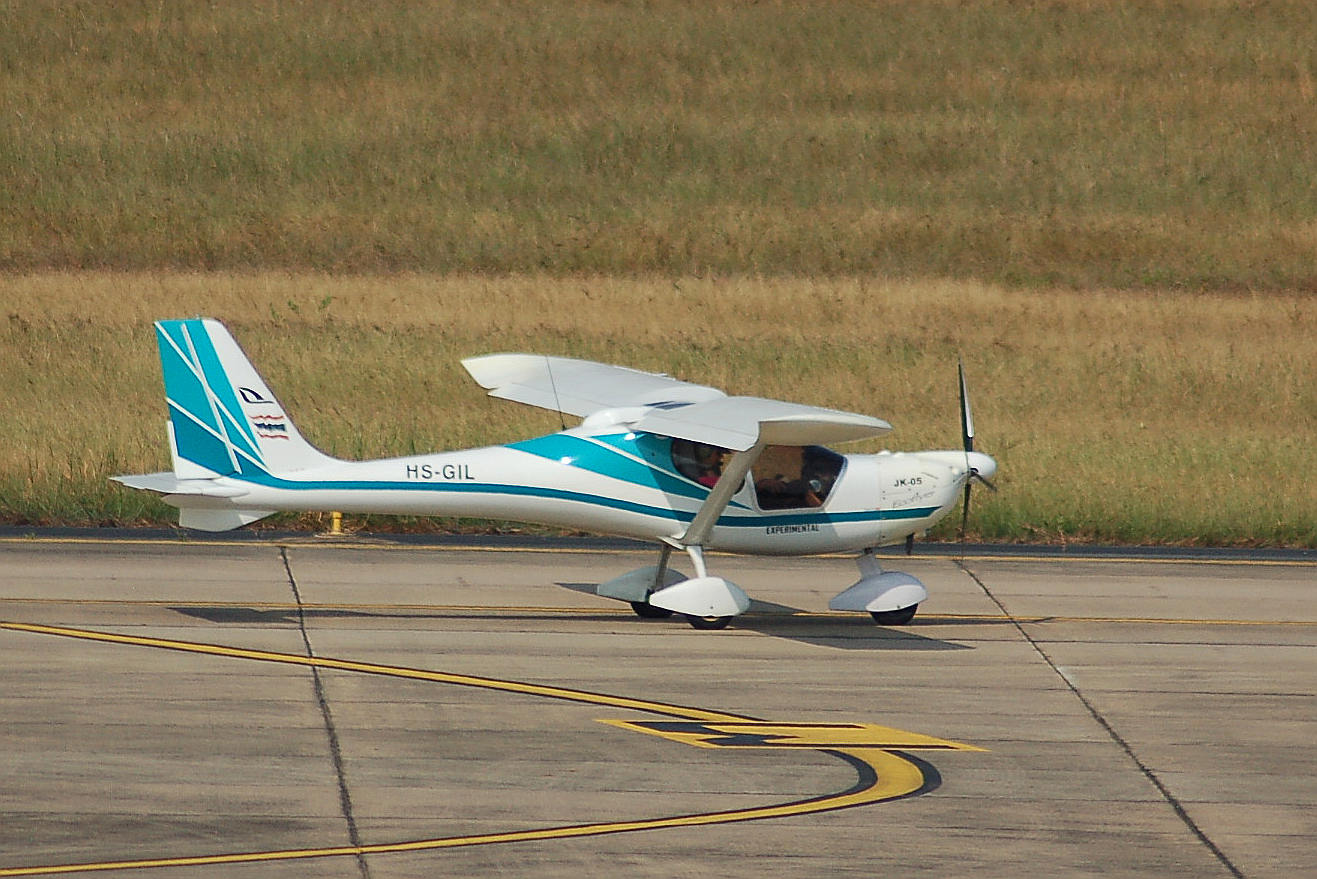
Ekolot JK-05L Junior

Data from Ekolot

General characteristics

- Crew: one
- Capacity: one passenger
- Length: 5.7 m (18 ft 8 in)
- Wingspan: 10.76 m (35 ft 4 in)
- Height: 2.25 m (7 ft 5 in)
- Wing area: 10.2 m^{2} (110 sq ft)
- Airfoil: NN-1817
- Empty weight: 290 kg (639 lb)
- Gross weight: 450 kg (992 lb)
- Fuel capacity: 70 litres (15 imp gal; 18 US gal)
- Powerplant: 1 × Rotax 912UL four cylinder, liquid and air-cooled, four stroke aircraft engine, 60 kW (80 hp)

Performance

- Maximum speed: 200 km/h (120 mph, 110 kn)
- Cruise speed: 180 km/h (110 mph, 97 kn) at 75% power
- Stall speed: 55 km/h (34 mph, 30 kn) flaps down
- Range: 1,000 km (620 mi, 540 nmi)
- Rate of climb: 6 m/s (1,200 ft/min)
- Wing loading: 41 kg/m^{2} (8.4 lb/sq ft)
