= Czech Sport Aircraft =

Czech aircraft manufacturer

- Industry: Aerospace
- Founded: 2009
- Headquarters: Kunovice, Czech Republic
- Products: Light aircraft
- Website: www.cruiseraircraft.cz

Czech Sport Aircraft, a.s. (successor of Czech Aircraft Works) is an aircraft manufacturer based in the Czech Republic. Czech Sport Aircraft company formally entered the market in 2009.

In 2011 the company's aircraft line included the amphibious Mermaid, the SportCruiser and the streamlined Parrot, but from 2012 only the SportCruiser and PS-28 Cruiser have been produced. In June 2017 produced its 600th aircraft.

CZAW manufactured Zenair's Zenith STOL CH701 aircraft under license until the agreement was concluded in December 2006.

== History ==
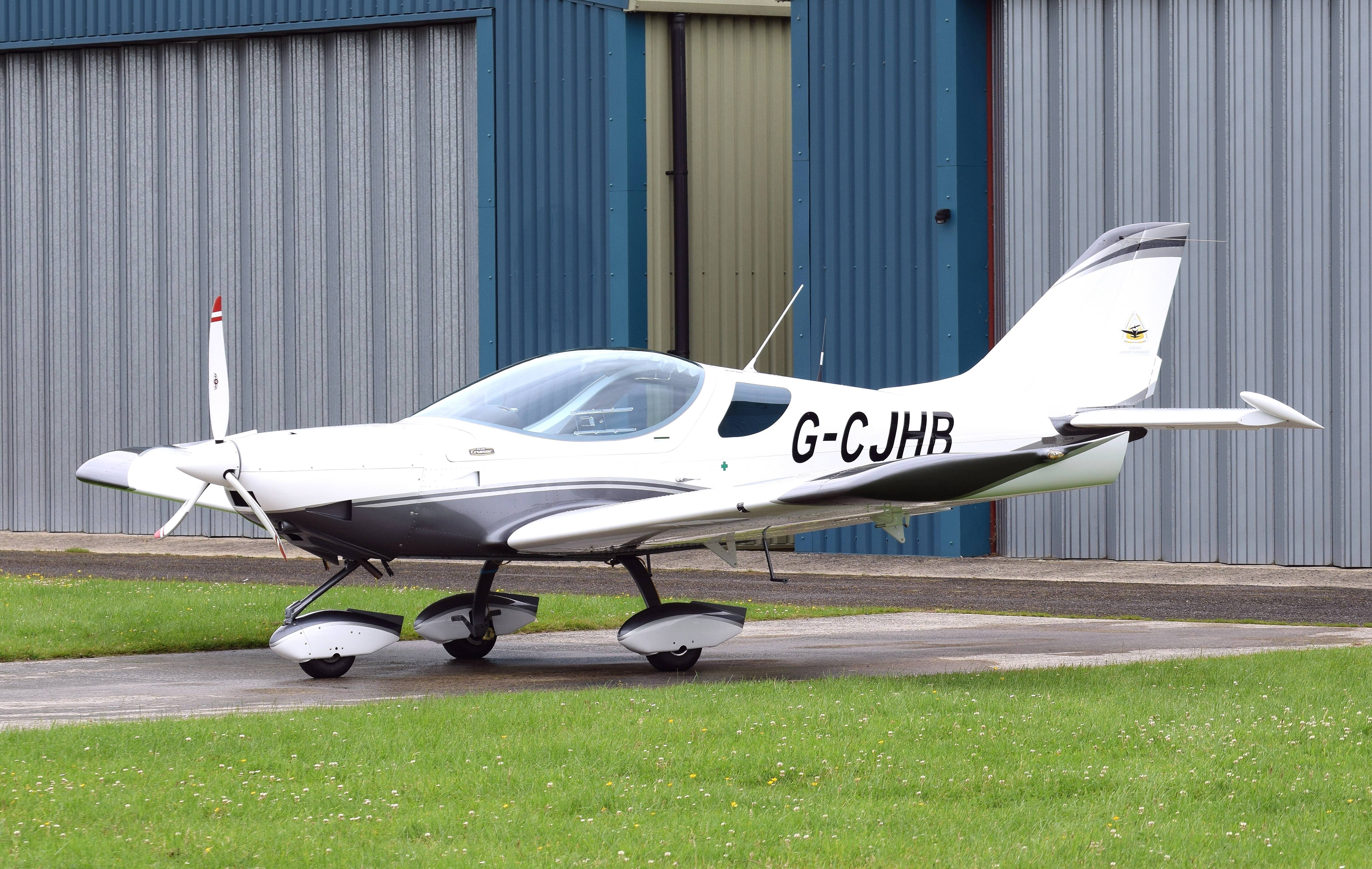
Czech Sport Aircraft PS-28 Cruiser at Cotswold Airport, Gloucestershire, England, 2016

In 2009 the Regional Court in Brno, Czech Republic declared the CZAW company bankrupt. The successor company entered the market at the same year under the name Czech Sport Aircraft.

In January 2010, the company's SportCruiser aircraft was added to the Piper Aircraft line as the PiperSport under a licensing agreement. The stated plan was that CSA would still produce the aircraft and Piper would market it worldwide, as well as supply parts to customers. In January 2011, the licensing agreement with Piper was abruptly ended with Piper CEO Geoffrey Berger saying "the company has a different business perspective and approach to the market than Czech Sport Aircraft". The PiperSport distributors then formed a dealer association to ensure the continued sales of the SportCruiser and support of both the SportCruiser and PiperSport in the US.

In 2016 the SportCruiser was the best seller aircraft in SLSA category in USA.

== Aircraft ==
- Mermaid
- Parrot
- PS-10 Tourer
- PS-28 Cruiser
- PS-38 Tourer
- SportCruiser

== See also ==
- Light aircraft manufacturers in the Czech Republic
