= Progressive Aerodyne =

American homebuilt aircraft manufacturer

Progressive Aerodyne, Inc
- Type: Privately held company
- Industry: Aerospace
- Founded: 1991
- Founder: Kerry Richter; Wayne Richter; Paige Lynette
- Defunct: 2024
- Headquarters: Tavares, Florida, United States
- Key people: CEO: Geoffrey Nicholson
- Products: Kit aircraft
- Website: www.searey.com

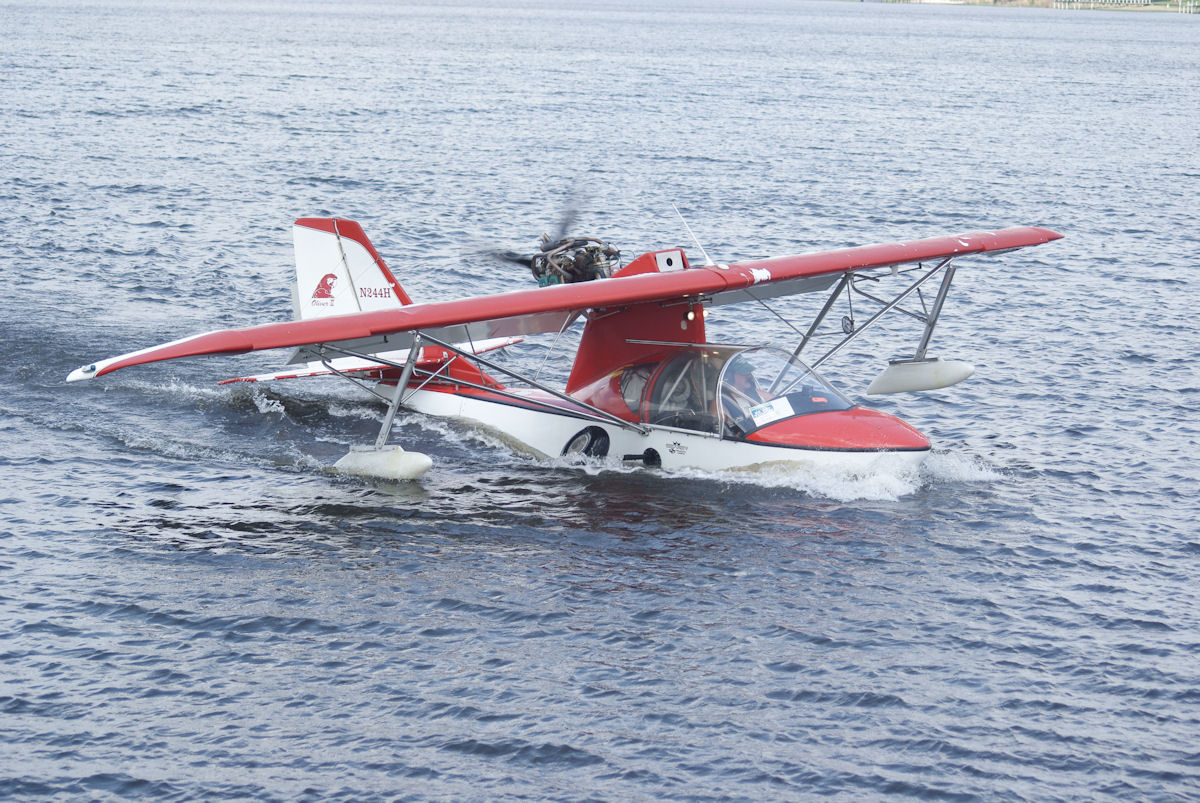
Progressive Aerodyne SeaRey

Progressive Aerodyne, Inc was a Chinese owned aircraft manufacturer with production based in Tavares, Florida. The company specialized in the design and manufacture of amphibious kit aircraft for the amateur-construction market.

== History ==
The company was founded in 1991 in Orlando, Florida by Kerry Richter, Wayne Richter and Paige Lynette. The company moved to Tavares, Florida in May 2010, naming Adam Yang as CEO. In 2013, Adam Yang was replaced by Geoffrey Nicholson.

The company's main product, the SeaRey, was first flown in November 1992.

The company opened a Shanghai, China, office in 2014, and was bought by Chinese investors in 2016.

The company shut down in early 2024.

== Aircraft ==
Aircraft built by Progressive Aerodyne
Model name	First flight	Number built	Type
SeaRey	1992	480 (2011)	two-seat amphibious kit aircraft
Stingray	1990s	at least nine	single-seat amphibious kit aircraft
