= Ekolot JK 01A Elf =

Polish motorglider

JK 01A Elf
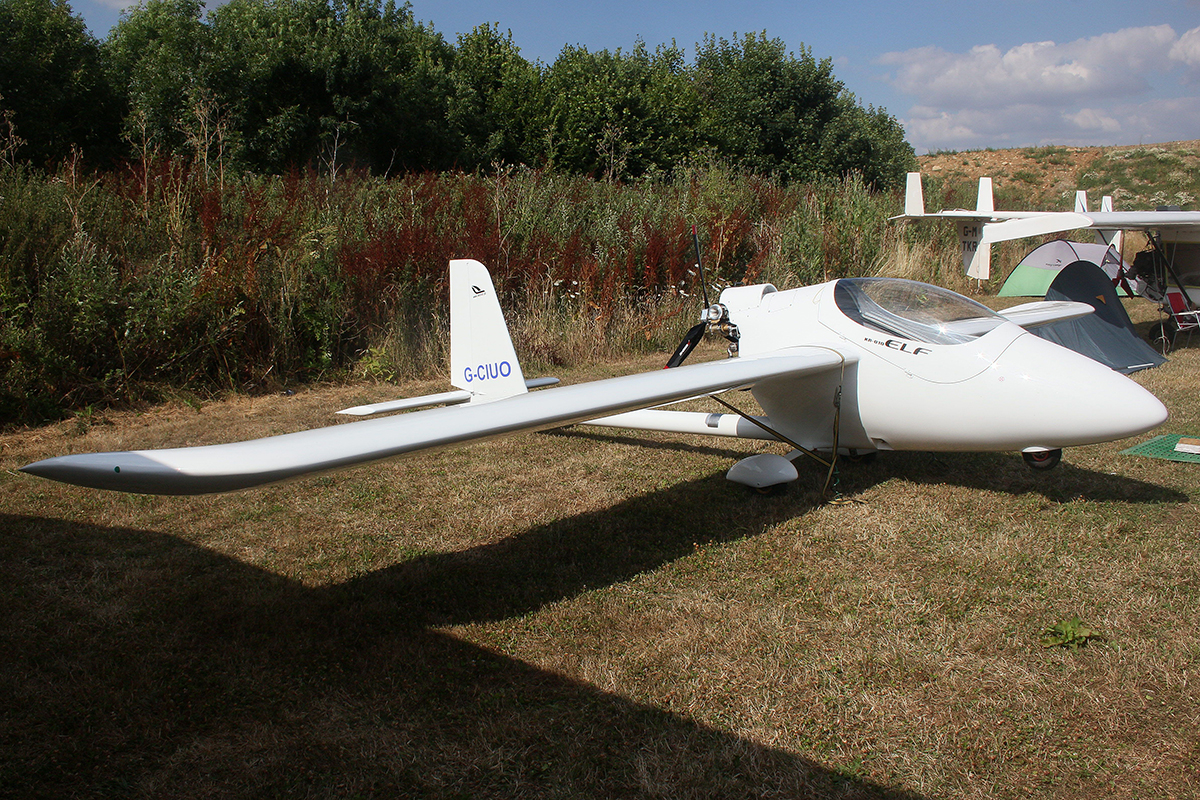

General information
- Type: Motor glider
- National origin: Poland
- Manufacturer: Ekolot
- Designer: Jerzy Krawczyk
- Status: Production completed

History
- First flight: 8 July 2006
- Developed into: Ekolot KR-010 Elf

The Ekolot JK 01A Elf is a Polish mid-wing, single-seat motor glider, designed by Jerzy Krawczyk and produced by Ekolot of Krosno. Production has ended, but when it was available it was provided as a complete ready-to-fly aircraft or as a kit for amateur construction. It was superseded in production by the improved Ekolot KR-010 Elf.

== Design and development ==
The JK 01A Elf was designed by Krawczyk, based on the earlier work of American designer Alex Strojnikun. It features cantilever wings, a single-seat enclosed cockpit under a bubble canopy, fixed landing gear and a single engine in pusher configuration.

The aircraft is made from composites. Its 11.12 m (36.5 ft) span wing has an area of 10.80 m^{2} (116.3 sq ft), flaperons and provides a glide ratio of 26:1. The standard engine used was a 20 hp (15 kW) JPX D-320 two-stroke, but this engine is no longer available and any small horizontally-opposed engine in the 20 hp (15 kW) range can be used. An engine of this power provides a takeoff run of 150 m (492.1 ft). The propeller used has a folding design to reduce drag and the fuel tank fitted has a volume of 15 litres (3.3 imp gal; 4.0 US gal). The landing gear uses dual, close-set mainwheels and a smaller nosewheel, with no wingtip wheels.

The company provides complete ready-to-fly aircraft and kits which offer the aircraft in various states of completion.

The first flight was made on 8 July 2006. There is no evidence of production beyond 2007/8.

== Specifications (JK 01A Elf) ==
Data from World Directory of Leisure Aviation 2011-12 and Ekolot

General characteristics

- Crew: one
- Length: 5.65 m (18 ft 6 in)
- Wingspan: 11.12 m (36 ft 6 in)
- Height: 1.92 m (6 ft 4 in)
- Wing area: 10.80 m^{2} (116.3 sq ft)
- Empty weight: 115 kg (254 lb) including ballistic parachute
- Max takeoff weight: 230 kg (507 lb)
- Fuel capacity: 15 litres (3.3 imp gal; 4.0 US gal)
- Powerplant: 1 × JPX D-330 two cylinder, air-cooled, two stroke aircraft engine, 15 kW (20 hp)
- Propellers: 2-bladed folding composite

Performance

- Maximum speed: 125 km/h (78 mph, 67 kn)
- Cruise speed: 110 km/h (68 mph, 59 kn)
- Stall speed: 42 km/h (26 mph, 23 kn)
- Maximum glide ratio: 26:1
- Rate of climb: 2.5 m/s (490 ft/min)
- Rate of sink: 0.6 m/s (120 ft/min)
- Wing loading: 21.3 kg/m^{2} (4.4 lb/sq ft)

== See also ==
- Ekolot KR-010 Elf
- List of gliders
