= Zavereshytsia =

Rural locality in Lviv Oblast, Ukraine

Zavereshytsia Заверешиця
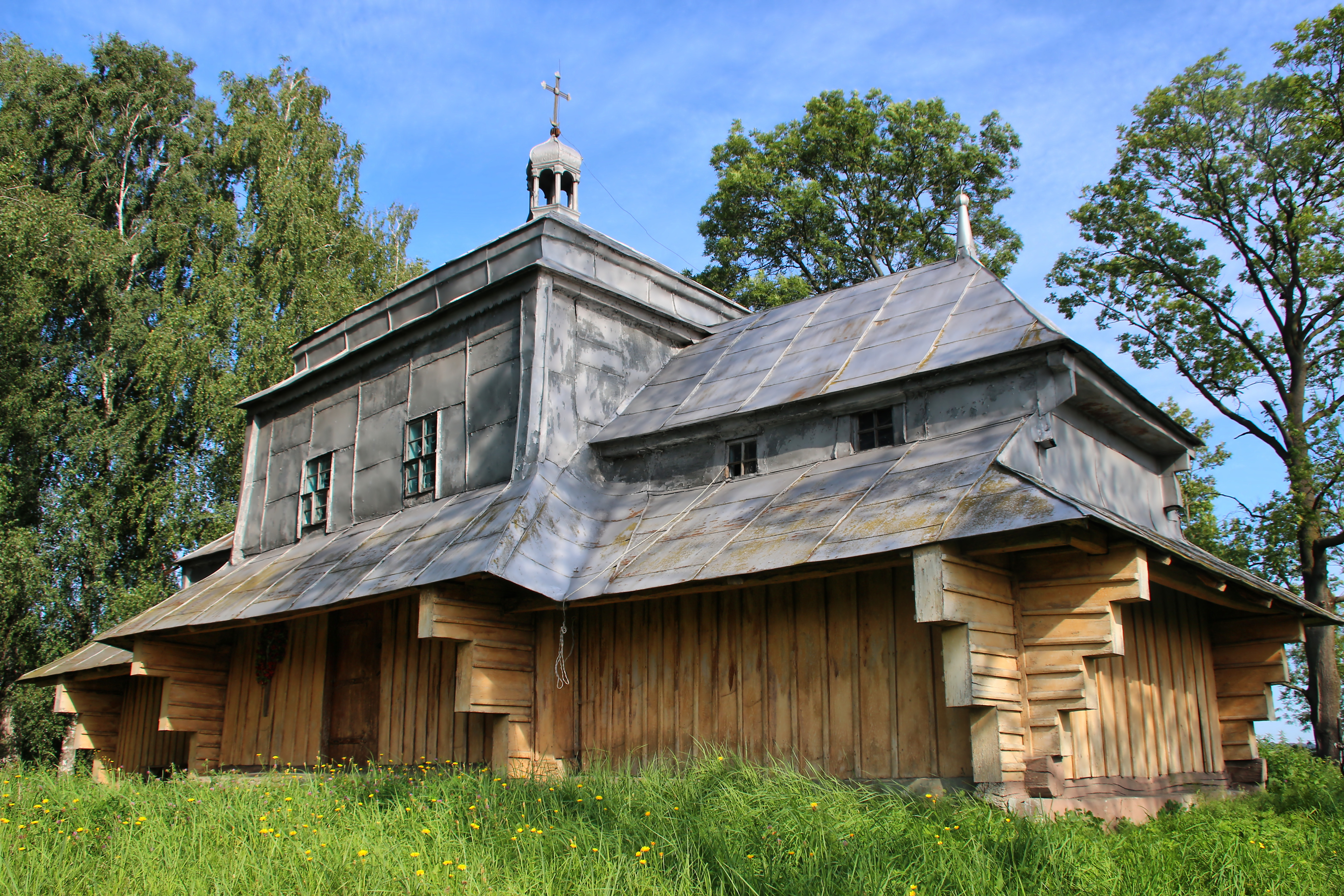
- Wooden church

- Location in Lviv Oblast Zavereshytsia (Ukraine)
- Coordinates: 49°50′22″N 23°41′34″E
- Country: Ukraine
- Oblast: Lviv Oblast
- Raion: Lviv Raion
- Hromada: Horodok urban hromada
- Time zone: UTC+2 (EET)
  - Summer (DST): UTC+3 (EEST)
- Postal code: 81511

Zavereshytsia (Ukrainian: Заверешиця; until 1946, the Tsuniv) is a village in the Horodok urban hromada of the Lviv Raion of Lviv Oblast in Ukraine.

== History ==
On 19 July 2020, as a result of the administrative-territorial reform and liquidation of the Horodok Raion, the village became part of the Lviv Raion.

== Religion ==
- Church of the Presentation of Virgin Mary (wooden, 1693)

== Notable residents ==
- Ivan Klymko (1930—2007), Ukrainian ceramist, painter
- Ivan Pavlyshyn (1994—2022), Ukrainian soldier, Hero of Ukraine

== Sources ==
- "Czuniów". Geographical Dictionary of the Kingdom of Poland (in Polish). 1. Warszawa: Kasa im. Józefa Mianowskiego. 1880. p. 881.
