= Ekolot KR-010 Elf =

Polish single-seat motor glider

KR-010 Elf

General information
- Type: Motor glider
- National origin: Poland
- Manufacturer: Ekolot
- Designer: Jerzy Krawczyk

History
- Developed from: Ekolot JK 01A Elf

The Ekolot KR-010 Elf is a Polish mid-wing, single-seat motor glider, produced by Ekolot of Krosno. It is the successor to the Ekolot JK 01A Elf. It was designed by Jerzy Krawczyk. It employs flaperons.

== Specifications (KR-010 Elf) ==
Data from Ekolot

General characteristics

- Crew: one
- Length: 5.95 m (19 ft 6 in)
- Wingspan: 10.58 m (34 ft 9 in)
- Height: 2.3 m (7 ft 7 in)
- Wing area: 10.1 m^{2} (109 sq ft)
- Empty weight: 305 kg (672 lb) including ballistic parachute
- Max takeoff weight: 472.5 kg (1,042 lb)
- Fuel capacity: 86l
- Powerplant: 1 × 2T Tornado 280 , 24 kW (32 hp)

Performance

- Maximum speed: 210 km/h (130 mph, 110 kn)
- Cruise speed: 189 km/h (117 mph, 102 kn)
- Stall speed: 65 km/h (40 mph, 35 kn)
- Never exceed speed: 240 km/h (150 mph, 130 kn)
- Maximum glide ratio: 26:1
- Rate of climb: 6 m/s (1,200 ft/min)

== See also ==
- List of gliders
