= CZAW SportCruiser =

Czech light-sport aircraft

SportCruiser
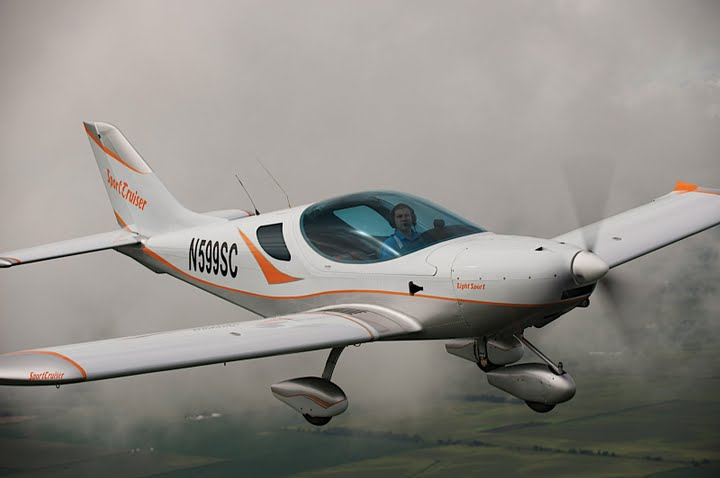
- SportCruiser

General information
- Type: Ultralight aircraft Light sport aircraft
- Manufacturer: Czech Aircraft Works; Czech Sport Aircraft
- Designer: Jiří Konečný
- Number built: 400+

History
- Manufactured: 2006–present
- Introduction date: 2006
- First flight: 22 Dec 2005

The CSA SportCruiser is a two-seat, single engine, tricycle undercarriage, fixed-wing aircraft that was introduced in 2006 by Czech Aircraft Works (CZAW), now named Czech Sport Aircraft.

In January 2010, the SportCruiser was added to the Piper Aircraft line as the PiperSport under a licensing agreement with Czech Sport Aircraft. This arrangement was terminated one year later in January 2011.

== Design and development ==
The aircraft is of all aluminum construction with a low wing configuration. It can be fitted with either a 100 hp (75 kW) Rotax 912ULS or a 120 hp (89 kW) Jabiru 3300 engine. Approved propellers include the Woodcomp Klassic 170/3/R.

The SportCruiser has an optional Ballistic Recovery Systems parachute, auto pilot and Dynon or TruTrak EFIS.

The aircraft is capable of cruising at 214 km/h (133 mph; 116 kn) with a range of 1,014 km (630 mi). No wind, standard day gross weight takeoff is achieved in 106 m (348 ft) and landing in 123 m (404 ft).

The SportCruiser is designed to fit into the ultralight or microlight category in several countries as well as in the light-sport aircraft category in the United States. Between 2006 and 2010, it was available either as a kit or as a fully built production model. The SportCruiser is accepted as a US FAA LSA, FAA homebuilt kit and the UK under BCAR Section "S".

== PiperSport ==
On 21 January 2010, Piper Aircraft announced that they had licensed a derivative of the SportCruiser and would market it as the PiperSport. Piper CEO Kevin Gould said: "The PiperSport is an amazing entry-level aircraft that will bring new customers into Piper and lead the way for those customers to step up into more sophisticated and higher performance aircraft within our line over time."

The PiperSport is a minimally modified version of the existing SportCruiser. The plan was that it would continue to be manufactured by Czech Sport Aircraft, with Piper's manufacturing operation playing no part in the construction, although Piper was distributing parts. The changes to the aircraft are stronger nosegear, a Ballistic Recovery Systems parachute and leather interior both as standard equipment, a cockpit sunshade and modified pitch controls, plus a custom paint scheme. Previously the Sport Cruiser was available as a completed aircraft or a kit, but Piper offered it only as a completed aircraft, sold as a Special Light-sport aircraft in the US. It was distributed by the Piper dealer network worldwide. Deliveries under the Piper name commenced with the initial customer receiving their aircraft on 13 April 2010 at Sun 'n Fun. The aircraft was offered in three different trim and avionics configurations, with higher end models offering the Dynon Avionics D100 glass cockpit and autopilot. All models were delivered with the Rotax 912S powerplant of 100 hp (75 kW).

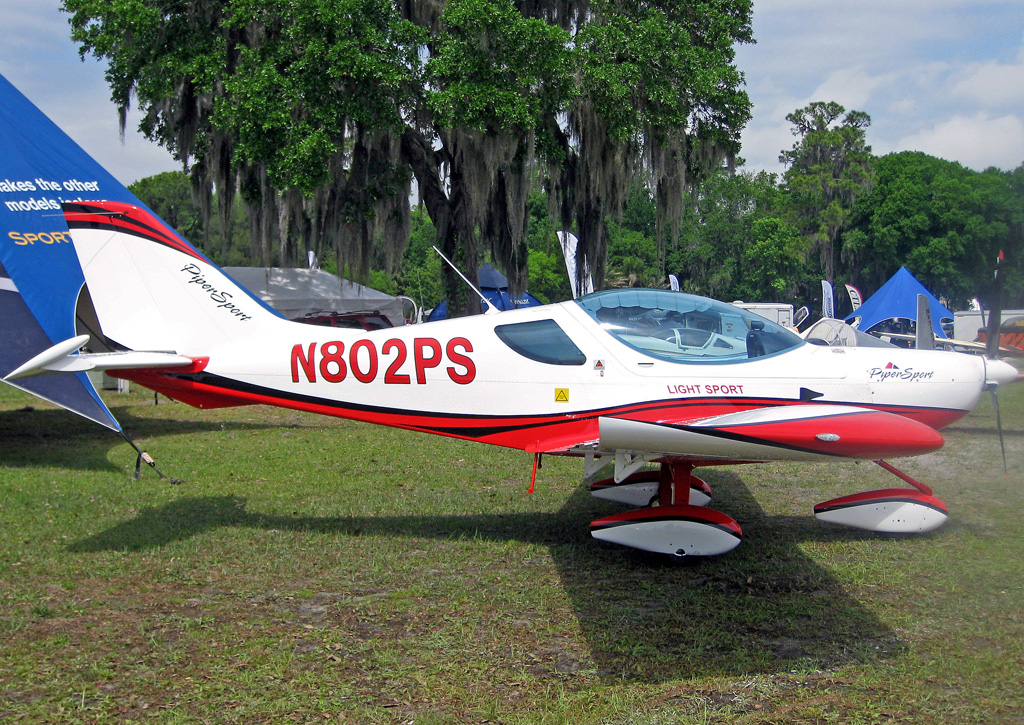
PiperSport LSA aircraft exhibited at the 2011 Sun 'n Fun show at Lakeland Linder International Airport Florida

Piper indicated that they had carried out extensive test flying on the SportCruiser before agreeing to add it to their line and that the aircraft's slow sales in the past had been related to marketing issues and not any deficiencies with the aircraft design. Piper planned to market the aircraft to flight schools as well as private owners.

In analyzing the Piper decision to distribute the SportCruiser, instead of design its own LSA, AvWeb analyst Paul Bertorelli said:

I heard a little kvetching about the Piper decision, to the effect of asking why they're going with the Sport Cruiser instead of developing their own airplane. To me, the answer is obvious: It makes no business sense for Piper to develop and build its own LSA. In the Piper Cub days, they were everyman's airplane company—as Cessna is now—but they're not that today. Piper is a niche manufacturer which has sustained itself with a small volume of a relatively broad model line. So it makes sense for them to buy an existing design out of the still-glutted LSA market. Whether the Sport Cruiser is the right choice remains to be seen.

On 12 January 2011, after selling a total of 45 aircraft, Piper announced that the PiperSport would be discontinued. Piper CEO Geoffrey Berger stated:

After a year working with Czech Sport Aircraft, Piper determined that it is in our company’s best long-term interests to discontinue the business relationship which distributed a Light Sport Aircraft manufactured by the Czech company and distributed under Piper’s brand by a separate distributor network. Clearly, the company has a different business perspective and approach to the market than Czech Sport Aircraft.

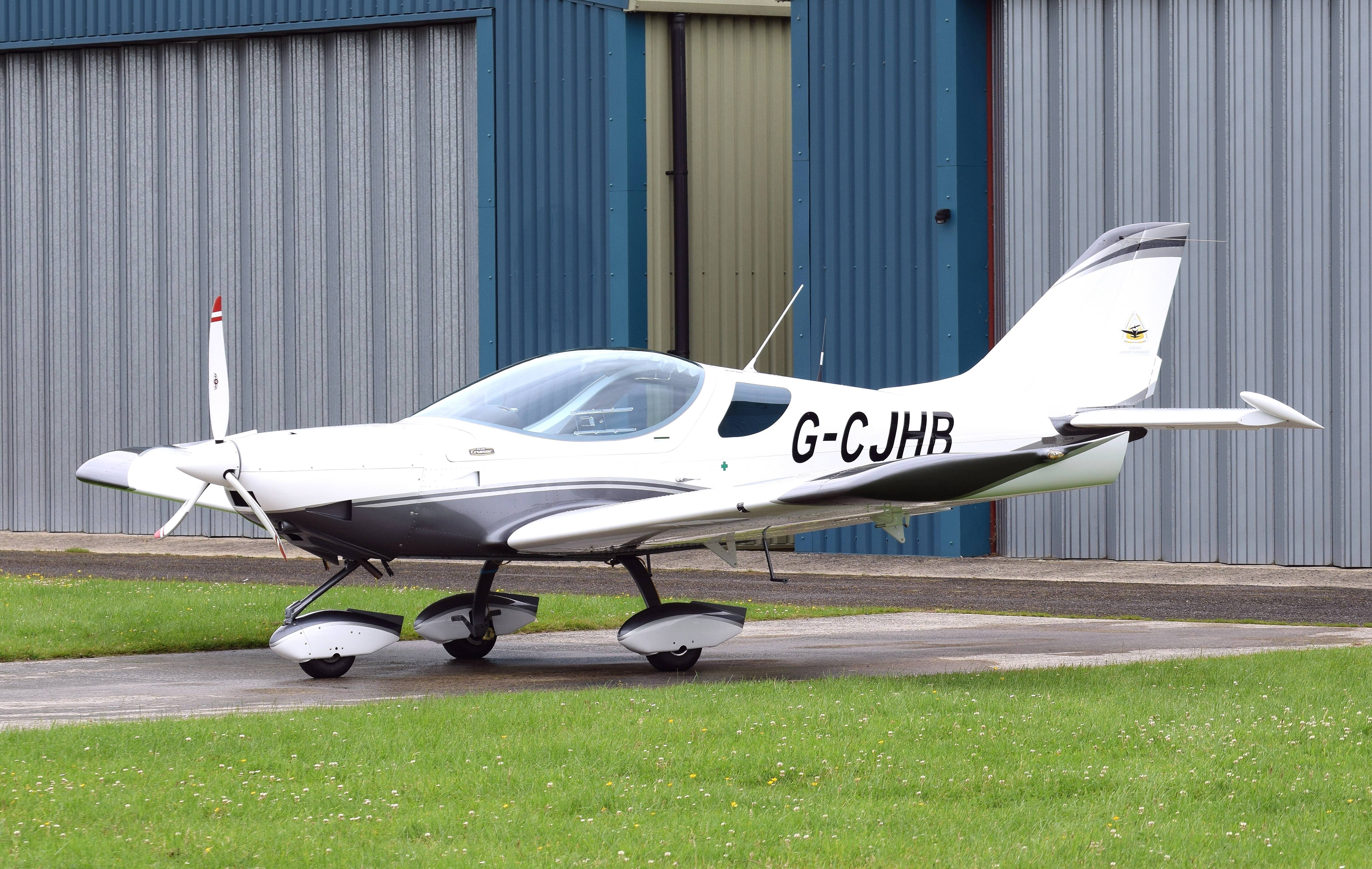
PS-28 Cruiser at Cotswold Airport, Gloucestershire, England, 2016

After the Piper announcement the PiperSport importer and dealer network indicated that the aircraft would continue to be imported under a new name. Importer U.S. Sport Aircraft CEO Don Ayres stated that said his company was engaged in "business as usual...aircraft will continue to be sold and supported".

The aviation press reacted with skepticism as to Piper's explanation for terminating its arrangements with CSA. AvWeb editor Paul Bertorelli said, "In my view, we are not getting the full story on its decision to exit the LSA segment. In a tersely worded statement a week before the show, Piper said it was terminating its relationship with the Czech supplier of its PiperSport LSA, citing 'differences in business philosophies.' That phrase is code speak for a significant behind-the-scenes blowup. In my opinion, either Piper concluded the margins on LSAs weren't worth the trouble and it would rather focus on jets or its Czech supplier was doing something it didn't like. Or both."

Czech Sport Aircraft reacted to the ending of the Piper deal by indicating that business would continue through the same distributor and dealer network and that the name of the aircraft would be changed back to SportCruiser. The company did indicate that the disagreement with Piper involved the geographical focus that Piper had put on marketing in the US to the detriment of the rest of the world. The company indicated that it will continue to develop the aircraft and planned revisions to the spinner, canopy, elevator, ailerons and wingtips in the immediate future.

== Variants ==
SportCruiser
Version built 2006–10 and 2011–present by Czech Sport Aircraft, available as a kit or completed aircraft and equipped with 100 hp (75 kW) Rotax 912ULS or 120 hp (89 kW) Jabiru 3300 engine.
PiperSport
Version built 2010–2011 by Czech Sport Aircraft and marketed by Piper Aircraft, available only as a completed aircraft and equipped with 100 hp (75 kW) Rotax 912ULS engine. Discontinued in January 2011.
PS-28 Cruiser
Version built for EASA CS.LSA certification with 600kg gross weight limit.

== Operators ==
The SportCruiser is operated by private individuals and flight training schools.

== Specifications (SportCruiser) ==
CZAW SportCruiser

Data from Manufacturer

General characteristics

- Crew: one
- Capacity: one passenger
- Length: 6.62 m (21 ft 9 in)
- Wingspan: 8.6 m (28 ft 3 in)
- Height: 2.315 m (7 ft 7 in)
- Wing area: 12.3 m^{2} (132 sq ft)
- Empty weight: 388 kg (855 lb)
- Gross weight: 600 kg (1,323 lb)
- Fuel capacity: 114 litres (25 imp gal; 30 US gal)
- Powerplant: 1 × Rotax 912 ULS2 , 73.5 kW (98.6 hp)
- Propellers: 3-bladed Woodcomp Klassic 170/3/R

Performance

- Maximum speed: 220 km/h (140 mph, 120 kn)
- Cruise speed: 172 km/h (107 mph, 93 kn) 75% power at 3000 ft
- Stall speed: 55 km/h (34 mph, 30 kn)
- Never exceed speed: 255 km/h (158 mph, 138 kn)
- Range: 953 km (592 mi, 515 nmi) with 30 minute reserve
- Endurance: 5:25
- Rate of climb: 4.2 m/s (830 ft/min)

== See also ==
Aircraft of comparable role, configuration, and era

- Arion Aircraft Lightning LS-1
- Aero AT-3
- BRM Aero Bristell
- Tecnam P2002
- Europa XS Trigear
- Cessna 162
- Flight Design CTSW
- Rans S-19 Venterra
- Van's Aircraft RV-12
