= Aircraft industry of Serbia =

Kingdom of Serbia became part of the new state, Kingdom of the Serbs, Croats and Slovenes. which was formed on 1 December 1918. Even though the industry was on a very low level of development, the state was among the first 10 countries in the world which developed their own aircraft production. Originally, only the parts produced in foreign factories were assembled, but very soon the production of domestic components began, so as the engineering. The forerunner of the domestic aircraft industry was the Airplane workshop (Aeroplanska radionica), which was established in 1920, at the airfield in Novi Sad. The assembling of the trial series of Hansa-Brandenburg C.I. The series was named SBr, as this type of plane was known in Serbia as srednji Brandenburg ("middle Brandenburg").

From 1923 to 1941, there were 7 aircraft factories in Serbia, 4 of which were located in the capital, Belgrade, and 2 airplane engines factories. Also, some planes were produced in the aircraft workshops, aero clubs and private workshops. There were also factories for the aircraft equipment and workshops for the repairs and overhauls of the aircraft, engines and components. A major boost to the industry was a decision by the state from 1926 to acquire over 800 fighters and several hundreds of trainers and school planes. Additional foreign licenses were obtained. The advance of the industry was halted in 1932 when the state stopped with the further acquirement of the aircraft due to the Great Depression. The production rebound from 1937 onwards.

According to the State union of the aircraft industries of the Kingdom of Yugoslavia, the state's aircraft industry and the auxiliary industries employed 300 engineers and technicians, 500 employees and 6,000 workers. In total, 1,729 military and civilian aircraft were produced in Serbia between two World Wars. Of those, none were cargo or reconnaissance aircraft. One of the most important people in the technical development of the aircraft design was engineer Milenko D. Mitrović "Spirta" (1905–1986), who developed numerous designs for the airplanes in the 1928-40 period.

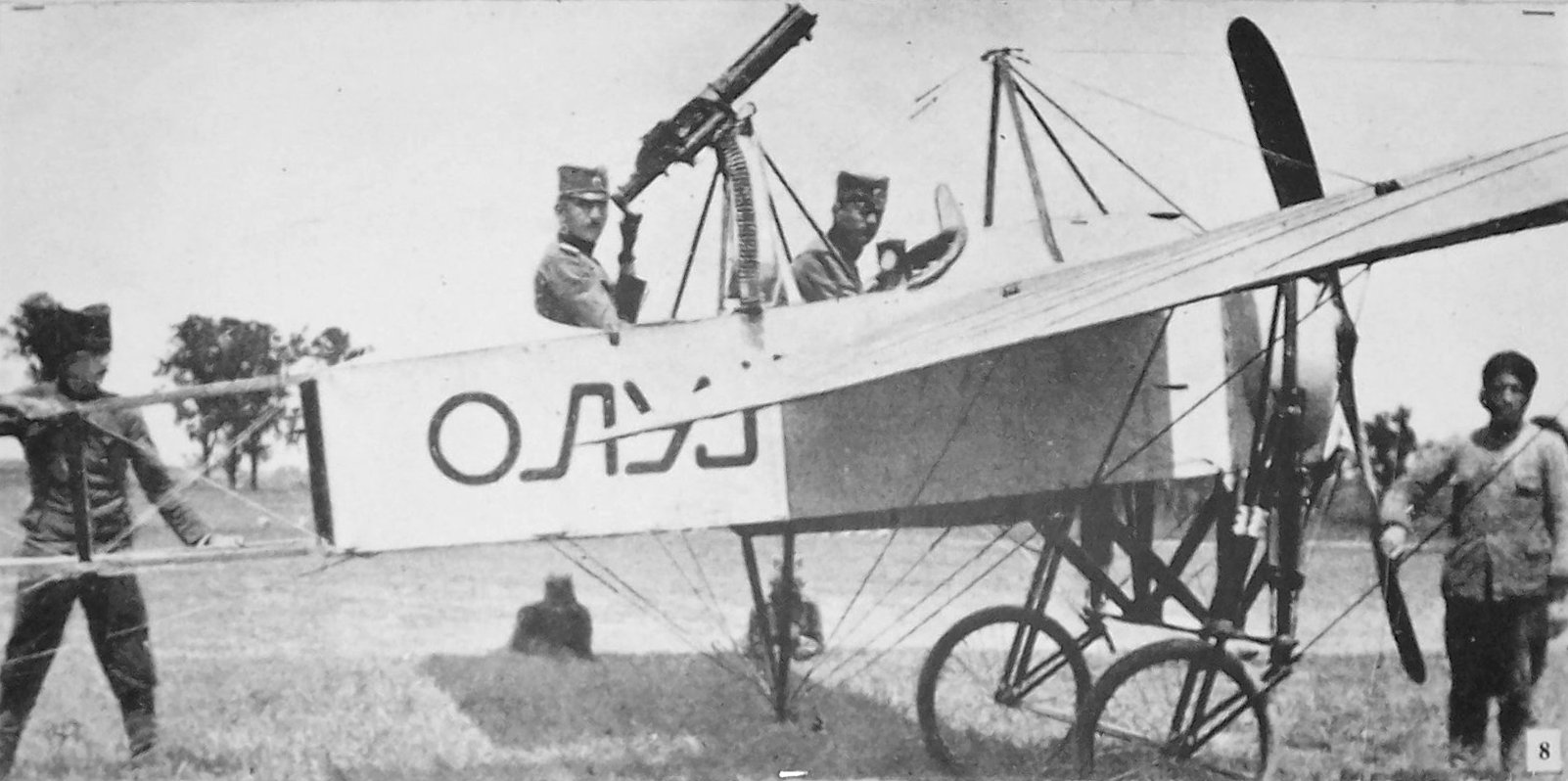
First Serbian armed airplane, Bleriot XI-2. Photo taken in 1915, predating the domestic aircraft production which began in 1923

Official logo of Ikarbus, formerly Ikarus, the first aircraft manufacturer in Serbia (1923)

== Factories ==
=== Ikarus (1923-62) ===
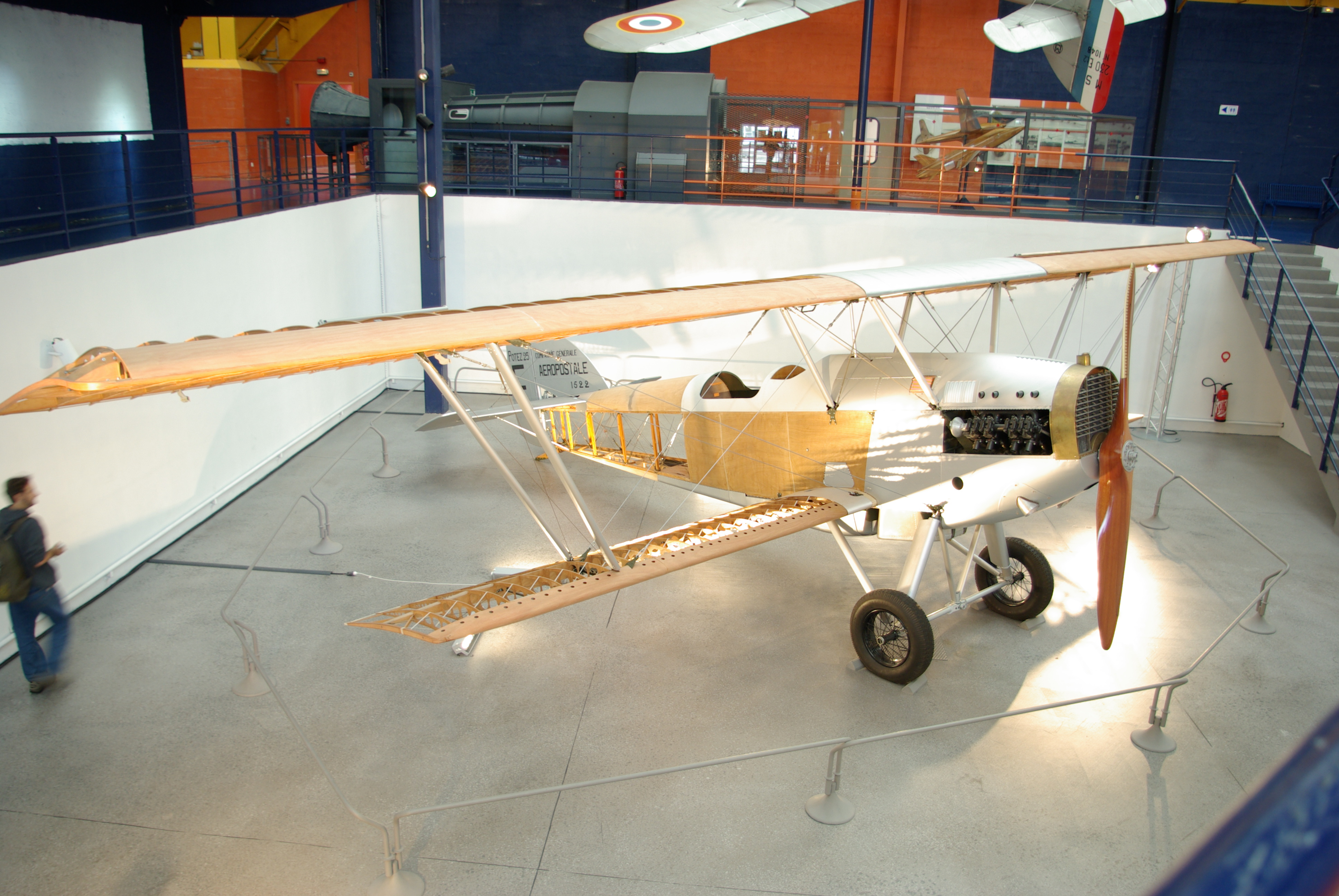
Potez 25, constructed in Ikarus

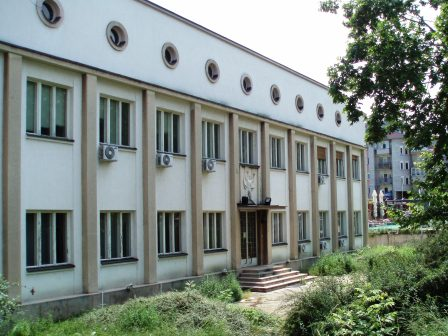
Ikarus administrative building, demolished in 2018

First proper factory was established on 20 November 1923 in Novi Sad. The driving force behind it foundation was Dimitrije Konjović, former pilot in the Austro-Hungary's air forces in World War I. He founded Ikarus together with brothers Dušan and Milivoj Kovačević and engineer Josip Mikl. Jointly with the Rogožarski factory, founded a bit later, they were given a task of producing the trainer aircraft "ŠB" (školski Brandenburg, literally "school(ing) Brandenburg"). In April 1924 first planes were delivered while in November 1924 the factory produced the first homemade aircraft as the company's designing bureau drafted the trainer flying boat "ŠM" (školski mornarički, "school naval (plane)").

In 1927-28 Ikarus built new facilities in Zemun, equipped for the serial production of airplanes and its own airfield. By the end of 1932, the headquarters of the company also moved to Zemun. The production in Novi Sad was completely discontinued in 1932. In 1934 the town of Zemun was officially merged into Belgrade.

In the 1923-41 period, Ikarus produced a total of 441 aircraft. Some of the best aircraft produced in the factory include observation plane Potez XV, light bomber Bristol Blenheim and fighters Hawker Fury and Ikarus IK-2. It was the first company which began producing gliders, in 1928. They also constructed the first Serbian and Yugoslav fighter plane, completely domestically designed, IK-1, in 1935, designed by Ljubomir Ilić and Kosta Sivčev.

Right after occupying Yugoslavia, Germans commandeered the factory on 17 April 1941. The complex was heavily bombed during the massive Allied Easter bombing of Belgrade in April 1944. The facilities of Ikarus were almost completely destroyed during the war, but the factory was rebuilt. In 1946 Zmaj and Rogožarski were merged with the Ikarus, after previously being nationalized. In 1954 the company began producing buses and, starting from 1960, the production of aircraft was being shut down and relocated to the SOKO factory in Mostar, Bosnia and Herzegovina. Production of the aircraft was completely discontinued in 1962 and, until that date, Ikarus produced a total of 475 planes after the war. The facilities were completely demolished and the area is today occupied by the residential buildings, stretching between the Hotel Jugoslavija on the east, and Palmira Toljatija Street (roughly blocks 9-A and 11-C. divided between the municipalities of Zemun and New Belgrade). The engineers and the design bureau were transferred to the Aeronautical Technical Institute in the Belgrade's suburb of Žarkovo. The company was ultimately renamed to Ikarbus.

Well known aircraft constructed in Ikarus after the war include fighter Ikarus S-49, trainers Ikarus 213 and Ikarus 522, light reconnaissance-bomber Ikarus 214 and baby twin-jet Ikarus 452M.

The administrative building of the company, which was built in 1938 as part of the complex, as of 2018 is one of the oldest surviving buildings in New Belgrade. In June 2017 it was announced that the building will be demolished so that private investor can build a highrise instead. Locals organized in an effort to adapt the building into the museum instead. In 2018 Citizen protested, demolished the construction hoarding and physically prevented the investor to destroy the building, so police intervened. Investor then posted a board which showed that the original building will be preserved but vastly expanded and superstructured. Still, a heavy demolition machinery was brought so citizens protested again in March. Inheritors of the pre-World War II owners of the "Ikarus" company, which was nationalized after 1945, applied for the restitution. The administrative building of the former airplane factory was a symbol of the industrial development of the Kingdom of Yugoslavia. Apart from being one of the oldest preserved objects in New Belgrade, it was the only representative of the Art Deco in the municipality. Citizens proposed that the building might be adapted into the Museum of New Belgrade or a branch of the Museum of Aviation. The building was not protected by the law. Still, the building was demolished in July 2018.

=== Rogožarski (1924-46) ===
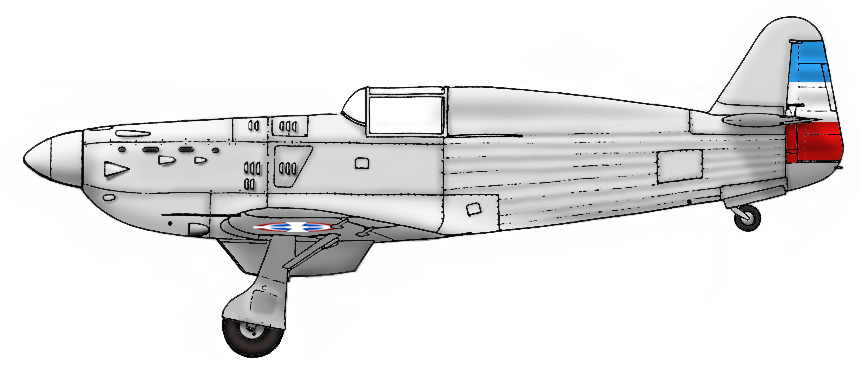
Rogožarski IK-3

Predecessor of the company was the Rogožarski carpentry workshop. It worked on the repairs of the confiscated airplanes in the World War I. In April 1924 the "First Serbian airplane factory Živojin Rogožarski" was founded in Belgrade by Živojin Rogožarski. At first, worked jointly with Ikarus on "ŠB". Due to the major financial losses, the company was taken over by the new owners in 1934. The Resavac and the Blagojević brothers transformed the company into the joint-stock company "Rogožarski A.D. Beograd" and the company was revived. It produced a total of 284 airplanes in the 1924-41 period, mostly designed locally.

Apart from the "ŠB", the best known aircraft manufactured in Rogožarski were trainers Fizir F1V and Rogožarski R-100, floatplane Rogožarski SIM-XIV-H and fighter Hawker Hurricane.

Rogožarski produced the IK-3 airplane, considered the finest Serbian fighter. It was a low-wing one-seat monoplane, constructed in 1936 by Ilić, Sivčev and Slobodan Zrnić. The prototype was finished in 1938 and the production began in 1940. Till the beginning of the World War II, in April 1941, only 12 airplanes were finished. Six were in service at 51st Independent Fighter Group of the 6th Fighter Aviation Regiment, which defended the capital Belgrade. They held their own against the Messerschmitt Bf 109 (Bf 109E) planes, during the German invasion. Three IK-3s were shot down, while 7 Messerschmitts were also gunned down and one was damaged. The three remaining IK-3s were destroyed by their crews on the ground, in order not to get captured by the advancing Germans.

The factory was located in the neighborhood of Palilula, bounded by the streets of Stanoja Glavaša, Dalmatinska, Starine Novaka and Kneza Danila. The new Communist authorities nationalized the company, merged it into Ikarus in 1946, while the facilities were transformed into the IKL (ball bearing factory) in 1948. The complex was demolished and in 2015 construction of the residential and commercial neighborhood of "Central Garden" began, which should include the 16-storey "Business Garden Tower".

=== Zmaj (1927-46) ===
In 1927 the "Zmaj" factory was established in Zemun. Full name was Fabrika aeroplana i hidroplana - Zmaj, Petrović i Šterić ("Airplane and flying boats factory Zmaj - Petrović & Šterić"). From the early 1930s the factory began producing the state's first training planes, training flying boats and the trainer fighter aircraft, using French design. During the 1927-41 period, 126 licensed (foreign designed) planes were produced, with additional 220 locally designed ones.

Production of the locally designed planes began in 1932. The factory produced, among others, fighters Hawker Hurricane, Hawker Fury and Dewoitine D.27, trainer Zmaj Fizir FP-2, and passenger transporter Spartan Cruiser for the Aeroput Air Traffic Society, the first air traffic company in Serbia and precursor of the modern Air Serbia.

After 1946, the company was adapted for the production of the agricultural machines, while the aircraft section was merged into Ikarus.

=== Brege / FAK (1927-42) ===
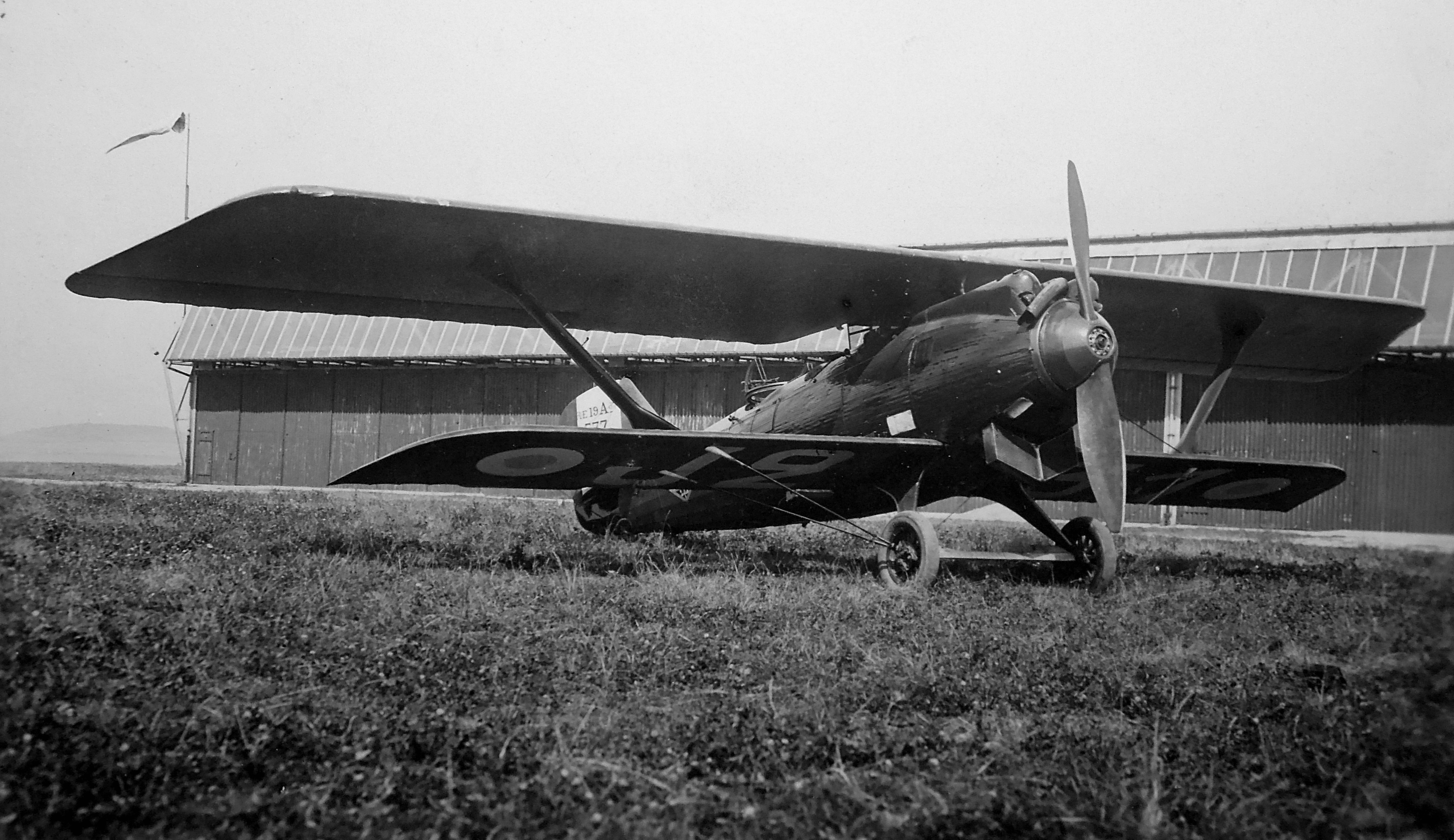
Breguet 19

In 1924 the Air Force decided to build an aircraft factory for its own needs, deep inside the state's territory. In September 1926, on the Divlje Polje locality near Kraljevo, construction of the new plant for the construction and repair of the aircraft began, which was finished in 1927. According to the contract with the government, it was soon taken over by the French Breguet Aviation company, which used it for the production of the Breguet 19 airplane type. The factory was officially called Breguet Aeroplanska radionica u Kraljevu ("Breguet airplane workshop in Kraljevo"), but was colloquially known as FAK (Fabrika aviona Kraljevo, "Kraljevo airplane factory"). Production of Breguet 19 began in 1928 and 470 units were made, more planes than any other factory in this period. The production was halted in 1933 when the contract expired and the French withdrew from the business. Air and Technics Institute in Kraljevo (VTZ, Vazduhoplovno-tehnički zavod), took over the premises. In this period repairs were conducted and the spare parts were produced.

Production was revitalized in 1939 when the State airplane factory (DFA, Državna fabrika aviona) was founded. The production included the modern and more complex two-engine bombers Dornier Do 17K, on the German license. During the Kraljevo massacre in October 1941, among over 2,000 victims executed by the occupational German forces, there were 473 employees of the factory.

During the withdrawal in front of the invading German army, Royal Yugoslav Army destroyed the most vital parts of the plant and the Germans never managed to repair it, though they used it for occasional repairs of the Breguet and Dornier planes. Those little remaining machines and equipment which survived were dismantled in 1942 and transported to Germany. After the war, authorities didn't try to restore the plant, instead, what remained of it was attached to the "Kraljevo railway wagon factory" (FVK, Fabrika vagona Kraljevo).

=== Utva (1937) ===
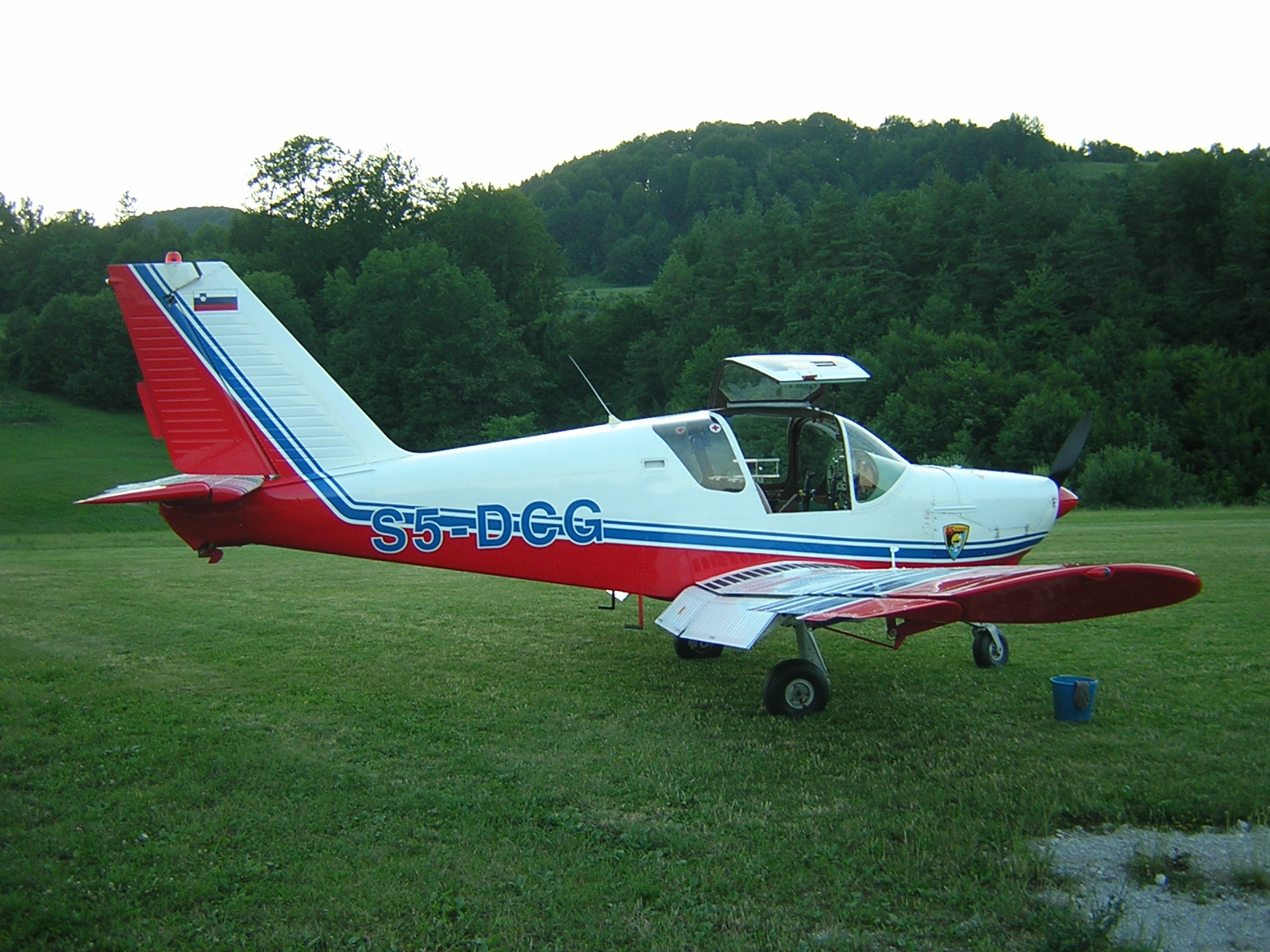
UTVA 75

The Glider Union "Utva" (Jedriličarska zadruga "Utva") was founded on 5 June 1937, also in Zemun. It produced only gliders until 1939 when it was transformed into the full aircraft factory "Utva" AD. In 1940 the factory was relocated to Pančevo where the German licensed Bücker Bü 131 (Bücker Jungmann) training aircraft were assembled. In Pančevo factory had its own airfield.

The pre-war gliders included Šoštarić Vrabac (designed by Ivo Šoštarić) and Čavka. A total of 39 gliders and 148 Bücker Jungmanns were constructed prior to 1941. As the factory was damaged during the war, it was rebuilt in the 1944-46 period and with Ikarus, to which Zmaj and Rogožanski were attached, became the main force in the aircraft industry.

Utva was restarted as a repair workshop and an airplane equipment factory, before resuming the aircraft production in 1948, though it continued to make parts and equipment for other aircraft producing companies, even from the abroad. The company is primarily known for its trainers. The best-known plane types include Utva Trojka, Utva 212, Utva 213 Vihor, Utva-65, Utva 66 and UTVA 75, so as the components for Soko J-22 Orao and Soko G-4 Super Galeb. In total, the company constructed over 900 aircraft. One of the newer models is a trainer Lasta 95.

In May 1996, the Lola Institute from the Belgrade's suburb of Železnik, merged with Utva into the Utva-Lola company. The factory was bombed on several occasions during the NATO bombing of Serbia in 1999 and was damaged a lot. The complex was partially reconstructed. In 2017 the state-owned company Yugoimport SDPR, which deals with the arms and the defense-related equipment, took over 96% of the shares of Utva-Lola.

The company, now called "Utva avio-industrija" remained in a dire financial situation. The company's bank account remained blocked, there were no promised investments and 10% of the workforce was fired. As of August 2018, representatives of the company's trade union claimed that the factory "is not capable of producing aircraft anymore". However, the company presented its new plane that same month, the training aircraft "Sova", actually a rehashed UTVA 75 with the Garmin avionics, which prompted public questions how acceptable is it to keep Utva "alive" at all. Design for "Sova" was finalized by 2022, when production began, marking company's 85th anniversary. It was also announced that the designing of a gyrocopter is in process. "Sova", officially "utva 75A41M", was granted certificate by the Directorate of the Civilian Aviation in June 2023, 44 years after the previous certificate issued to the factory.

=== Storch Aviation (2000) ===
The company was founded by Nestor Slepčev, who originally designed aircraft in Australia, but after 1999 moved the production to Čenej, close to Novi Sad. It is producing Slepcev Storch, a 3/4 scale ultra-light replica of the German Fieseler Fi 156 Storch from World War II. It is a two-seated plane, made of chromium and molybdenum, and produced in three versions, one of which is a four-seated and the other can land on the water. The planes are quite popular, being exported into 50 states.

=== Aero East Europe (2006) ===
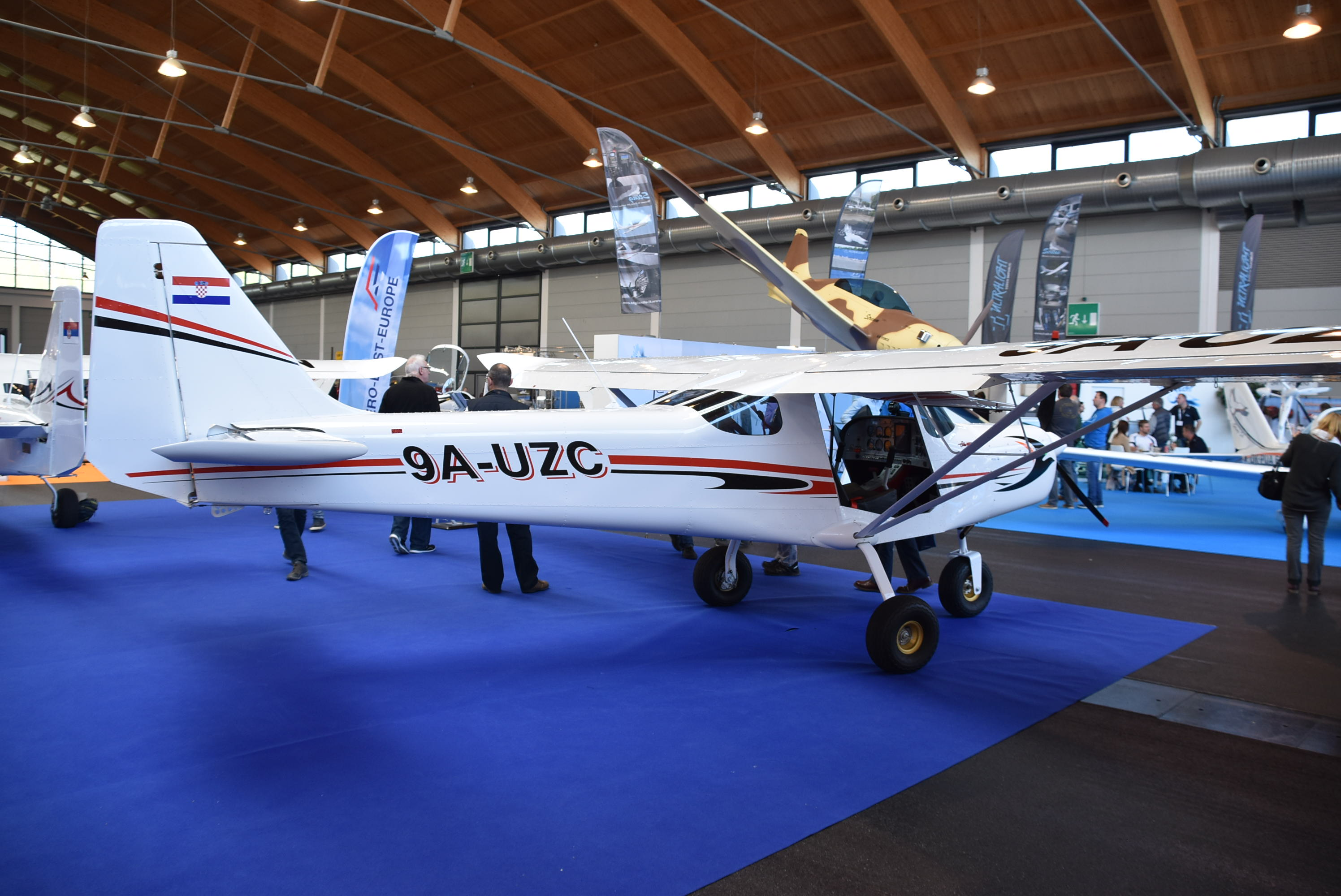
Aero East Europe Sila

A company specialized in the production of the light and ultra-light aircraft. It was founded in 2006 in Kraljevo, close to the location of the pre-war aircraft factory. It produces licensed Colombian AeroAndina aircraft (Kimbaya, Embera, Tumaco and Tyrona). As with the other ultra light aircraft, they are made from chrome and molybdenum.

In 2013 the company produced its own design, the Aero East Europe Sila ultra-light aircraft. There are several versions: Sila 450 C, Sila 750 C cruiser models, Sila 750 S STOL, the three-seat Sila 750 MT medical transport and the four-seat Sila 950. Design was developed in cooperation with the Department of Mechanical Engineering at the University of Belgrade. Apart from manufacturing, the company also maintains and repairs aircraft and aircraft engines.

=== Other ===
The two remaining interwar factories were "Vlajković", in Belgrade, and "Albatros", in Sremska Mitrovica.

Đorđe M. Popović (1907–56), used his family owned furniture company in Užice to build gliders during the Interbellum. Designed after the German Hols der Teufel gliders, the first specimen was finished in 1934, bearing the mark K1-YU. The second followed in 1935, as K1B-YU. Few more were finished before the outbreak of World War II. After the war, new authorities confiscated Popović's assets.

In the workshops of the Aeroput, a three-seat twin-engine Aeroput MMS-3, or Mitrović MMS-3 was constructed in 1936. It was made for the company's air taxi service.

"Arsi Aviation", founded by Aleksandar Arsić (1953-2023) and seated in Belgrade's neighborhood of Višnjica, obtained rights to produce Swedish high performance carbon fiber ultralight aircraft Esqual in 2007. There were only some 20 specimens of the specific 1C version, of which 5 were completed in Serbia. There was no serialized production, but they were made and sold in segments (kits), which were then combined together by the byer. Arsić was killed when he crashed in his own plane on 10 August 2023 at the 13. Maj airfield in Belgrade.

== Supporting industry ==
=== Parts and equipment ===
The "IAM" and "Vlajković-Walter" factories produced airplane engines and both were located in the Belgrade's industrialized suburb of Rakovica.

"IAM" ("Airplane engines industry", Industrija aeroplanskih motora A.D.) was founded in 1927. It was 50% owned by the foreign investors until 1936 when it was nationalized. It produced licensed plane engins: Gnome-Rhône Jupiter, Gnome-Rhône 7K, Gnome-Rhône 9K, Gnome-Rhône Mistral Major. In 1940, assembling of the Praga trucks began. After the war, IAM became IMR, Industrija Motora Rakovica, one of the largest factory in general in Yugoslavia. One section within the IMR continued to manufacture and repair aircraft engines, though it was best known for the production of tractors. By the 2010s barely operational, it went bankrupt in 2017.

Aircraft engines factory "S.Vlajković and Sons" originated as the carpentry workshop in 1925, founded by Svetozar Vlajković. The shop, located in the neighborhood of Dorćol, repaired Breguet XIV aircraft and its engines. The factory then moved to Rakovica and started the production of the Walter NZ engines. In 1948 it was transformed into the 21. maj factory which, among other products, made aircraft engines, starting with the piston engines, but sine the late 1950s including the licensed jet engine Astazou XIV M1 for the Aérospatiale Gazelle helicopters and parts for the jet engines Viper 632-41, 632-46 and 636-41. It also produced other special helicopter parts, like the rotor hubs and transmissions. IMR obtained a General Motors license to repair their engines while in the 1980s it produced engine parts for Boeing and Tupolev. With decline since the 1990s, it mostly performed repairs of helicopter parts. Bankruptcy proceedings started in 2016.

"Teleoptik (factory)", the first factory which dealt with the telephony, optics and precision mechanics, was founded in 1922 in Dorćol. Production of the aircraft instruments, coolers and other equipment began in 1928. Originally, all products were foreign licenses, but from 1935 the company began designing the equipment. In 1940, the factory moved to Zemun where and continued to produce some of the aircraft products. It went bankrupt in 2007, but the optics section survived as Teleoptik-Žiroskopi.

"Prospekt Nestor", another precise mechanics plant, was open in 1938 in the Belgrade's neighborhood of Lion. It produced military equipment, but also some aircraft equipment. After the war it was nationalized, transformed into the "Precizna mehanika" and moved to the neighborhood of Učiteljsko Naselje. Though not officially bankrupt, especially after the botched privatization in 2007, "Precizna mehanika" is out of business.

Another producer of the aircraft instruments was the optics and precision mechanics company "Mikron", in the Belgrade's neighborhood of Krunski Venac. They also tested and adjusted optical instruments. In 1947 it was annexed to the "Nikola Tesla elektronska industrija" factory which switched to the production of the home appliances. It was privatized in 2006 and is effectively out of business.

"Prospekt Jasenica" was the first factory to produce the licensed spark plugs. They also repaired the Breguet 19 Lorraine aircraft engines. The offices were in Zemun, but the factory was in the town of Smederevska Palanka. After the war, the factory became the core of the "Goša" factory, which switched to the rail wagons production, and went bankrupt in 2018.

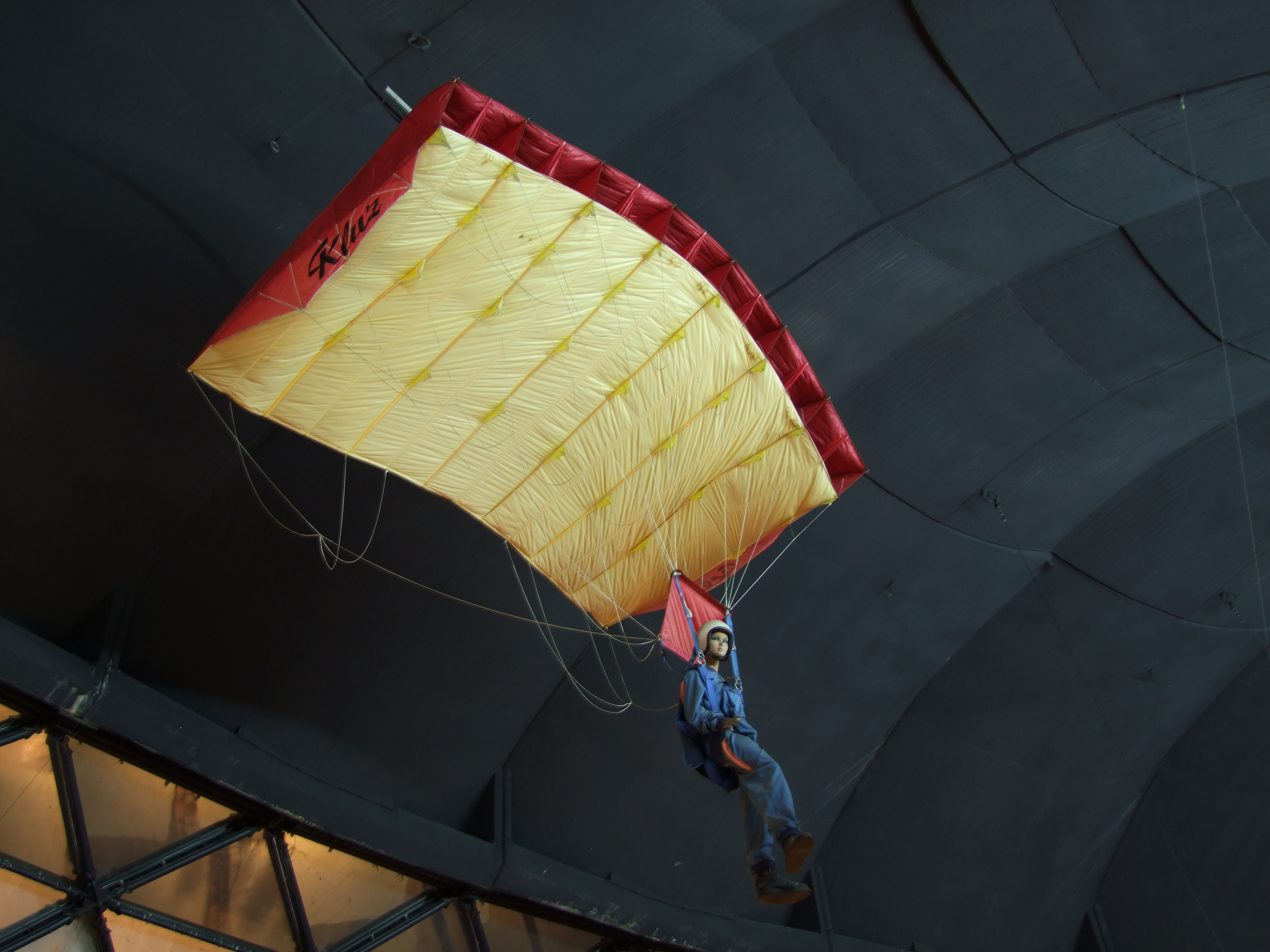
Parachute Kluz PS-11

The "Knebl and Dietrich" factory was founded in the town of Inđija in 1923, as the "factory of flying equipment, parachutes and leather suits". Production of parachutes began in 1934, originally under the license from the US Irvin Airchute Company. Co-owner Miroslav Dietrich designed first Serbian parachute, "Spas", in 1930, but the production started after the US licensed ones. Until 1941, the company produced 2,500 parachutes. The company was nationalized in 1947, renamed "Franjo Kluz" and moved to Belgrade. The production diversified, including sports, military, landing, training, pilot, emergency, brake, cargo and other special parachutes, overalls, suits, armor vests, paragliders and other special equipment, overalls, suits, etc. By 2007, over 200.000 parachutes were produced and exported, while additional 55,000 were produced for domestic use, both military and civilian. The company was divided in several parts which mostly went bankrupt, but "Kluz padobrani", which handled the parachutes production was privatized in 2006. Since 2007/08 the production was restored in cooperation with the German company Brüggemann.

=== Maintenance and design ===
The origins of the Aircraft Institute "Moma Stanojlović" (Vazduhoplovni zavod Moma Stanojlović) predate the World War II. Founded in 1949 as the workshop for the repairs of the aircraft engines, the Aircraft Institute "Moma Stanojlović" (Vazduhoplovni zavod Moma Stanojlović) was enlarged in 1952 into the major overhaul facility. It was seated in the Belgrade's suburb of Kneževac. In 1971 it merged with another repair facility "Jastreb" from Zemun. The current name of the company was adopted in 1976 and in 1977 it moved to the Batajnica Airport. The institute overhauled sub-sonic and supersonic aircraft, like MiG-21, Soko J-22 Orao, Soko G-2 Galeb, Soko G-4 Super Galeb, Soko J-21 Jastreb, Antonov An-2, Antonov An-26, Canadairs, Utva, Zlin and helicopters like Gazelle, Aérospatiale Alouette, Mil Mi-2, Mil Mi-8 and Mil Mi-17. It also repaired pistons, propellers and free turbine engines. It also repaired and maintained radio-navigational equipment, flying and photo equipment. The institute also produced large number of parts and equipment. It was damaged during the 1999 NATO bombing. In cooperation with the Aeronautical Technical Institute, it developed the prototype of the Vrabac Mini UAV mini drone.

The Mihajlo Pupin Institute, founded in 1946 in Belgrade for development of computer systems, automation, robotics and telecommunications, designed and constructed various aviation projects: flying simulators for the pilots training, simulators for training of the anti-aircraft artillerymen, visual systems for the simulators, systems for detection of radar emitters, etc. The institute is located in the Zvezdara Forest.

The Aeronautical Technical Institute was founded in 1946. It was a research and developing institute, connected with the flight department of the School of Mechanical Engineering in Belgrade, but administered by the Yugoslav army. It was focused on the research, development and design of the aerodynamics, flight mechanics, structures, stability, aircraft structures, propulsion, etc. The facilities of the institute, which include subsonic and transonic wind tunnels, are located in Žarkovo. In 1992 the institute was administratively abolished and attached to the Military Technical Institute.

"Minel Inženjering Eving" is part of the Minel Concern, founded in 1948. It is focused on the electric energy and flight engineering. In 2013 it was given a task of reconstructing and upgrading aircraft platforms and parking spaces of the Belgrade Nikola Tesla Airport.

"Aeroinžinjering" company, founded by professor Aleksandar Patrnogić (1923-2012), since the early 1980s worked, through consulting and engineering, on the founding of the airports and air bases abroad, including the original ideas, maintenance, supply and servicing of the equipment. It went bankrupt in 2010.

== Sources ==
- Bill Gunston (1993). World Encyclopedia of Aircraft Manufacturers. Annapolis: Naval Institute Press.
- Ognjan Petrović (2000). "Војни аероплани Краљевине СХС/Југославије (Део I: 1918–1930.)" [Military airplanes of the Kingdoms of SHS/Yugoslavia (Part I: 1918-1930)]. Let = Flight: Časopis za Istoriju Vazduhoplovstva (in Serbian). Museum of Aviation, Belgrade. ISSN 1450-684X.
- Ognjan Petrović (2004). "Војни аероплани Краљевине СХС/Југославије (Део II: 1931–1941.)" [Military airplanes of the Kingdoms of SHS/Yugoslavia (Part II: 1931-1941)]. Let = Flight: Časopis za Istoriju Vazduhoplovstva (in Serbian). Museum of Aviation, Belgrade. ISSN 1450-684X.
- Čedomir J. Janić, Ognjan M. Petrović (2017). Творци ваздухопловства Краљевине Југославије [Creators of the Kingdom of Yugoslavia's air force] (in Serbian). Belgrade: Museum of science and technics. ISBN 978-86-82977-60-5.
