= Corvus Racer 312 =

Chinese ultralight aircraft

Racer 312

General information
- Type: Ultralight aircraft and Light-sport aircraft
- National origin: China
- Manufacturer: Corvus Aerospace (Suzhou)
- Status: Under development (2015)

History
- First flight: 1 November 2013

The Corvus Racer 312 is a Chinese ultralight and light-sport aircraft under development by Corvus Aerospace (Suzhou) of Suzhou and first flown 1 November 2013. The aircraft is to be supplied complete and ready-to-fly.

== Design and development ==
The Racer 312 was designed as a smaller version of the Corvus Racer 540, to comply with the Fédération Aéronautique Internationale microlight rules and US light-sport aircraft rules. It was designed and the prototype built over a period of 13 months in 2012–13.

The Racer 312 features a cantilever low-wing, two-seats-in-side-by-side configuration under a bubble canopy, fixed tricycle landing gear and a single engine in tractor configuration. The aircraft is made from composite material and its 8.33 m (27.3 ft) span wing employs split flaps. The standard engine fitted is the 100 hp (75 kW) Rotax 912ULS four-stroke powerplant. With this engine the cruise speed is anticipated to be 280 km/h (174 mph).

As of February 2017, the design does not appear on the Federal Aviation Administration's list of approved special light-sport aircraft.

== Specifications (Racer 312) ==
Data from Tacke

General characteristics

- Crew: one
- Capacity: one passenger
- Wingspan: 8.33 m (27 ft 4 in)
- Empty weight: 295 kg (650 lb)
- Gross weight: 472.5 kg (1,042 lb)
- Fuel capacity: 108 litres (24 imp gal; 29 US gal)
- Powerplant: 1 × Rotax 912ULS four cylinder, liquid and air-cooled, four stroke aircraft engine, 75 kW (101 hp)
- Propellers: 3-bladed composite

Performance

- Cruise speed: 280 km/h (170 mph, 150 kn)
- Never exceed speed: 340 km/h (210 mph, 180 kn)
