= Aero East Europe =

Serbian aircraft manufacturer

Aero East Europe d.o.o.
- Company type: Privately held company
- Industry: Aerospace
- Headquarters: Jagodina, Serbia
- Products: Ultralight aircraft, light aircraft
- Website: www.aeroeast.net

Aero East Europe d.o.o. (styled as Aero-East-Europe) is a Serbian aircraft manufacturer that was based in Kraljevo and is now in Jagodina. The company specializes in the design and manufacture of ultralight aircraft and light aircraft in the form of ready-to-fly aircraft.

The company is a društvo sa ograničenom odgovornošću, a Serbian Private Limited Liability Company.

The company has designed and built the Sila line of light aircraft. Sila stands for Serbian industry light aircraft, but also means force in the Serbian language. The range includes the Sila 450 C and Sila 750 C cruiser models, the Sila 750 S STOL, the three-seat Sila 750 MT medical transport and the four-seat Sila 950.

The company designs aircraft in conjunction with the Department of Mechanical Engineering at the University of Belgrade.

Aside from aircraft manufacturing, the company also conducts aircraft maintenance and aircraft engine maintenance.

== Aircraft ==
Summary of aircraft built by Aero East Europe:

- Aero East Europe Sila (Serbian industry light aircraft) series

== See also ==
- Aircraft industry of Serbia
