= Embera =

Embera or Emberá may refer to:

- Emberá people, an ethnic group of Colombia and Panama
- Embera language, a group of languages of Colombia and Panama
- Comarca Emberá, a territory of Panama

== See also ==
- AeroAndina MXP-158 Embera, an aircraft
- Hyundai Sonata Embera, a car
- Embra
