= Corvus Fusion =

Italian light sport aircraft

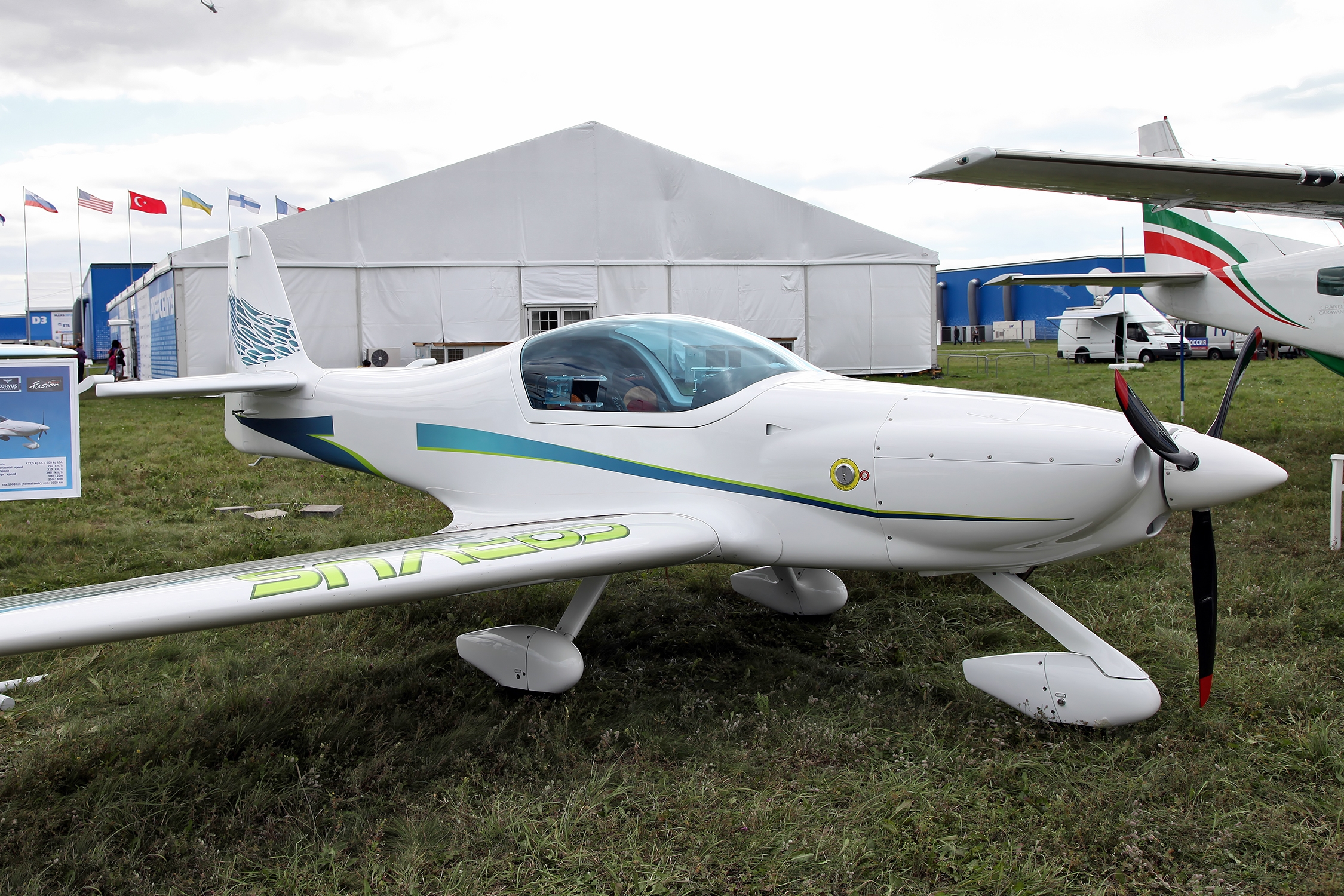

General information
- Type: Touring monoplane
- National origin: Hungary
- Manufacturer: Corvus-Hungary

The Corvus Fusion is a two-seat, low wing, light sport aircraft produced by Corvus Hungary LLC in Italy.

== Design and development ==
The Corvus Fusion is an all composite aircraft offered either as a factory built aircraft or as a kit. It was conceived by Andras Voloscsuk, Chief Executive Engineer, as "... an ultralight aircraft for enthusiasts who would love to try something similar that the Racer 540 can do." It was announced in August 2011 and introduced 27 January 2012 in Pordenone, Italy.

The Corvus Fusion features an inverted oil system and a symmetrical airfoil, which allows it to fly equally well either upright or inverted. It is available with either conventional landing gear or tricycle gear and with a ballistic parachute.

During a demo flight on 30 March 2012, a Corvus Fusion was flown through several aerobatic manoeuvres including loops and barrel rolls.

== Specifications ==
Data from Corvus-Hungary website

General characteristics

- Crew: 2
- Length: 22 ft 0 in (6.7 m)
- Wingspan: 27 ft 4 in (8.33 m)
- Height: 7 ft 6 in (2.28 m)
- Wing area: 116.62 sq ft (10.834 m^{2})
- Empty weight: 647 lb (293.7 kg)
- Gross weight: 1,323 lb (600 kg)
- Fuel capacity: 130 liters (29 imp gal; 34 U.S. gal)
- Powerplant: 1 × ULPower 260iSA , 107 hp (80 kW)

Performance

- g limits: +6/-3 (+11.3/-5.6 ultimate)
