= World Aircraft Vision =

American light aircraft

Vision
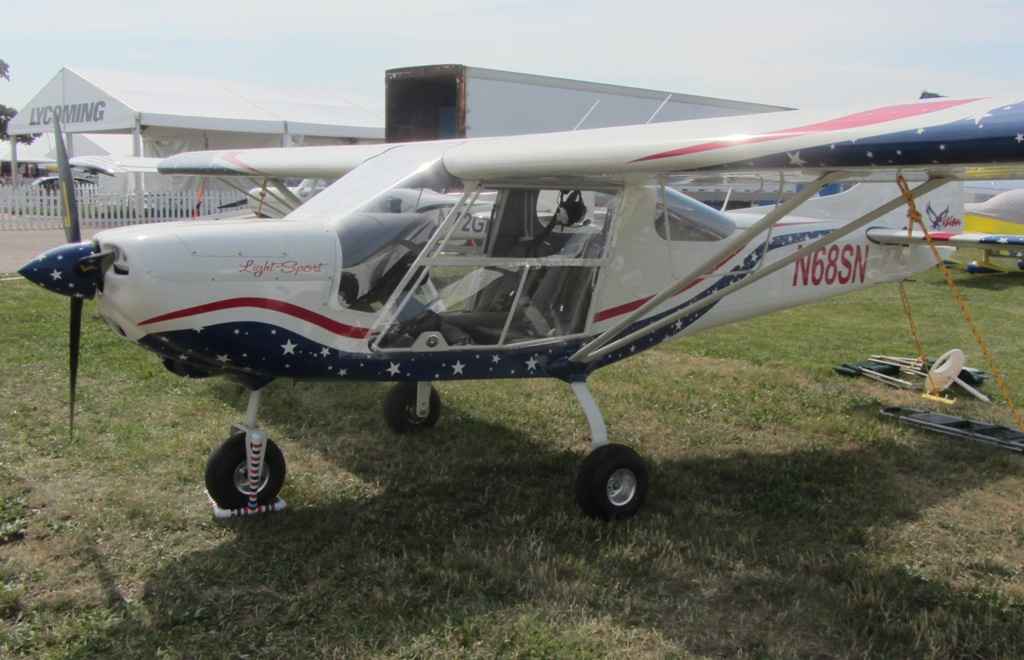

General information
- Type: Amateur-built aircraft Light-sport aircraft
- National origin: United States
- Manufacturer: World Aircraft Company
- Status: Production anticipated in 2014
- Number built: 2 (2012)

History
- Introduction date: 2012
- Developed from: AeroAndina MXP-1000 Tayrona

The World Aircraft Vision, also called the Sentinel, is an American STOL amateur-built aircraft, produced by the World Aircraft Company. The aircraft was publicly introduced at Sun 'n Fun in 2012 and production is expected to commence in 2014. It is supplied as a kit for amateur construction or as a complete ready-to-fly aircraft.

== Design and development ==
A development of the World Aircraft Spirit, the Vision features a strut-braced high-wing, a two-seats-in-side-by-side configuration enclosed cockpit that is 48.5 in (123 cm) wide, fixed tricycle landing gear and a single engine in tractor configuration. It also has large clear plastic doors and an enlarged front windshield to enhance visibility.

The aircraft is made from aluminum sheet. Its 31.4 ft (9.6 m) span wing has an area of 132 sq ft (12.3 m^{2}) and mounts flaps. The wing is supported by "V" struts and jury struts. The aircraft's recommended engine is the 100 hp (75 kW) Rotax 912ULS four-stroke powerplant. The tricycle landing gear is strengthened for rough field operations and includes an adjustable nose strut shock absorber. Electric rudder trim is standard.

The aircraft has a design maximum gross weight of 1,653 lb (750 kg), but is restricted to 1,320 lb (599 kg) if flown in the US light-sport aircraft category.

Vision kits are fully assembled at the factory and then disassembled for customer delivery and may be shipped painted as well.

As of October 2012, the design appears on the Federal Aviation Administration's list of approved special light-sport aircraft under the name Sentinel.

== Operational history ==
By November 2012 two examples had been registered in the United States with the Federal Aviation Administration under the Sentinel name.

== Specifications (Vision) ==
Data from Kitplanes and World Aircraft Company

General characteristics

- Crew: one
- Capacity: one passenger
- Length: 22 ft 3 in (6.78 m)
- Wingspan: 31 ft 3 in (9.53 m)
- Wing area: 131.86 sq ft (12.250 m^{2})
- Empty weight: 728 lb (330 kg)
- Gross weight: 1,320 lb (599 kg) light-sport aircraft version, 1,653 lb (750 kg) for other versions
- Fuel capacity: 28 U.S. gallons (110 L; 23 imp gal)
- Powerplant: 1 × Rotax 912ULS four cylinder, liquid and air-cooled, four stroke aircraft engine, 100 hp (75 kW)
- Propellers: 3-bladed composite

Performance

- Cruise speed: 110 mph (180 km/h, 96 kn)
- Stall speed: 27 mph (43 km/h, 23 kn) flaps down
- Never exceed speed: 143 mph (230 km/h, 124 kn)
- Range: 625 mi (1,006 km, 543 nmi) with no reserve
- Wing loading: 10.0 lb/sq ft (49 kg/m^{2})
