= World Aircraft Spirit =

Spirit
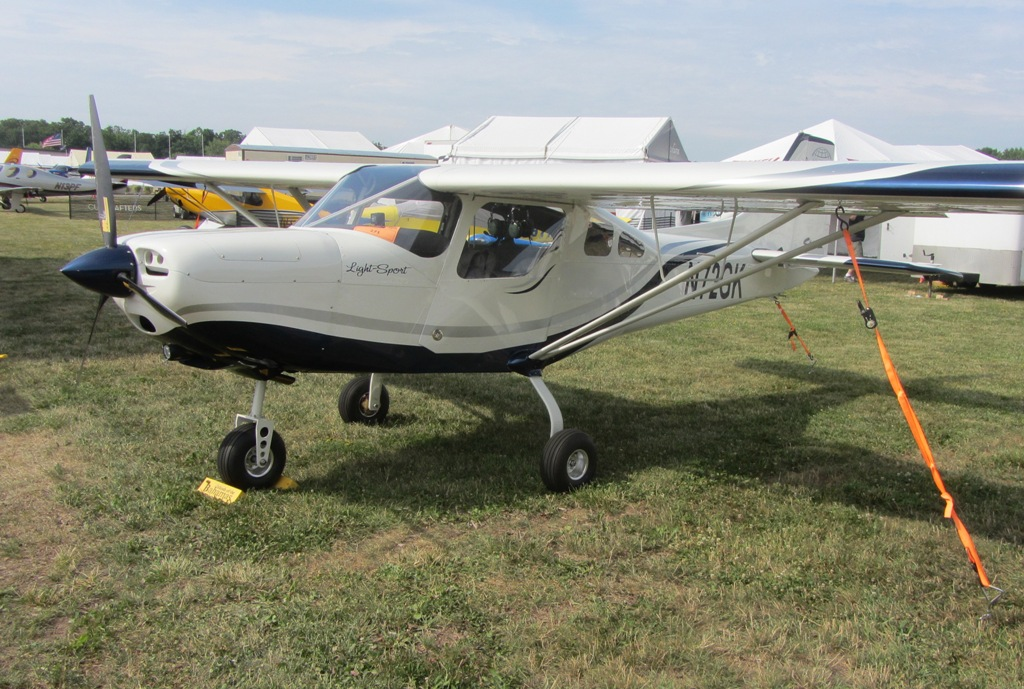

General information
- Type: Amateur-built aircraft Light-sport aircraft
- National origin: Colombia/United States
- Manufacturer: World Aircraft Company
- Designer: Max Tedesco
- Status: Production anticipated for 2014
- Number built: 55 (2011)

History
- Introduction date: 2011
- Developed from: AeroAndina MXP-150 Kimbaya
- Variant: World Aircraft Vision

The World Aircraft Spirit is a Colombian/American amateur-built aircraft, designed by Max Tedesco and produced by World Aircraft Company. The aircraft was publicly introduced at AirVenture in 2011 and production is expected to commence in 2014. It is supplied as a kit for amateur construction or as a complete ready-to-fly aircraft.

== Design and development ==
The Spirit features a strut-braced high-wing, a two-seats-in-side-by-side configuration enclosed cockpit that is 48 in (122 cm) wide, fixed tricycle landing gear and a single engine in tractor configuration.

The aircraft is made from aluminum sheet. Its 32.9 ft (10.0 m) span wing has an area of 132 sq ft (12.3 m^{2}) and mounts flaps. The wing is supported by "V" struts and jury struts. The aircraft's recommended engine power range is 100 to 130 hp (75 to 97 kW) and standard engines used include the 100 hp (75 kW) Rotax 912ULS, 100 hp (75 kW) Continental O-200 and the 100 hp (75 kW) Lycoming IO-233 four-stroke powerplants.

The aircraft has a design maximum gross weight of 1,653 lb (750 kg), but is restricted to 1,320 lb (599 kg) if flown in the US light-sport aircraft category.

The Spirit airframe is constructed in Colombia and then shipped to World Aircraft's facility at Henry County Airport in Paris, Tennessee for final assembly and paint. Kits shipped are fully assembled and then disassembled for customer delivery and may be shipped painted as well. Construction time from the supplied kit is estimated as 110 hours.

As of October 2012, the design appears on the Federal Aviation Administration's list of approved special light-sport aircraft.

== Operational history ==
By December 2011 55 examples had been completed and flown.

== Specifications (Spirit) ==
Data from Kitplanes, World Aircraft Company and AVweb

General characteristics

- Crew: one
- Capacity: one passenger
- Length: 22 ft 3 in (6.78 m)
- Wingspan: 32 ft 10 in (10.01 m)
- Wing area: 132 sq ft (12.3 m^{2})
- Empty weight: 728 lb (330 kg)
- Gross weight: 1,320 lb (599 kg) light-sport aircraft version, 1,653 lb (750 kg) for other versions
- Fuel capacity: 24 U.S. gallons (91 L; 20 imp gal)
- Powerplant: 1 × Rotax 912ULS four cylinder, liquid and air-cooled, four stroke aircraft engine, 100 hp (75 kW)
- Propellers: 3-bladed composite

Performance

- Cruise speed: 115 mph (185 km/h, 100 kn)
- Stall speed: 35 mph (56 km/h, 30 kn) flaps down
- Never exceed speed: 143 mph (230 km/h, 124 kn)
- Range: 600 mi (970 km, 520 nmi)
- Maximum glide ratio: 10.5:1
- Rate of climb: 950 ft/min (4.8 m/s)
- Wing loading: 10.0 lb/sq ft (49 kg/m^{2})

Avionics

- Garmin panel
- autopilot
- ADS-B
