= Renegade Falcon LS =

General information
- Type: Touring monoplane
- National origin: United States
- Manufacturer: Renegade Light Sport
- Number built: 24

History
- Developed from: Corvus Phantom

The Falcon LS is a two-seat, low wing, light sport aircraft originally produced by Corvus Aircraft in Hungary as the Corvus Phantom and imported into the US by T&T Aviation between 2008–2010 and by Renegade Light Sport 2010–present.

There is disagreement between Corvus Aircraft and Renegade Light Sport as to whether the design has been licensed or reverse engineered.

== Design and development ==
On 6 October 2010 the Falcon LS became the first airplane to fly with the Lycoming IO-233-LSA engine. Originally T&T Aviation was selected by Lycoming to help develop their IO-233-LSA engine. When Renegade bought out T&T Aviation they continued the engine development partnership with Lycoming. The IO-233-LSA produces 115 hp (86 kW) when equipped with a carburetor and a Champion electronic ignition system. Renegade installed a capacitor discharge ignition, fuel injection, and a "Vetterman" cross-flow exhaust system to achieve 123 hp (92 kW).

The Falcon LS features a 46 in (117 cm) wide cabin, a ballistic parachute, and wings that can be removed in 15 minutes for ground transport or storage. T&T Aviation demonstrated 1.5 revolution spins, loops, and barrel rolls in the Falcon LS. Renegade plans a bigger baggage compartment.

== Operational history ==
In March 2017 there were seven Falcon LS aircraft registered with the Federal Aviation Administration in the USA.

== Variants ==
Falcon LS
Light-sport aircraft imported by T&T Aviation. Available only with tricycle gear.
Falcon LS 2.0 Mizzoura
Light-sport aircraft manufactured by Renegade Light Sport in partnership with Corvus and equipped with the Lycoming IO-233-LSA powerplant and a new wing design. Available with either taildragger or tricycle gear and can be converted back and forth in one hour. Cabin width is 50 in (127 cm).
Falcon T
Introduced at the 2012 Sebring US Sport Aviation Expo, the aircraft has conventional landing gear ("T" indicates "Taildragger") and is flown from the right seat. Capable of light aerobatics but not approved for it under LSA rules. Is available with an optional "shark mouth" P-40 paint scheme reminiscent of a Curtiss P-40 Warhawk.

== Specifications (Falcon LS 2.0) ==
Data from Renegade website

General characteristics

- Crew: 2
- Length: 20.9 ft (6.4 m)
- Wingspan: 31.5 ft (9.6 m)
- Wing area: 122.66 sq ft (11.395 m^{2})
- Empty weight: 795 lb (361 kg)
- Gross weight: 1,320 lb (599 kg)
- Fuel capacity: 28 U.S. gallons (110 L; 23 imp gal)
- Powerplant: 1 × Lycoming IO-233-LSA , 123 hp (92 kW)

Performance

- Maximum speed: 140 mph (220 km/h, 120 kn)
- Cruise speed: 129 mph (207 km/h, 112 kn)
- Never exceed speed: 167 mph (269 km/h, 145 kn)
- Range: 530 mi (850 km, 460 nmi)
- g limits: +6/-3
- Maximum glide ratio: 14:1

Avionics

- Dynon or Grand Rapids glass cockpit
