= World Aircraft Company =

- Company type: Private company
- Industry: Aerospace
- Founded: 2008
- Defunct: 2018
- Headquarters: Paris, Tennessee United States
- Key people: Eric Giles
- Products: kit aircraft
- Website: www.worldaircraftco.com

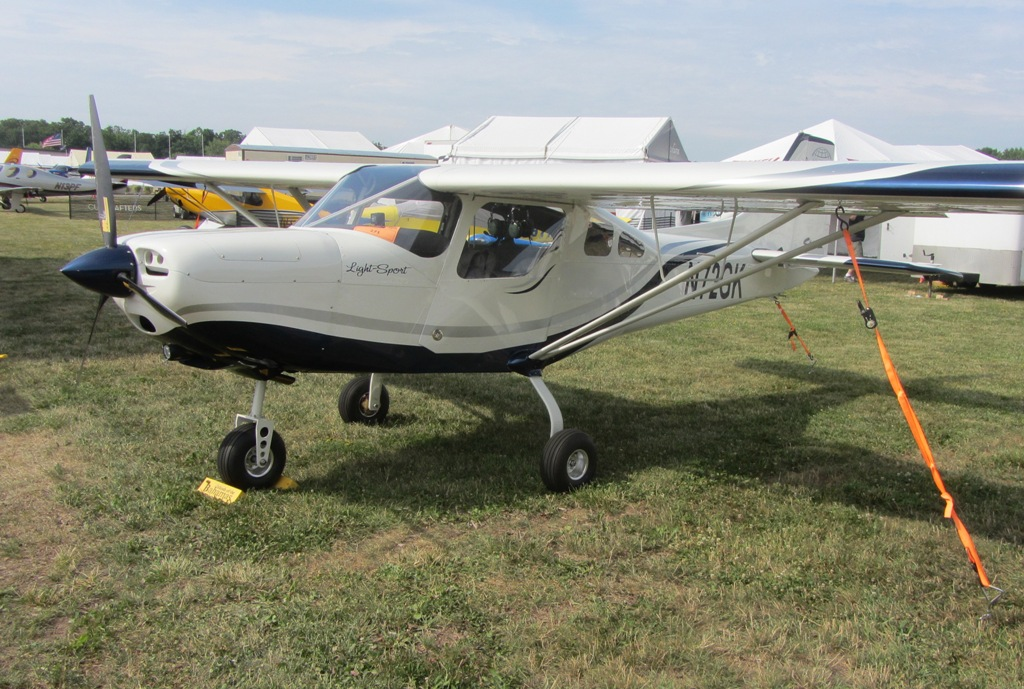
World Aircraft Company Spirit

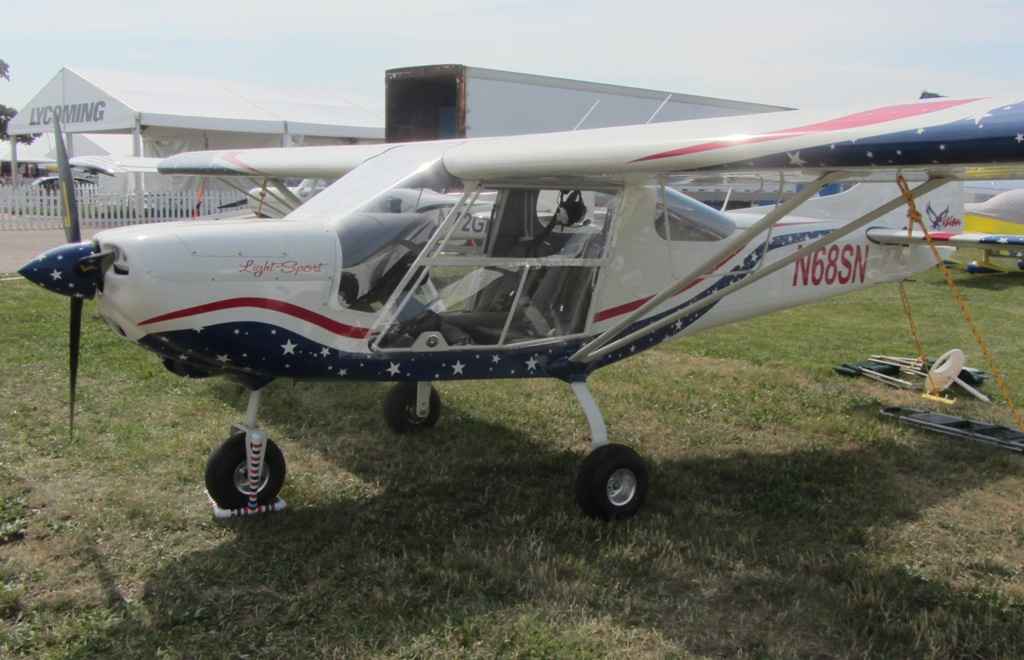
World Aircraft Company Vision

World Aircraft Company was an American aircraft manufacturer of light-sport aircraft headquartered in Paris, Tennessee.

The company manufactured AeroAndina aircraft designed by South American engineer, Max Tedesco with production starting in 2014.

The company was dissolved in January 2018.

== Aircraft ==
Summary of aircraft built by World Aircraft Company
Model name	First flight	Number built	Type
World Aircraft Spirit	2011	55 (2011)	Light Sport high-wing
World Aircraft Vision	2011	2 (2012)	Light Sport high-wing observation
World Aircraft Freedom	2013	In development	Low wing S-LSA
World Aircraft Surveyor	2012	1	Open fuselage high-wing pusher
