= Kluz =

Kluz is the surname of the following people

- Edward Kluz (born in 1980), British painter and illustrator
- Franjo Kluz (1913-1944), Yugoslav pilot and People's Hero
- Kenneth Kluz (born in 1956), Canadian provincial politician

== See also ==
- KLUZ-TV, Albuquerque virtual television channel
- Kluz PS-11, sport parachute
