= Aeris Naviter AN-2 Enara =

Spanish helicopter

An-2 Enara

General information
- Type: Helicopter
- National origin: Spain
- Manufacturer: Aeris Naviter
- Status: Development ended (2012)

History
- Introduction date: 2009
- First flight: Pending

The Aeris Naviter AN-2 Enara (Basque for 'Swallow') is a Spanish helicopter that was under development by Aeris Naviter of San Sebastián. The AN-2 was first shown at the 2009 Paris Air Show at Paris–Le Bourget Airport. The aircraft was intended to be supplied as a kit for amateur construction or as a complete ready-to-fly-aircraft.

The AN-2 was intended to have certification completed in the European Aviation Safety Agency Very Light Rotorcraft category by May 2010, and then again by the end of 2012 but, by January 2013, this does not seem to have been completed. Kits were intended to be ready for delivery in February 2010, but were not yet available as of January 2013. By late in 2011 there was no indication that the prototype had been flown.

By 2012 the company website was redirected to Cicare Europe and all mention of the AN-2 had been removed. It is likely development had ended by that point.

== Design and development ==
The AN-2 Enara features a two-rotor coaxial main rotor, a two-seats-in tandem enclosed cockpit, tricycle landing gear with suspension, an H-tail and a four-cylinder, four-stroke, 115 hp (86 kW) BMW automotive engine. Plans for other powerplants include the four cylinder, air-cooled, four-stroke, dual-ignition 115 hp (86 kW) Lycoming IO-233 light-sport aircraft engine.

The aircraft fuselage is made from aluminium sheet. Its 6.99 m (22.9 ft) diameter two-bladed rotors both have chords of 18 cm (7.1 in). The aircraft has an empty weight of 390 kg (860 lb) and a gross weight of 600 kg (1,323 lb), giving a useful load of 210 kg (463 lb).

== Specifications (AN-2 Enara) ==
Data from Bayerl

General characteristics

- Crew: one
- Capacity: one passenger
- Empty weight: 390 kg (860 lb)
- Gross weight: 600 kg (1,323 lb)
- Powerplant: 1 × BMW 1200 four cylinder, four stroke automotive engine, 86 kW (115 hp)

Performance

- Maximum speed: 170 km/h (110 mph, 92 kn)
- Cruise speed: 150 km/h (93 mph, 81 kn)
