= Corvus Phantom =

Hungarian ultralight aircraft

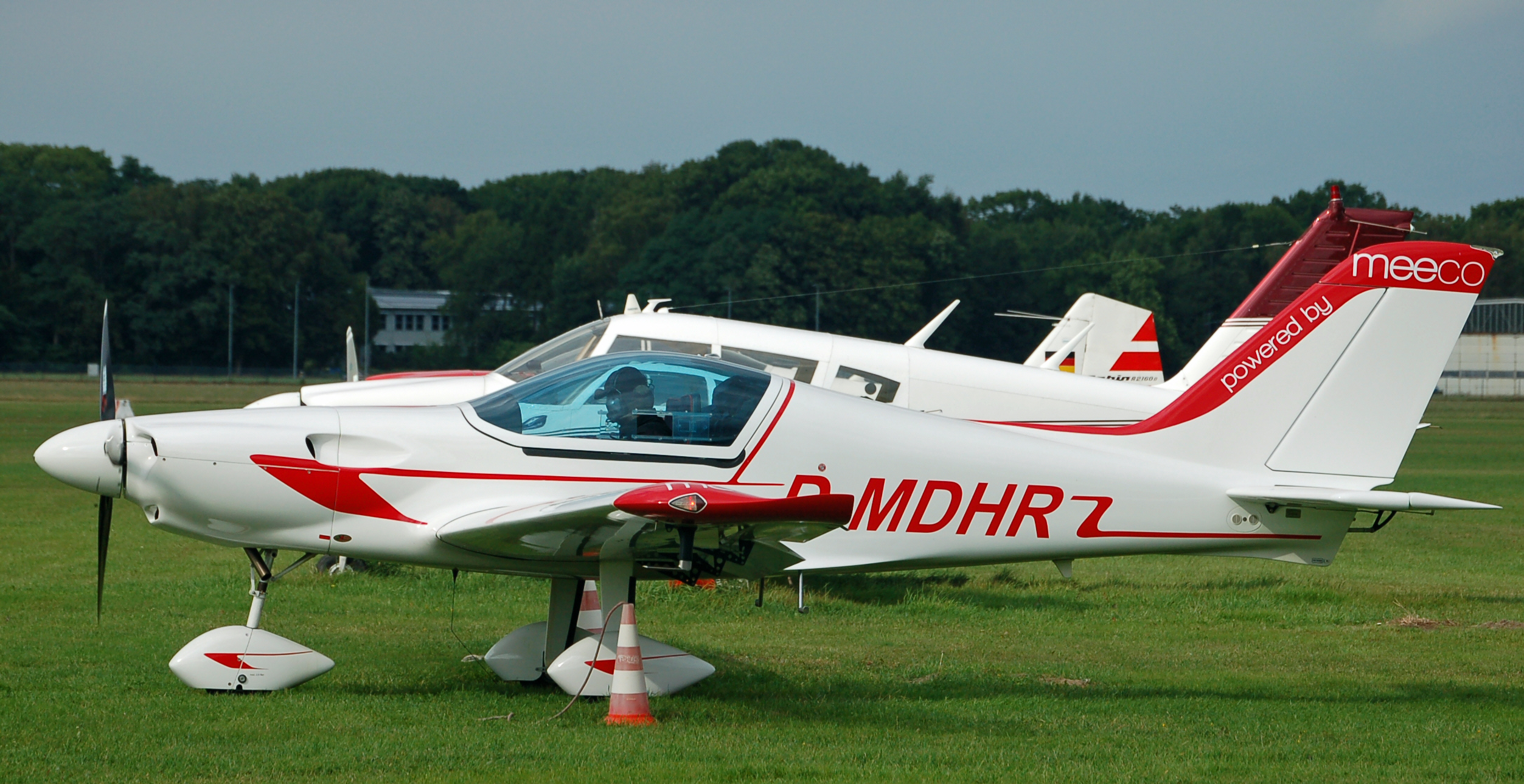

General information
- Type: Touring monoplane
- National origin: Hungary
- Manufacturer: Corvus Aircraft

History
- First flight: 2006

The Corvus Phantom is a Hungarian two-seat ultralight aircraft produced by Corvus Aircraft.

In the USA it is marketed as the Falcon LS, from 2008 until 2010 by T&T Aviation, since 2010 by Renegade Light Sport. In Germany the aircraft is called the Wild Angel and in the United Kingdom the Crusader.

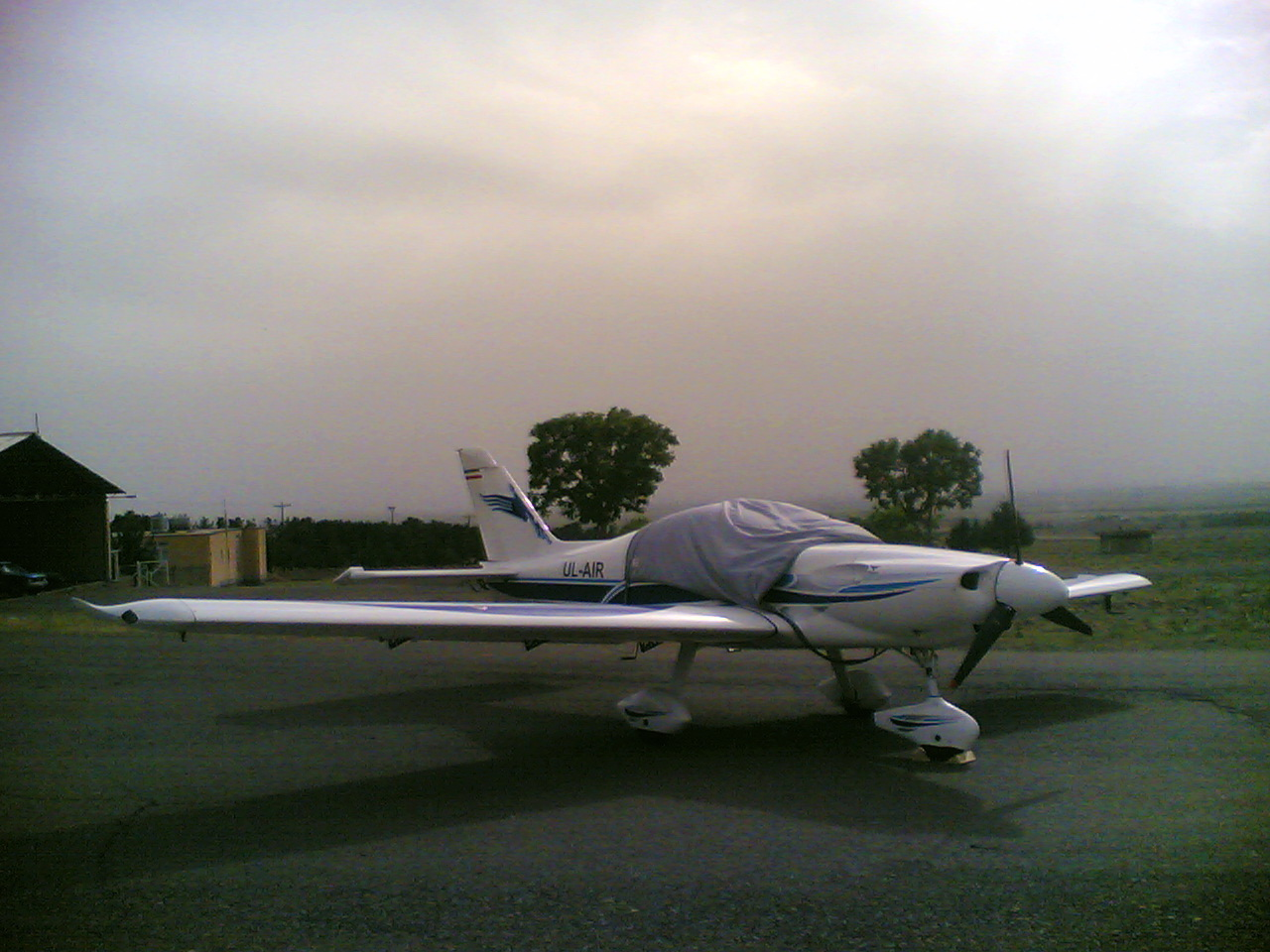
An Iranian registered Phantom

== Variants ==
Phantom UL
Production variant certified as an Ultralight.
Phantom RG
Variant with retractable landing gear.

== Specifications (Phantom UL) ==
Data from Corvus website

General characteristics

- Crew: 2
- Length: 6.52 m (21 ft 5 in)
- Wingspan: 9.6 m (31 ft 6 in)
- Height: 2.26 m (7 ft 5 in)
- Wing area: 11.4 m^{2} (123 sq ft)
- Max takeoff weight: 472.5 kg (1,042 lb)
- Powerplant: 1 × Rotax 912 ULS , 75 kW (100 hp)

Performance

- Maximum speed: 270 km/h (170 mph, 150 kn)
- Cruise speed: 180 km/h (110 mph, 97 kn)
- Range: 700 km (430 mi, 380 nmi)
- g limits: +4/-2
