= World Aircraft Surveyor =

Surveyor
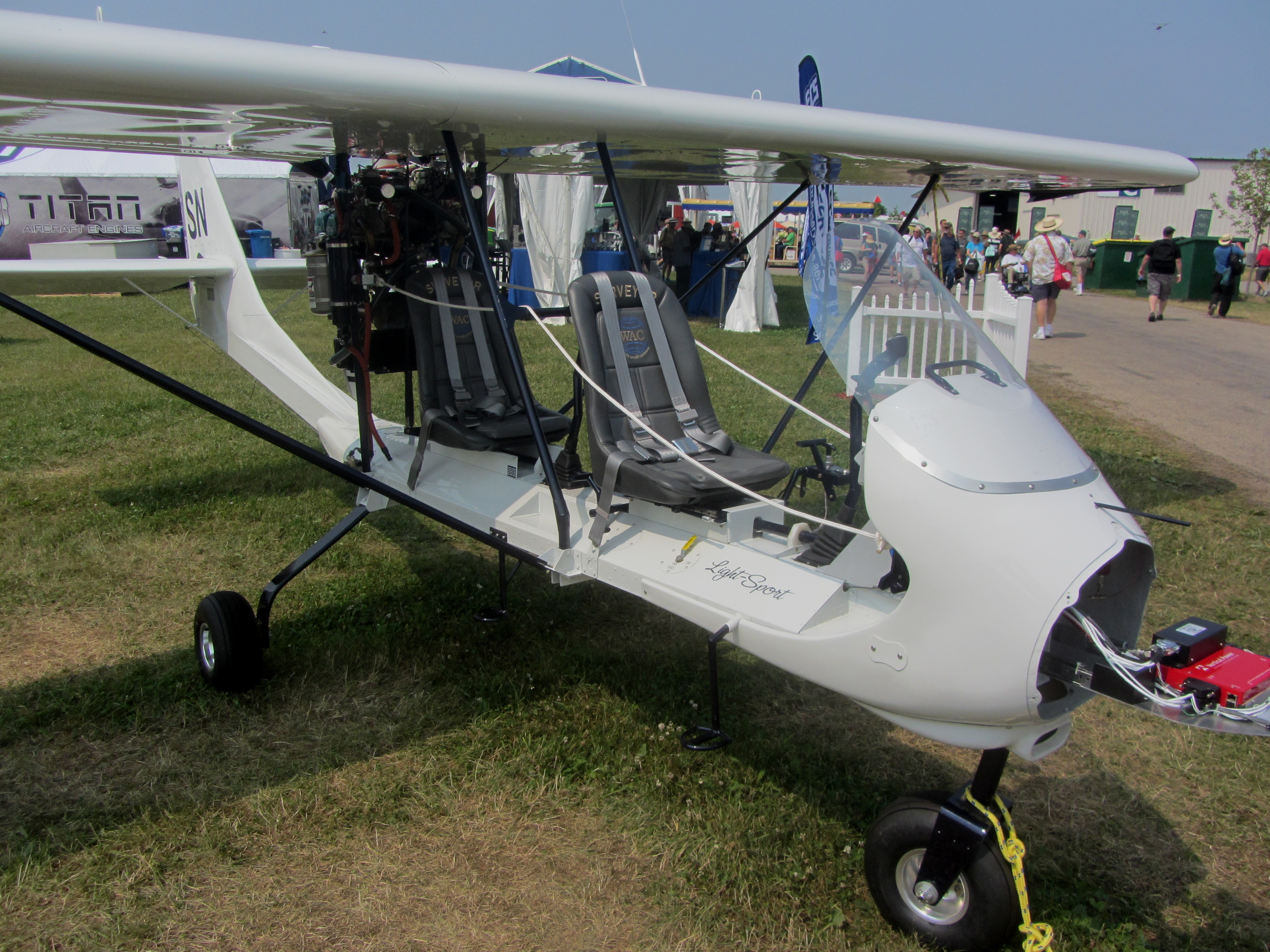
- Surveyor

General information
- Manufacturer: World Aircraft Company

History
- Introduction date: 2012

The World Aircraft Surveyor is a production all metal, two place, tricycle gear, high wing, open cockpit, pusher configuration light-sport aircraft.

== Specifications (Surveyor) ==
Data from World Aircraft

General characteristics

- Crew: 1
- Capacity: 1 passenger
- Length: 6.81 m (22 ft 4 in)
- Wingspan: 8.99 m (29 ft 6 in)
- Wing area: 12.78 m^{2} (137.6 sq ft)
- Empty weight: 306 kg (675 lb)
- Gross weight: 599 kg (1,320 lb)
- Fuel capacity: 28 U.S. gallons (110 L; 23 imp gal)
