= AMD/Eastman/Zenair Patriot =

Light sport aircraft produced by AMD Co. (later Eastman and Zenair)

AMD/Eastman/Zenair Patriot 150

General information
- Type: Light Sport Aircraft
- National origin: United States of America Republic of Colombia
- Manufacturer: Aircraft Manufacturing and Design AeroAndina
- Designer: Maximo Tadesco, Chris Heintz
- Status: Abandoned/Cancelled
- Number built: 4~

History
- Manufactured: 2006-2010
- Introduction date: 2007
- First flight: October 13, 2006
- Developed from: AeroAndina MXP-150 Kimbaya
- Variant: Eastman Patriot AMD Zenair Patriot 150

The AMD Patriot is a light sport aircraft formerly produced by Aircraft Manufacturing and Design Co. based on the AeroAndina MXP-150 Kimbaya. Little is known about the aircraft itself due to a paucity of available sources and images.

In August 2007, Aircraft Manufacturing and Design Co. announced that they intended to produce a brand-new light sport aircraft based on the AeroAndina MXP-150 Kimbaya, a high-wing, all metal, tricycle gear aircraft. Built to comply with the FAA's Light/Sport aircraft standards, the plane was fitted with a Continental O-200-A engine that drove a 2-bladed Sensenich propeller and was intended to compete with other light, recreational aircraft, including the upcoming Cessna Skycatcher, and to be manufactured in the United States.

A sole prototype was constructed and tested in 2006. According to a contemporary press release, the plane was designed with an "ideal trainer configuration", a "rugged construction" with an "all-new design" and "exceptionally low stall speed", intended to be priced at around $90,000 to $95,000 USD. It also featured wingtips with curved edges, intended to reduce the formation of air vortices at wing and stabilizer tips.

The first production model received its CofA in 2008. Reportedly, 2 planes, registered N145JD and N441PT, were produced. Production was halted in 2010 after AMD's rebranding to Eastman Aviation, and following its bankruptcy, AMD's assets, including the Patriot design, were sold to Zenair, the manufacturer of the Zenith series of kit aircraft. In a 2013 news article, AMD Sales Director John Degonia promoted it as the Zenair Patriot 150, and revealed that it was to be priced at $89,000 for the base model. However, no more aircraft were sold before production was finally ended for good after an internal restructuring to focus on Zenair's own in-house model line. It is unknown how many were sold, with sources reporting 2 registered in the United States and 2 built as kit planes in Colombia.

== Specifications ==
General characteristics

- Crew: 1
- Capacity: 1 passenger and 525 lb (238 kg) useful load
- Length: 20 ft 8 in (6.30 m)
- Wingspan: 32 ft 10 in (10.01 m)
- Height: 3 ft 9 in (1.14 m)
- Wing area: 132.5 sq ft (12.31 m^{2})
- Empty weight: 785 lb (356 kg)
- Max takeoff weight: 1,310 lb (594 kg)
- Powerplant: 1 × Continental O-200-A , 100 hp (75 kW)

Performance

- Cruise speed: 118 mph (190 km/h, 118 kn)
- Stall speed: 40 mph (65 km/h, 35 kn) flaps extended; 46 mph (74 km/h; 40 kn) flaps retracted
- Never exceed speed: 165 mph (265 km/h, 143 kn)
- Range: 647 mi (1,041 km, 562 nmi)
- Service ceiling: 12,000 ft (3,658 m)
- Rate of climb: 1,100 ft/min (5.6 m/s)

== See also ==
- AMD Alarus
