= Lycoming IO-233 =

IO-233
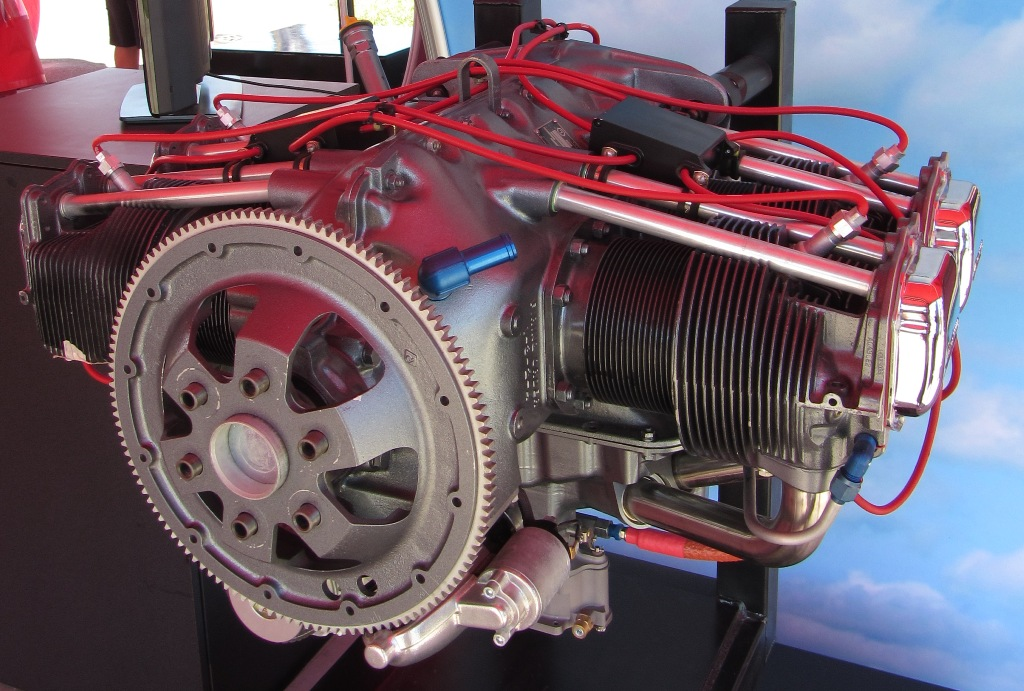
- IO-233-LSA light-sport aircraft engine.
- Type: Piston aero-engine
- National origin: United States
- Manufacturer: Lycoming Engines
- First run: 2008
- Major applications: Tecnam P92 Eaglet
- Manufactured: 2008-present
- Developed from: Lycoming O-235

The Lycoming IO-233 is a non-certified four-cylinder, air-cooled, horizontally opposed piston aircraft engine that produces between 100 hp (75 kW) and 116 hp (87 kW).

The IO-233 is a development of the Lycoming O-235, which is itself a derivative of the older Lycoming O-233 engine.

== Development ==
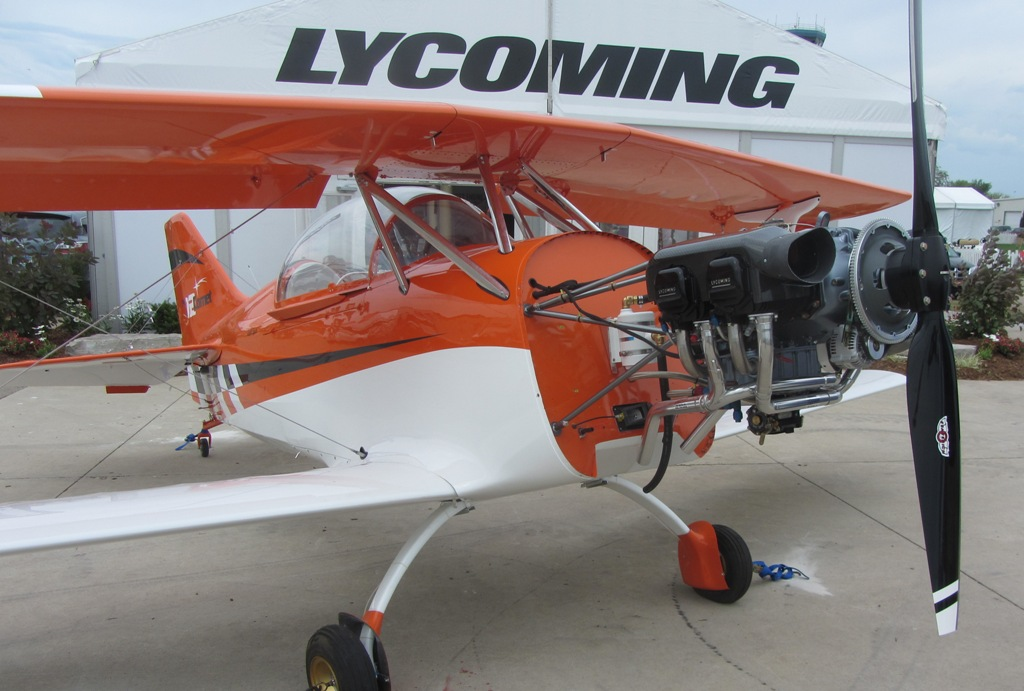
Lycoming IO-233 installation in a FK Comet

The IO-233 was announced by the company at AirVenture on 28 July 2008 as a new engine for light sport aircraft. The engine was conceived as a lightened version of the Lycoming O-235 by company engineers who were building their own kit LSAs and found that there was no powerplant that met their requirements for power output and weight, with the ability to burn either 100LL avgas or unleaded automotive fuel.

The resulting engine weighs less than the O-235 and incorporates a throttle body injector system with a tuned intake manifold and dual electronic ignition, or optionally a carburetor in place of the throttle body injector to save further cost and weight. The engine has a 2400-hour time between overhauls. Additional features include a lightweight 14 volt alternator, an optimized oil sump, a streamlined accessory housing, a lightweight starter and roller tappets.

When announced in July 2008 Lycoming expected the engine to be available later that year, once ASTM testing for LSA use was completed. The company also contemplated certifying the engine in 2009. There is no indication that certification has been completed.

At AirVenture 2011, the company announced that the engine was commencing volume production and was flying in both fuel-injected and carbureted versions.

Renegade Light Sport's Falcon LS was the first airplane to fly with Lycoming's new IO-233-LSA engine on 6 Oct 2010.

Renegade Light Sport is working with Lycoming to produce an aerobatic version of the IO-233-LSA engine to be designated as the AEIO-233. The design goals include fuel injection, an inverted sump and that it be capable of +9/-3 Gs.

== Variants ==
IO-233-LSA
Initial version, 100 hp (75 kW) at 2400 rpm to 116 hp (87 kW) at 2800 rpm

== Applications ==
- Aeris Naviter AN-2 Enara
- Dakota Cub Super 18
- Denney Kitfox
- Foxcon Terrier 200
- Renegade Falcon LS
- Tecnam P92
- World Aircraft Spirit

== Specifications (IO-233-LSA) ==
Data from Lycoming Specification Sheet

=== General characteristics ===
- Type: direct drive, four-cylinder, aircraft piston engine
- Bore: 4.375 in (111.1 mm)
- Stroke: 3.875 in (98.4 mm)
- Displacement: 233.3 in³ (3.82 L)
- Length: 26.968 in (685.0 mm)
- Width: 31.928 in (811.0 mm)
- Height: 20.571 in (522.5 mm)
- Dry weight: 200 lb (91 kg) to 210 lb (95 kg)

=== Components ===
- Valvetrain: Pushrod-actuated valves
- Fuel system: throttle body injector
- Fuel type: 100LL avgas or autofuel
- Oil system: dry sump
- Cooling system: air-cooled

=== Performance ===
- Power output: 100 hp (75 kW) at 2400 rpm, 116 hp (87 kW) at 2800 rpm
- Specific power: 0.43 hp/in³ (19.6 kW/L)
- Compression ratio: 8.1:1
- Fuel consumption: 5.25 USgal/h (19.9 L/h)
- Power-to-weight ratio: 0.50 hp/lb (0.82 kW/kg)
