= Corvus Hungary =

Hungarian aircraft manufacturer

Corvus Hungary LLC
- Company type: Privately held company
- Industry: Aerospace
- Founded: Aug 2011
- Headquarters: Hungary
- Key people: Chief Executive Engineer: Andras Voloscsuk
- Products: Light aircraft
- Number of employees: 35
- Website: corvus-hungary.com

Corvus Hungary LLC is an aircraft manufacturer that was founded in 2011 to produce the Corvus Fusion aircraft.

== History ==
Started in 2004, originally named Corvus Aircraft Ltd and based in Ballószög, Hungary, the company consisted of five employees including Managing Director Tamás Gecse and Chief Engineer Andras Voloscsuk. The company developed the Corvus Corone Mk 1 aircraft.

Corvus Aircraft began development of the ultralight Corvus Corone MK II in 2006 and had its first company presence at EAA AirVenture Oshkosh airshow in Oshkosh, Wisconsin, USA.

Corvus Aircraft debuted its Corvus Phantom aircraft in 2007. Corvus Aircraft also signed a contract with Red Bull for developing a new airplane, the Corvus Racer 540, for Péter Besenyei designed especially for air racing.

In August 2011, a new company Corvus Hungary LLC was formed, based in Hungary, to develop the Corvus Fusion aircraft.

In 2012 the company established a joint venture, called Corvus Aerospace (Suzhou) in Suzhou, China, to manufacturer parts and develop the Corvus Racer 312, a smaller version of the Corvus Racer 540 for the European microlight and American light sport aircraft categories. The new design first flew on 1 November 2013

== Aircraft ==
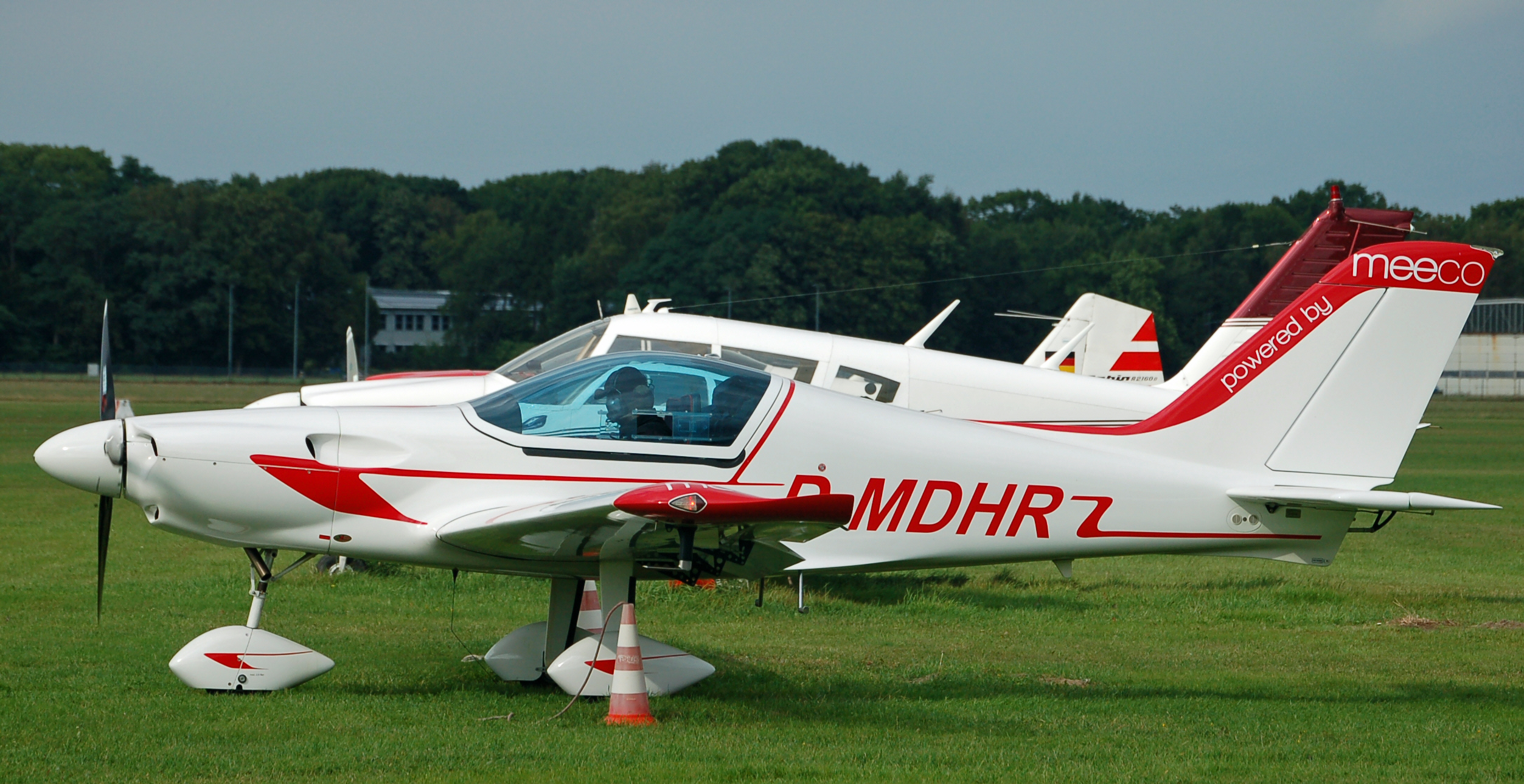
Corvus Phantom

Summary of aircraft built by Corvus Hungary LLC
| Model name | First flight | Number built | Type |
|---|---|---|---|
| Corvus Phantom | 2006 | | two-seat, ultralight aircraft |
| Corvus Racer 540 | 2010 | | low wing, high performance aerobatic aircraft |
| Corvus Racer 312 | 2013 | | low wing, high performance microlight aircraft |
| Corvus Fusion | 2012 | 1 | two-seat, low wing, light-sport aircraft |
