= Aero East Europe Sila =

Family of Serbian light aircraft

Sila
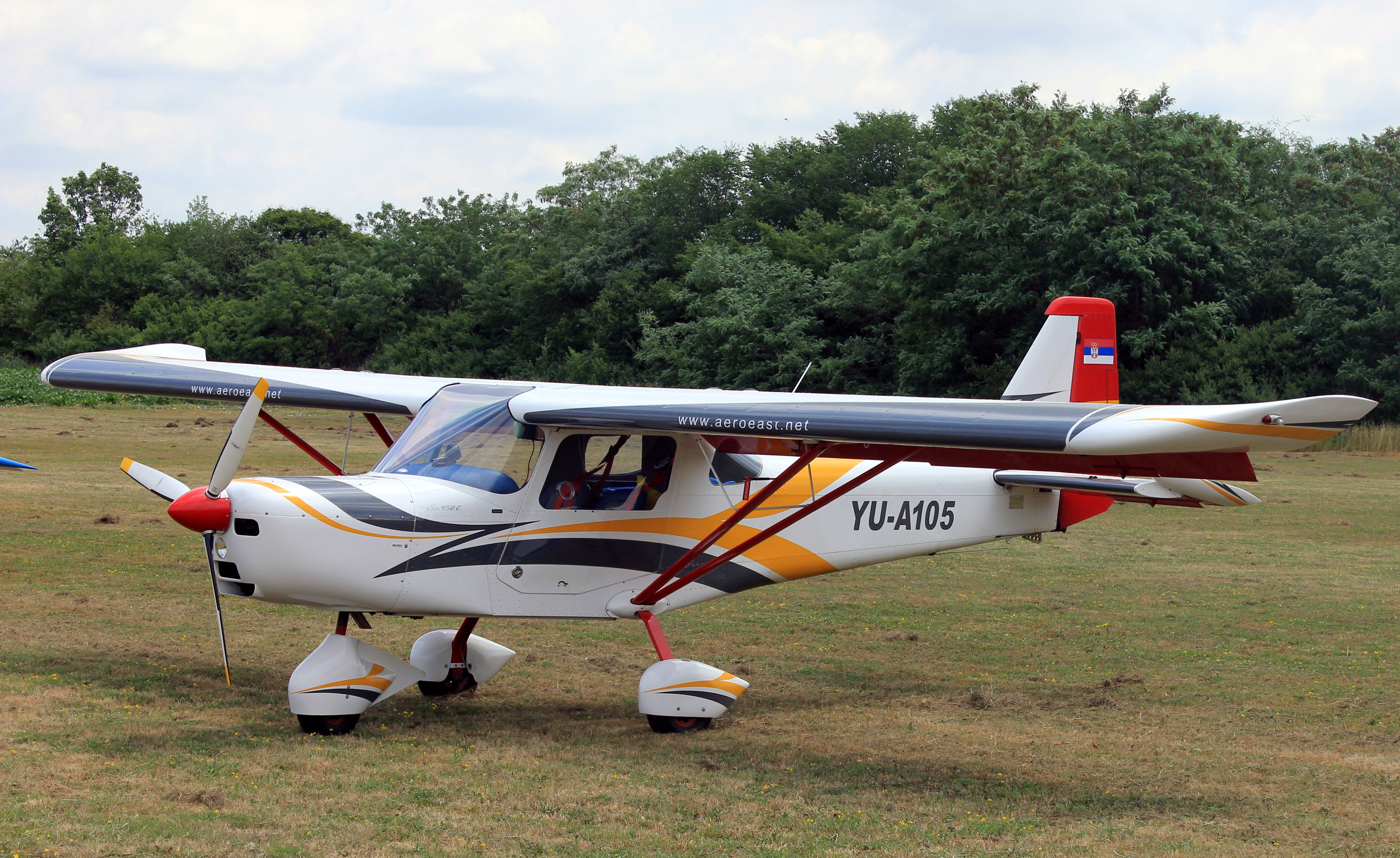

General information
- Type: Ultralight aircraft and light aircraft
- National origin: Serbia
- Manufacturer: Aero East Europe
- Status: In production (2016)

History
- Introduction date: 2013

The Aero East Europe Sila (English: force, power or strength and also short for Serbian industry light aircraft) is a family of Serbian ultralight and light aircraft, designed and produced by Aero East Europe of Kraljevo and later of Jagodina, introduced at the AERO Friedrichshafen show in 2013. The design is supplied complete and ready-to-fly.

== Design and development ==
The Sila 450 C was designed to comply with the Fédération Aéronautique Internationale microlight rules, while the larger aircraft in the family fit into the EASA CS-VLA category. All feature a V-strut-braced high-wing, an enclosed cabin, fixed tricycle landing gear and a single engine in tractor configuration.

== Operational history ==
Reviewer Marino Boric described the design in a 2015 review as "very robust".

== Variants ==
Sila 450 C
Two seat "Cruiser" model, with a semi-monocoque structure made from aluminium sheet and a maximum take-off weight of 450 kg (990 lb). Its 9.4 m (30.8 ft) span wing employs a NACA 5417 airfoil, has an area of 11.94 m^{2} (128.5 sq ft) and flaps. Standard engines available are the 80 hp (60 kW) Rotax 912UL, 100 hp (75 kW) Rotax 912ULS and the 115 hp (86 kW) Rotax 914 four-stroke powerplants. German LTF-UL and Serbian ultralight certified.
Sila 750 C
Two seat "Cruiser" model, with a semi-monocoque structure made from aluminium sheet and a maximum take-off weight of 750 kg (1,650 lb). Its 9.47 m (31.1 ft) span wing employs a NACA 5417 airfoil, has an area of 11.94 m^{2} (128.5 sq ft) and flaps. Standard engines available are the 100 hp (75 kW) Rotax 912ULS, the 115 hp (86 kW) Rotax 914 and the 160 hp (119 kW) Lycoming O-320 four-stroke powerplants. The aircraft is undergoing EASA CS-VLA and Serbian certification.
Sila 750 S
Two seat STOL model with full-span Junkers flaperons and a maximum take-off weight of 750 kg (1,650 lb).
Sila 750 MT
Three seat Medical Transport model, with a semi-monocoque structure made from aluminium sheet and steel tubing and a maximum take-off weight of 750 kg (1,650 lb). Its 10 m (32.8 ft) span wing employs a NACA 65-018 airfoil, full-span Junkers flaperons, has an area of 14.30 m^{2} (153.9 sq ft). Standard engines available are the 100 hp (75 kW) Rotax 912ULS, the 115 hp (86 kW) Rotax 914 and the 160 hp (119 kW) Lycoming O-320 four-stroke powerplants. The aircraft is undergoing EASA VLA and Serbian certification.
Sila 950
Four seat model, with a maximum take-off weight of 950 kg (2,090 lb). Standard engines available are the 115 hp (86 kW) Rotax 914 and the 160 hp (119 kW) Lycoming O-320 four-stroke powerplants. The aircraft is no longer advertised on the company website.

== Specifications (Sila 450 C) ==
Data from Tacke

General characteristics

- Crew: one
- Capacity: one passenger
- Wingspan: 9.4 m (30 ft 10 in)
- Wing area: 11.94 m^{2} (128.5 sq ft)
- Airfoil: NACA 5417
- Empty weight: 291 kg (642 lb)
- Gross weight: 472.5 kg (1,042 lb)
- Fuel capacity: 100 litres (22 imp gal; 26 US gal)
- Powerplant: 1 × Rotax 912ULS four cylinder, liquid and air-cooled, four stroke aircraft engine, 75 kW (101 hp)
- Propellers: 2-bladed composite

Performance

- Maximum speed: 220 km/h (140 mph, 120 kn)
- Cruise speed: 190 km/h (120 mph, 100 kn)
- Stall speed: 65 km/h (40 mph, 35 kn)
- Rate of climb: 5.6 m/s (1,100 ft/min)
- Wing loading: 39.57 kg/m^{2} (8.10 lb/sq ft)
