= AeroAndina MXP-1000 Tayrona =

MXP-1000 Tayrona

General information
- Type: Two seat ultralight
- National origin: Colombia
- Manufacturer: AeroAndina
- Number built: more than 26

History
- First flight: c.2005
- Developed from: Aeroandinas MXP-800 Fantasy

The Aeroandina MXP-1000 Tayrona is a single engine, high wing, two seat sports light, based on the Zenair formula, developed in Colombia by AeroAndina. It was launched in 2005.

== Design and development ==
The MXP-1000 Tayrona, named after a Colombian National Park is a development of the MXP-800 Fantasy, itself a development of Aeroandina's Zenair CH 701-based MXP-740/750 series of high wing, side-by-side configuration ultralights. It is mostly constructed from aluminium alloy, with a steel cage around the cockpit which is under the wing and cutaway at the rear. The constant chord wing is braced to the lower fuselage with pairs of V-form, faired lift struts assisted by jury struts. The first four Tayronas had flaperons but all later aircraft have flaps. The leading edge slats of earlier MXP models have been abandoned to increase cruising speed. The angular fin and rudder has sweep on its leading edge and the tailplane, set on top of the fuselage, is also swept.

The Tayrona has a tricycle undercarriage, with cantilever aluminium spring legs for the mainwheels and a steerable nosewheel with rubber springing. The wheels may bespatted. There is a choice between three flat-four Rotax engines, the 58.8 kW (78.9 hp) Rotax 912UL, the 73.5 kW (98.5 hp) Rotax 912ULS or the 84.6 kW (113.4 hp) Rotax 914 ULS Turbo.

== Operational history ==
Sales to Europe began in 2005 and by mid-2010 there were 26 on the civil aircraft registers of European countries excluding Russia. In the United States, AMD planned to adapt the design to military use as the AMD (now Zenair) MXP-150 Patriot but this was not proceeded with.

== Specifications ==
Data from Jane's All the World's Aircraft 2011/12

General characteristics

- Crew: one
- Capacity: one passenger
- Length: 6.30 m (20 ft 8 in)
- Wingspan: 10.00 m (32 ft 10 in)
- Height: 2.40 m (7 ft 10 in)
- Wing area: 12.23 m^{2} (131.6 sq ft) gross
- Empty weight: 290 kg (639 lb)
- Max takeoff weight: 640 kg (1,411 lb)
- Fuel capacity: 92 L(24.3 US gal; 20.2 Imp Gal))
- Powerplant: × Rotax 914 ULS Turbo , 84.6 kW (113.5 hp)
- Propellers: 2-bladed ground adjustable pitch

Performance

- Maximum speed: 200 km/h (120 mph, 110 kn)
- Cruise speed: 190 km/h (120 mph, 100 kn) at 75% power
- Stall speed: 56 km/h (35 mph, 30 kn) flaps down
- Never exceed speed: 230 km/h (140 mph, 120 kn)
- Range: 1,046 km (650 mi, 565 nmi) at 75% power
- Service ceiling: 3,660 m (12,010 ft)
- g limits: +6/-3
- Rate of climb: 5.6 m/s (1,100 ft/min) maximum at sea level
- Take-off run: 35 m (115 ft)
- Landing run: 60 m (200 ft)
