= Corvus Racer 540 =

Hungarian racing aircraft

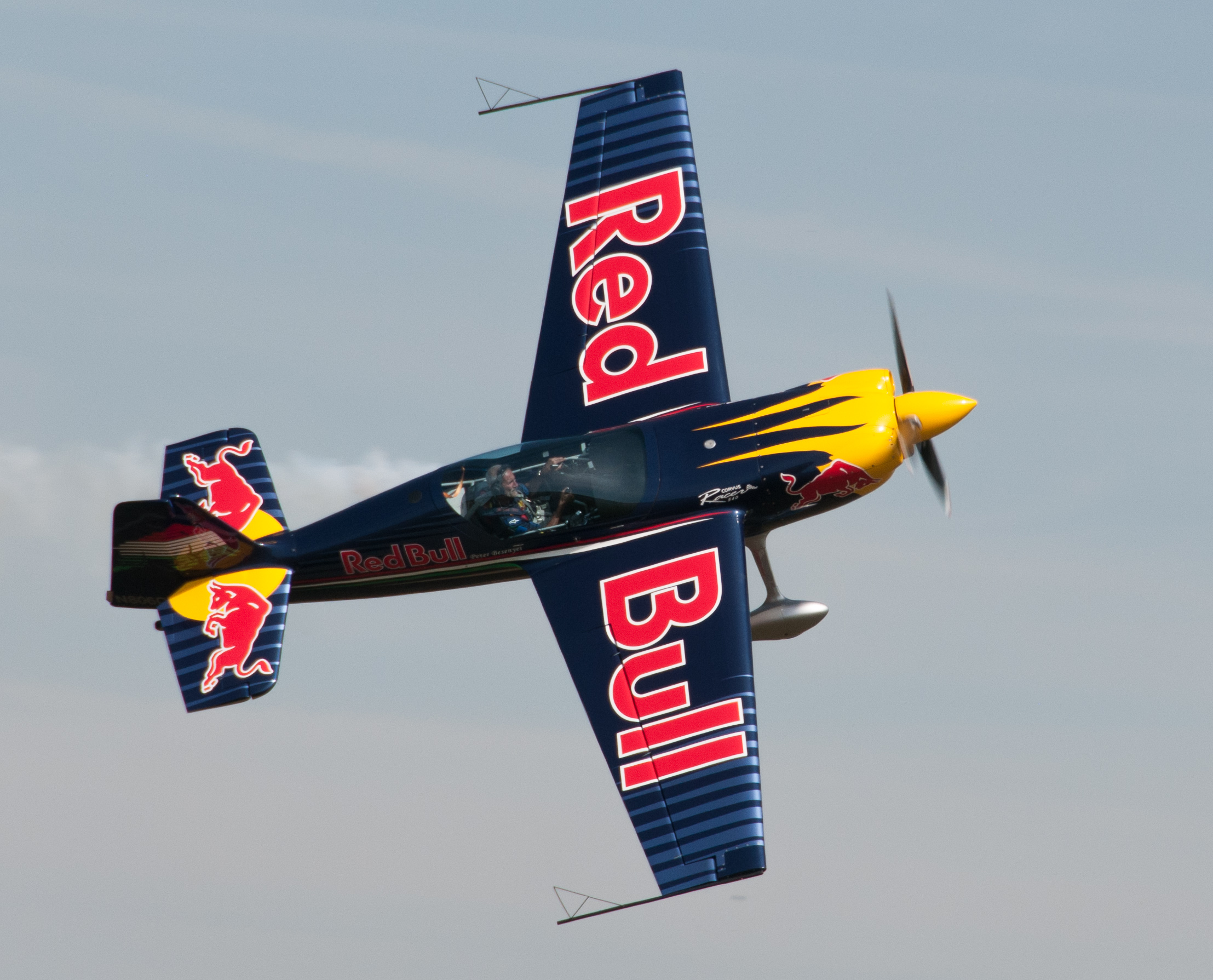
- Corvus Racer 540 at CIAF 2012

General information
- Type: Aerobatic monoplane
- National origin: Hungary
- Manufacturer: Corvus Aircraft
- Primary user: Péter Besenyei
- Number built: 1

History
- First flight: Feb 2010

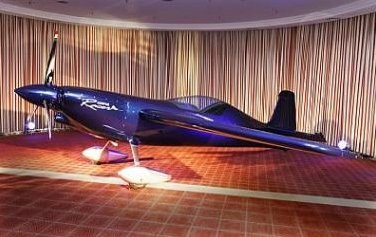
Corvus Racer 540

The Corvus Racer 540 is a single-seat, low wing, high performance aerobatic aircraft produced by Corvus Aircraft Ltd in Hungary.

== Design and development ==
The Corvus Racer 540 design was started in 2007 when Corvus Aircraft signed a contract with Red Bull to develop a new airplane for Péter Besenyei, designed especially for air racing. It was designed by Andras Voloscsuk and the Hungarian University of Aviation. After limited success improving the power output of the existing engine, Besenyei decided to focus on the airframe to reduce drag and improve aerodynamic efficiency. The development engineering time was more than 15,000 hours over two years, and the result was an airplane that was "very nice, nice to control" although potentially hindered by a heavy engine.

The Corvus Racer 540 first appeared at the Apr 2009 AERO Friedrichshafen show in Germany, with initial flight testing in Feb 2010 and its racing debut in June 2010 at the Red Bull Air Race in Windsor, Ontario, Canada during the fourth race out of six in the 2010 Red Bull racing season. Besenyei placed 10th at Windsor, 8th at New York, and 9th at Lausitz all with the Corvus Racer 540. Unfortunately, the 7th and 8th races of the 2010 race series were cancelled and as of April 2012 the series had yet to resume, thus reducing motivation for further development of the design.

== Specifications ==
Data from Corvus Aircraft website

General characteristics

- Crew: 1
- Length: 21 ft 6.7 in (6.571 m)
- Wingspan: 24 ft 3 in (7.4 m)
- Height: 8 ft 2 in (2.5 m)
- Gross weight: 1,510 lb (685 kg)
- Fuel capacity: 130 liters (29 imp gal; 34 U.S. gal)
- Powerplant: 1 × Lycoming AEIO-540 6-cyl air-cooled horizontally-opposed piston engine, 325 hp (242 kW)
- Propellers: 3-bladed MTV-9-B

Performance

- Cruise speed: 190 mph (310 km/h, 170 kn)
- Never exceed speed: 280 mph (450 km/h, 240 kn)
- g limits: +14/-14

== See also ==
- List of aerobatic aircraft
