= AeroAndina MXP-158 Embera =

Colombian ultralight aircraft

MXP-158 Embera

General information
- Type: Ultralight aircraft
- National origin: Colombia
- Manufacturer: AeroAndina
- Status: Production completed

History
- Developed from: AeroAndina MXP-150 Kimbaya

The AeroAndina MXP-158 Embera is a Colombian ultralight aircraft that was designed and produced by AeroAndina of Cali. The aircraft was available ready-to fly.

The MXP-158 is no longer in production.

== Design and development ==
The aircraft was designed to comply with the Fédération Aéronautique Internationale microlight rules and is noted for its robust design and ability to handle rough field operations. It features a strut-braced high-wing, a two-seats-in-side-by-side configuration enclosed cockpit, tricycle landing gear and a single engine in tractor configuration.

The aircraft is made from aluminum sheet. Its 9.5 m (31.2 ft) span wing is supported by V-struts and jury struts. The standard engine available was the 80 hp (60 kW) Rotax 912UL four-stroke powerplant.

== Specifications (MXP-158 Embera) ==
Data from Bayerl

General characteristics

- Crew: one
- Capacity: one passenger
- Wing area: 11.7 m^{2} (126 sq ft)
- Empty weight: 279 kg (615 lb)
- Gross weight: 472.5 kg (1,042 lb)
- Fuel capacity: 87 litres (19 imp gal; 23 US gal)
- Powerplant: 1 × Rotax 912UL four cylinder, liquid and air-cooled, four stroke, 60 kW (80 hp)
- Propellers: 3-bladed composite

Performance

- Maximum speed: 190 km/h (120 mph, 100 kn)
- Cruise speed: 175 km/h (109 mph, 94 kn)
- Stall speed: 54 km/h (34 mph, 29 kn)
- Rate of climb: 5.2 m/s (1,020 ft/min)
