= Kluz PS-11 =

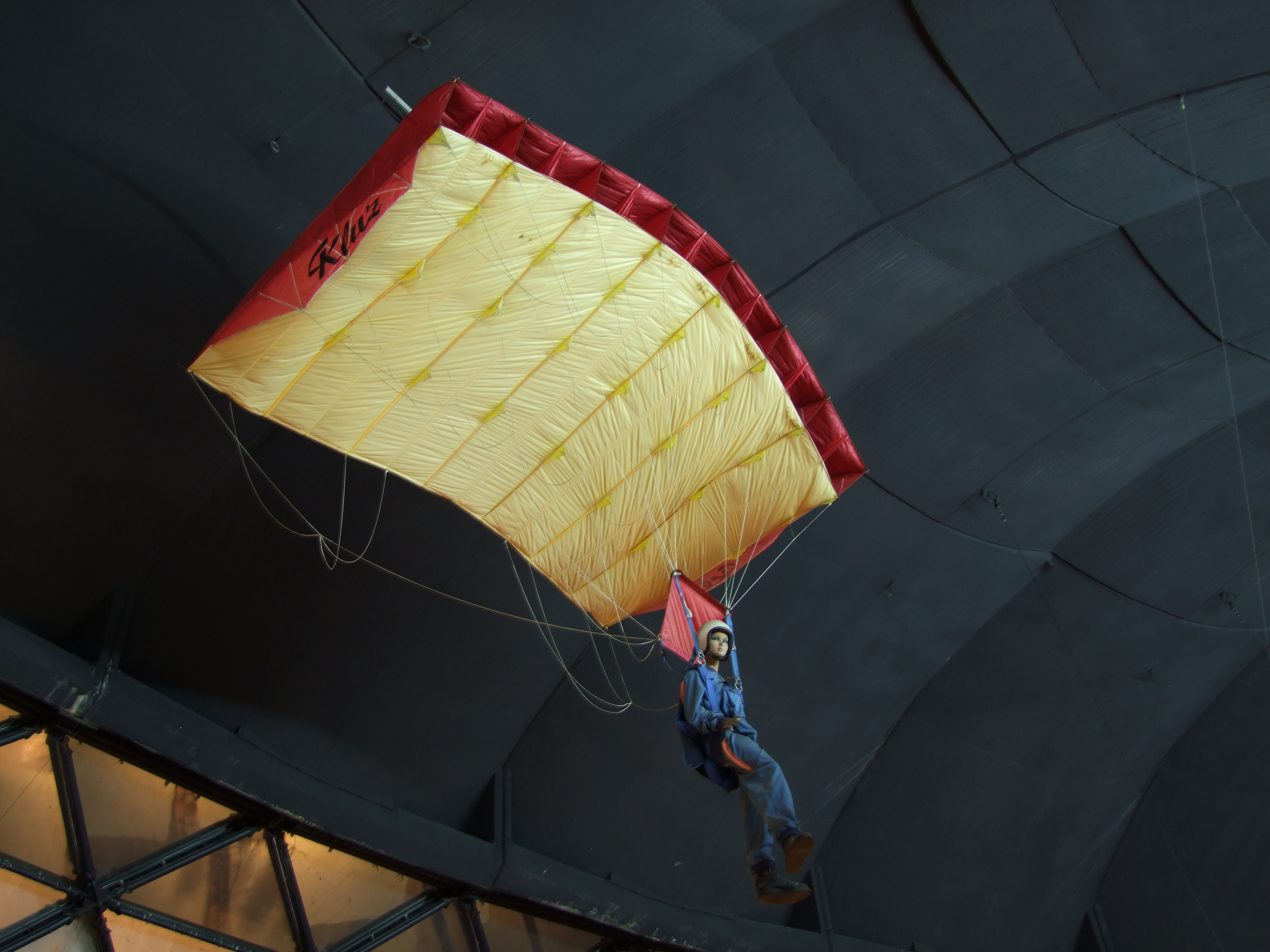
Kluz PS-11

Kluz PS-11 (Serbian Cyrillic:Клуз ПС-11) is sport parachute of the Rogallo wing type. Its weight is 10 kilograms (22 lb) and its span is 6.16 metres (20.2 ft). It was originally produced in the Franjo Kluz factory in Inđija, but production was moved to Belgrade in 1951.

== Description ==
In 1933 the Yugoslav air force called for bids for a parachute to meet Yugoslav aviation needs. After a one-year experimental stage, the factory of Knebl and Ditrich in Inđija started production of parachutes under licence from the American producer Irwin. It was at the time the most modern parachute in the world. The PS-11 was produced in three types: sitting (for pilots), wing (for scouts), and back (for parachuters). Until 1941, the Knebl and Ditrich factory manufactured around 2,500 parachutes of different types.

== Production ==
Production resumed in 1947 after World War II, in the nationalized factory of Franjo Kluz. In 1951 the factory was moved to Belgrade. Until the 1990s, Kluz produced around 44,000 parachutes (sport, pilot, school, and descent). Around 80 per cent were for export, especially to the USSR.

== Usage ==
- Yugoslavia
- Soviet Union

== Sources ==
- Клуз ПС-11 (падобран) (in Serbian)
