= AeroAndina MXP-150 Kimbaya =

Small Colombian aircraft

MXP-150 Kimbaya

General information
- Type: Light-sport aircraft
- National origin: Colombia
- Manufacturer: AeroAndina
- Designer: Maximo Tedesco
- Status: Production completed
- Number built: ~20

History
- Variant: AeroAndina MXP-158 Embera AMD/Eastman/Zenair Patriot

The AeroAndina MXP-150 Kimbaya is a Colombian light-sport aircraft that was designed and produced by AeroAndina of Cali. It also formed the basis for the AMD Patriot aircraft, a version of the MXP-150 with a Continental O-200 driving a dual-bladed propeller.

The MXP-150 is no longer in production.

== Design and development ==
The aircraft was designed to comply with the US light-sport aircraft rules, although it was never certified in that category. It features a strut-braced high-wing, a two-seats-in-side-by-side configuration enclosed cockpit, tricycle landing gear and a single engine in tractor configuration.

The aircraft is made from aluminum sheet. Its 10.0 m (32.8 ft) span wing is supported by V-struts and jury struts. Standard engines available were the 100 hp (75 kW) Rotax 912ULS four-stroke and a 125 hp (93 kW) Continental Motors, Inc. four-stroke powerplant.

== Specifications (MXP-150 Kimbaya) ==
Data from Bayerl

General characteristics

- Crew: one
- Capacity: one passenger
- Wing area: 12.3 m^{2} (132 sq ft)
- Empty weight: 375 kg (827 lb)
- Gross weight: 600 kg (1,323 lb)
- Fuel capacity: 92 litres (20 imp gal; 24 US gal)
- Powerplant: 1 × Continental Motors, Inc. four cylinder, air-cooled, four stroke, 93 kW (125 hp)

Performance

- Maximum speed: 210 km/h (130 mph, 110 kn)
- Cruise speed: 200 km/h (120 mph, 110 kn)
- Stall speed: 56 km/h (35 mph, 30 kn)
- Rate of climb: 6.2 m/s (1,220 ft/min)
