= AeroAndina =

Colombian aircraft manufacturer owned by Grupo Corbeta

AKT Aero
- Company type: Private company
- Traded as: AKT Aero
- Industry: Aerospace
- Founded: 1971
- Headquarters: Cali, Colombia
- Key people: Maximo Tedesco, founder and chairman.
- Products: Autogyros; Helicopters; Ultralight aircraft
- Parent: Grupo Corbeta
- Website: www.wacsa-aero.com

AeroAndina S.A. (now called WACSA Aero since 2014 and later AKT Aero in 2022) is a Colombian aircraft manufacturer based in Cali. The company was founded in 1971 as Agrocopteros Ltda to produce gyroplanes and later helicopters and biplanes. In 1998 the name was changed to Tecnologias Aeronauticas S.A. and it was known as Aerotec S.A.. The company was liquidated in the early 2000s and reformed under its present name.

The company now specializes in the design and manufacture of ultralight aircraft and light-sport aircraft. During its history the company has produced 440 aircraft.

== Aircraft ==
Summary of aircraft built by AeroAndina
Model name	First flight	Number built	Type
AeroAndina Autogyro	1971	8	Agricultural autogyro
AeroAndina Scamp	1977	7	Agricultural aircraft
Rotorway Exec	1982	6	helicopter, built under licence
Goldwing Ltd Goldwing	1980	12	ultralight aircraft
Zenair CH 301 Zenith			low-wing light aircraft, built under licence
AeroAndina MXP-100 Aventura			high-wing, tandem-seat, open cockpit light aircraft
AeroAndina MXP-150 Kimbaya			high-wing light aircraft
AeroAndina MXP-158 Embera			high-wing light aircraft
AeroAndina MXP-640 Amigo			low-wing light aircraft
AeroAndina MXP-650 Amigo-S			low-wing light aircraft
AeroAndina MXP-740 Savannah			high-wing STOL light aircraft
AeroAndina MXP-740-F			high-wing agricultural aircraft
AeroAndina MXP-800 Fantasy-Calima	2002		high-wing light aircraft
AeroAndina MXP-1000 Tayrona	2005		high-wing light aircraft
