= Ray Community Airport =

Public use airport in Ray, Michigan

- IATA: none; ICAO: none; FAA LID: 57D

Summary
- Owner: MACOMB AIRWAYS, INC
- Built: 1955
- Time zone: UTC−05:00 (-5)
  - Summer (DST): UTC−04:00 (-4)
- Elevation AMSL: 632 ft (193 m)
- Coordinates: 42°44′14″N 082°53′23″W
- Interactive map of Ray Community Airport

Runways
Direction	Length		Surface
Direction	ft	m	Surface
10/28	2,495	760	Asphalt

Statistics (2021)
- Aircraft movements: 25,915

Ray Community Airport (FAA LID: 57D) is a privately owned, public use airport located in Ray Township, Macomb County. Michigan. The airport sits on 93 acres of land at an elevation of 632 feet.

The airport is a regular home for events hosted by the experimental aircraft association. The local has been operating at Ray Community Airport for nearly 70 years as of 2023. Of special note are the numerous EAA Young Eagles events at the airport.

== History ==
Ray Community Airport was built in 1955. A chapter of the Experimental Aircraft Association built the airport's single hangar soon after in order to maintain the airport more thoroughly.

== Facilities and aircraft ==
The airport has two runways, both of which are at least partially paved. Runway 10/28 measures 2495 x 60 ft (760 x 18 m) and is completely paved, while runway 1/19 measures 2202 x 123 ft (671 x 37 m) and is a mix of asphalt and turf.

The airport has a fixed-base operator, which offers fuel as well as a conference room and crew lounge.

Based on the 12-month period ending December 31, 2021, the airport averages 25,915 aircraft operations per year, an average of 71 per day. It is entirely general aviation. For the same time period, 104 aircraft are based on the field: 100 single-engine airplanes, 2 ultralights, 1 multi-engine airplane, and 1 helicopter.

== Accidents and incidents ==
- On June 11, 2005, a Cessna 310C was destroyed on impact with terrain and fire after takeoff from the Ray Community Airport. The private pilot and flight instructor onboard had flown to Ray to test the aircraft. After the flight, the private pilot decided to fly the airplane. The flight instructor had problems starting the plane's engine but eventually succeeded in doing so. After takeoff, the instructor checked the airspeed indicator and it read about 10 knots above the best single-engine rate of climb airspeed, and the vertical airspeed indicator read a climb of 700 to 1,000 feet per minute. He stated that the left wing "dipped" and that he could not remember anything after this point in the flight. Both pilots onboard mentioned a left engine failure in their reports. The probable cause of the accident was found to be the crew's failure to maintain aircraft control following a loss of power on the left engine.
- On March 29, 2006, an amateur-built Martin Rans S-7 Courier was destroyed by fire following a forced landing subsequent to a loss of engine power. The airplane was on initial climb after takeoff from the Ray Community Airport. The pilot reported that the aircraft's engine failed 25 above the ground. He stated that he landed the airplane and then exited and walked around the airplane. He stated that when he came to the nose area of the airplane, flames were emanating from the cowl. He stated that he moved to a safe distance and the airplane was subsequently consumed by the fire. The engine failure and fire could not be determined.
- On February 4, 2012, a Pipistrel Virus 912 motorglider was substantially damaged during a forced landing following a loss of engine power shortly after takeoff from Ray Community Airport. A witness reported that the motorglider engine did not sound as if it was operating normally during the preflight run-up. He added that the engine sounded as if it was "missing" during takeoff, and it subsequently quit when the aircraft was about 200 feet above ground level (agl) after takeoff. The probable cause of the accident was found to be a loss of engine power due to fuel starvation for reasons that could not be determined because the postaccident examination of the airframe and engine did not reveal any anomalies that would have precluded normal operation.
- On July 6, 2012, a Grumman American Aviation AA-5A struck deer during its landing roll at the airport.
- On July 3, 2013, a Cessna 182 Skylane made an emergency landing soon after departure from Ray Community Airport. The aircraft experienced engine issues while on a test flight for a flying club that had just purchased the aircraft.
- On June 29, 2021, an unspecified incident occurred at the airport.
- On October 15, 2015, a Comp Air Inc. (Plambeck) CA8 experimental airplane was substantially damaged while landing at Ray Community Airport. The pilot reported that, shortly after extending full flaps on short final, the left wing dropped. The pilot attempted to correct the left wing drop with right aileron and rudder; however, the airplane did not respond. The pilot elected to go around and increased engine power. The airplane pitched up and the left turn steepened. The pilot subsequently reduced engine power and with the resulting descent prepared for an impact with the ground. The airplane struck the ground short of the runway and the left wing separated from the fuselage. The engine continued to run for about 15 minutes following the accident. The probable cause of the accident was the pilot's improper use of the trim, which created a cross-controlled situation and resulted in an aerodynamic stall during the attempted go-around.
- On May 27, 2017, a Piper PA-28 impacted trees, terrain, and a tractor near Ray Township, Michigan while landing at the Ray Community Airport. On his first attempt to land, he was high on the approach and elected to go around. On the second landing attempt, the pilot said he was long. He said he applied throttle and lost consciousness. Witnesses reported that the pilot made several landing attempts, but each time the airplane was too fast or too high to land. On the last attempt, the airplane touched down fast about halfway down the 2,495' runway. The airplane skipped, floated, and impacted the runway nose gear first about 1/4 the distance from the end, breaking the nose gear. The probable cause of the accident was found to be the pilot's failure to maintain a proper approach speed, which resulted in a hard landing and a runway excursion.
- On July 24, 2022, a Beechcraft A36 Bonanza crashed during takeoff at Ray Community Airport. All onboard survived. The pilot reported the aircraft's engine lost power just after liftoff when he was about 100 feet above the ground. He attempted to land at an area just off the end of the runway.

== See also ==
- List of airports in Michigan
