= CA-12 =

CA-12 or CA12 may refer to:

- CAC Boomerang, an Australian fighter aircraft
- California's 12th congressional district
- California State Route 12, a highway in California
- Carbonic anhydrase 12, encoded by the CA12 gene
- Comp Air 12, an American civil utility aircraft
- USS Charlotte (CA-12)
- Yui Station, a railway station in Shizuoka, Japan (station code: CA12)
