= 2007 Reali Táxi Aéreo Learjet 35 crash =

2007 business jet crash in São Paulo, Brazil

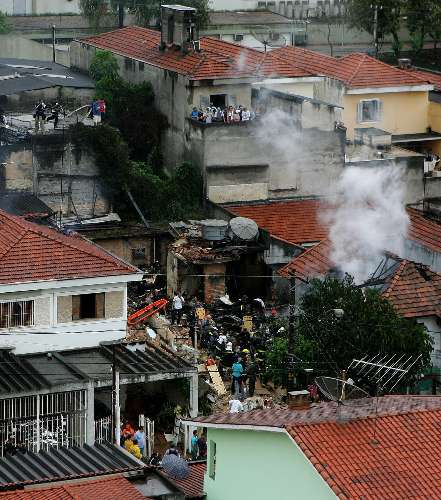
- The wreckage of the Learjet 35A

Accident
- Date: 4 November 2007
- Summary: Loss of control after takeoff due to pilot error
- Site: Near Campo de Marte Airport, São Paulo, Brazil; 23°30′02″S 46°38′40″W
- Total fatalities: 8
- Total survivors: 0

Aircraft
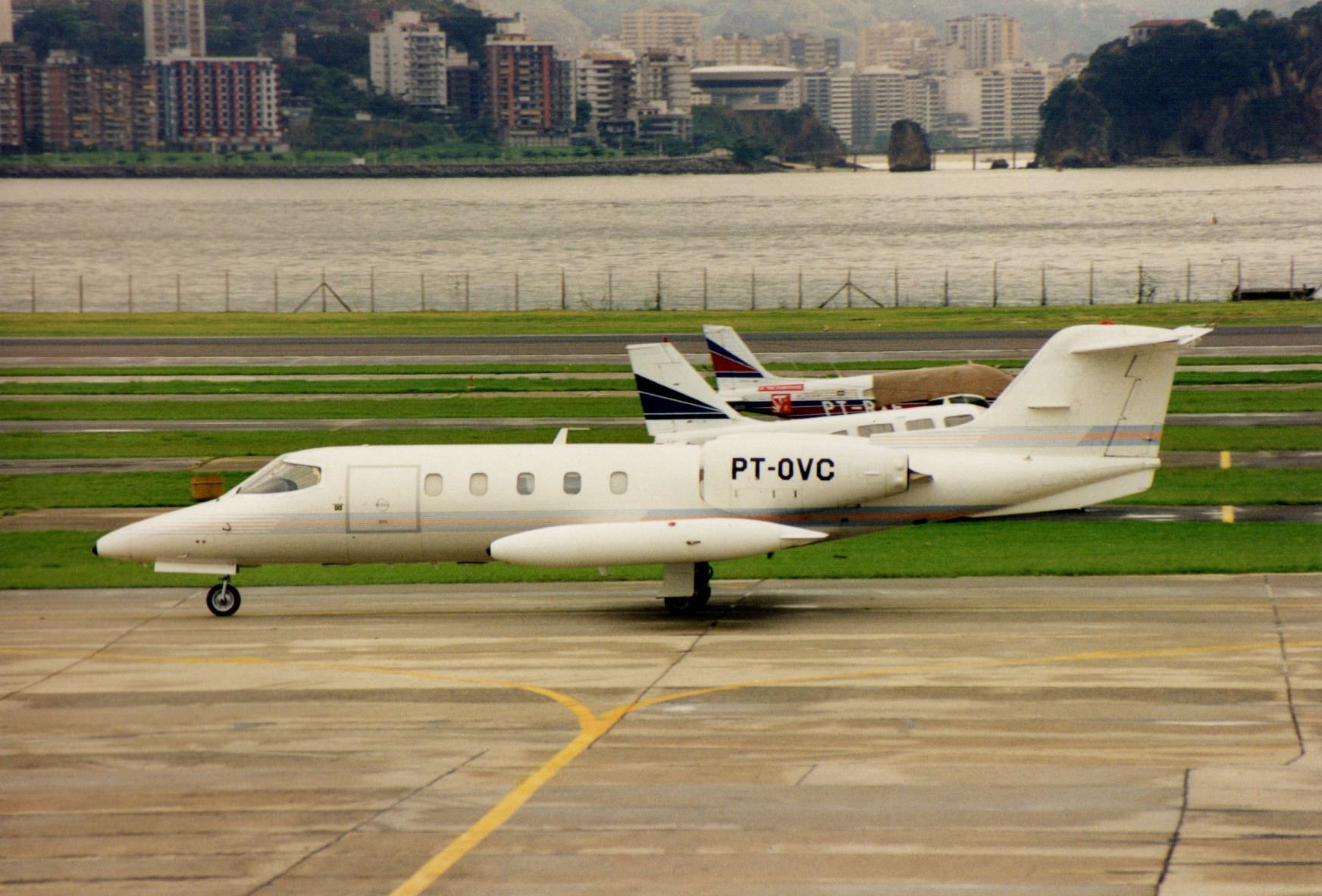
- PT-OVC, the aircraft involved in the accident, photographed in 1998
- Aircraft type: Learjet 35A
- Operator: Reali Táxi Aéreo
- Registration: PT-OVC
- Flight origin: Campo de Marte Airport, São Paulo, Brazil
- Destination: Santos Dumont Airport, Rio de Janeiro, Brazil
- Occupants: 2
- Passengers: 0
- Crew: 2
- Fatalities: 2
- Survivors: 0

Ground casualties
- Ground fatalities: 6
- Ground injuries: 2-6

The 2007 Reali Táxi Aéreo Learjet 35 crash was a fatal aviation accident involving a business jet operated by Brazilian charter airline Reali Táxi Aéreo. On 4 November 2007, a Learjet 35A aircraft registered as PT-OVC crashed shortly after takeoff from Campo de Marte Airport in São Paulo, Brazil. Both crew members on board were killed, along with six people on the ground. Reali Táxi Aéreo was among the first companies in Brazil to be certified for aeromedical evacuation operations.

== Background ==
=== Aircraft ===
The aircraft involved was a Learjet 35A, registered PT-OVC and operated by Reali Táxi Aéreo Ltda. It was manufactured in 1981 by Bombardier and bore the serial number 35A-399. At the time of the accident in November 2007, the aircraft was 26 years old and had accumulated a total of 10,583 airframe hours.

=== Crew ===
The captain, Paulo Roberto Montezuma Firmino, aged 39, was a highly experienced pilot with over 10,000 total flight hours, including approximately 3,750 hours on the Learjet 35A. He held an Airline Transport Pilot License and had also served as an instructor on the aircraft type.

The first officer, Alberto Soares Júnior, aged 24, had logged 643 total flight hours, including 125 hours on type. He was a recent graduate in Aeronautical Sciences and was undergoing training on the Learjet 35A, which was his first jet aircraft. He had previously overcome a rare form of rib cancer five months prior to the accident and was engaged to be married.

=== Casualties ===
The grounds fatalities were consist of family members which also include infant. Meanwhile 11 and 16-year-old survive with slightly injuries

== Accident ==
On 3 November 2007, a Learjet 35A operated by Reali Táxi Aéreo crashed into a residential neighborhood in São Paulo, Brazil, shortly after departing from Campo de Marte Airport. The aircraft was en route to Santos Dumont Airport in Rio de Janeiro and carried two crew members. Both pilots died in the crash, along with six people on the ground; several homes were also damaged or destroyed.

Shortly after takeoff, the aircraft began a left turn at low altitude and subsequently entered a steep descent. Witnesses reported that the Learjet hit the roof of a house before impacting another, leading to a fireball that engulfed several buildings. According to reports, just seconds before impact, the first officer was heard screaming, "No, no, no, man!" as the aircraft descended toward a group of homes. Earlier in the flight, the captain had requested, "Fix that fuel for me," as the aircraft climbed away from the airport.

A reconstruction of the timeline by Poder Aéreo citing forensic investigators indicated that the flight crew failed to follow standard fuel management procedures prior to takeoff. An imbalance in the fuel tanks resulted in asymmetric thrust and loss of aerodynamic stability shortly after liftoff. As the aircraft veered left and began to stall, the captain reportedly exclaimed, "What did you do!?" before the jet struck the rooftops and exploded.

== Investigation ==
The Brazilian Aeronautical Accidents Investigation and Prevention Center (CENIPA) concluded that the accident was caused by a loss of control shortly after takeoff due to a fuel imbalance, which led to asymmetric thrust and aerodynamic instability. The pilots failed to complete a standard checklist verifying fuel distribution, resulting in uncoordinated flight control inputs during the climb-out phase.

The probable cause of the accident was stated as follows:

Loss of control in flight due to asymmetric fuel distribution that adversely affected the aircraft's balance, compounded by inadequate crew coordination and omission of checklist procedures.

The contributing factors were identified as:

- Omission of the pre-flight checklist item related to fuel balancing, a critical safety step.
- The commander assuming multiple tasks, resulting in poor distribution of cockpit responsibilities.
- Excessive confidence in routine operations, which led to procedural shortcuts.
- Loss of situational awareness due to distractions and lack of effective crew coordination.
- Improper pitch control after takeoff, leading to an excessive nose-up attitude and aerodynamic stall.

Additional findings were reported by other investigators:

- A 2009 technical report noted that the aircraft had a severe imbalance of over 400 liters of fuel between the wing tanks at the time of takeoff.
- A timeline reconstruction indicated that the aircraft banked left within 20 seconds after departure. The first officer was heard panicking, and the captain questioned the aircraft's control response moments before the crash.
- A contemporaneous news article stated that CENIPA ruled out any mechanical failure and confirmed pilot error as the primary factor.

== See also ==
- Noar Linhas Aéreas Flight 4896 – a 2011 fatal domestic crash in Brazil involving a small regional airline
- TAM Transportes Aéreos Regionais Flight 402 – 1996 crash caused by uncommanded thrust reverser deployment shortly after takeoff from São Paulo
- TAM Airlines Flight 3054 – 2007 runway overrun at Congonhas Airport involving a major Brazilian airline
