= Comp Air 9 =

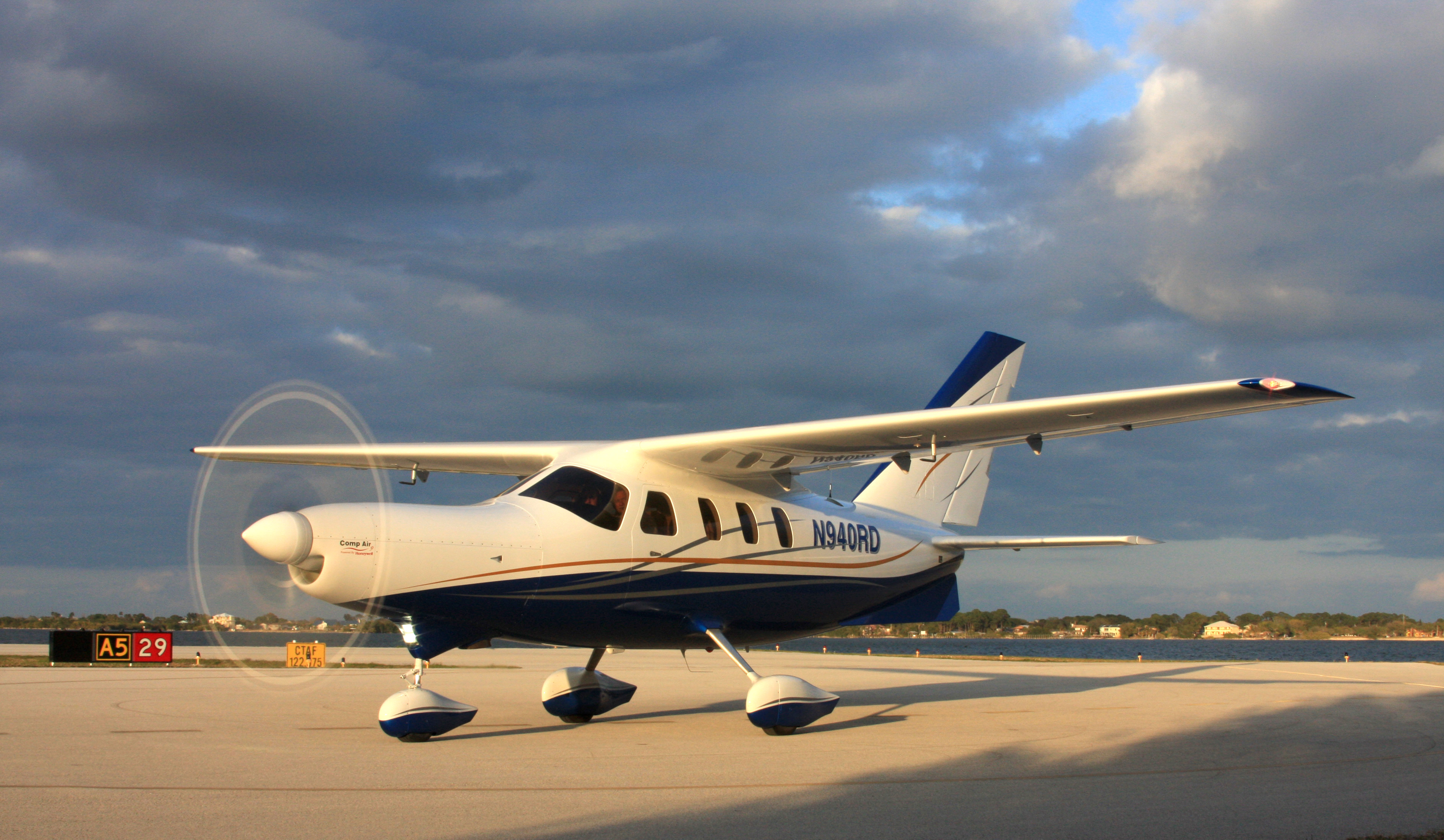

General information
- Type: Amateur-built aircraft
- National origin: United States
- Manufacturer: Comp Air
- Status: In production (2012)

The Comp Air 9 is a turboprop, high-wing, cantilever monoplane with tricycle landing gear produced as a kit for amateur construction by Comp Air.

== Design and development ==
The aircraft is built from carbon fiber and is powered by a Honeywell TPE331-10 turboprop powerplant of 1,000 hp (746 kW) or similar engine.

== Operational history ==
In 2011 there was one Comp Air 9 reported as having been completed. By August 2022, the US Federal Aviation Administration reported none registered. The factory prototype had been registered in 2008 and de-registered in 2018 as its registry had expired and was not renewed. There is at least one example flying in Brazil using the PR-ZJM registration.

== Accidents and incidents ==
- On 19 March 2016, a Comp Air 9 owned by Brazilian entrepreneur and former Vale SA CEO Roger Agnelli crashed shortly after takeoff from Campo de Marte Airport, São Paulo, and exploded on impact, killing all seven on board, including Agnelli and injuring one bystander on the ground. During the investigation of the crash, it was found that during the assembly process of the PR-ZRA, changes were incorporated to the original design that directly affected the take-off performance of the aircraft.

== Specifications (typical Comp Air 9) ==
Data from Bayerl and Comp Air

General characteristics

- Crew: one
- Capacity: five
- Length: 38 ft (12 m)
- Wingspan: 43 ft (13 m)
- Wing area: 260 sq ft (24 m^{2})
- Aspect ratio: 6:1
- Empty weight: 4,300 lb (1,950 kg)
- Gross weight: 7,700 lb (3,493 kg)
- Fuel capacity: 300 U.S. gallons (1,100 L; 250 imp gal)
- Powerplant: 1 × Honeywell TPE331-10 or -12 turboprop aircraft engine, 1,000 hp (750 kW)
- Propellers: 4-bladed Hartzell constant speed, reversible propeller

Performance

- Cruise speed: 250 kn (290 mph, 460 km/h)
- Stall speed: 58 kn (67 mph, 107 km/h)
- Range: 1,500 nmi (1,700 mi, 2,800 km)
- g limits: +4.3/-1.5
- Rate of climb: 2,800 ft/min (14 m/s) at gross weight
- Wing loading: 29 lb/sq ft (140 kg/m^{2})
