= Comp Air 8 =

American light aircraft

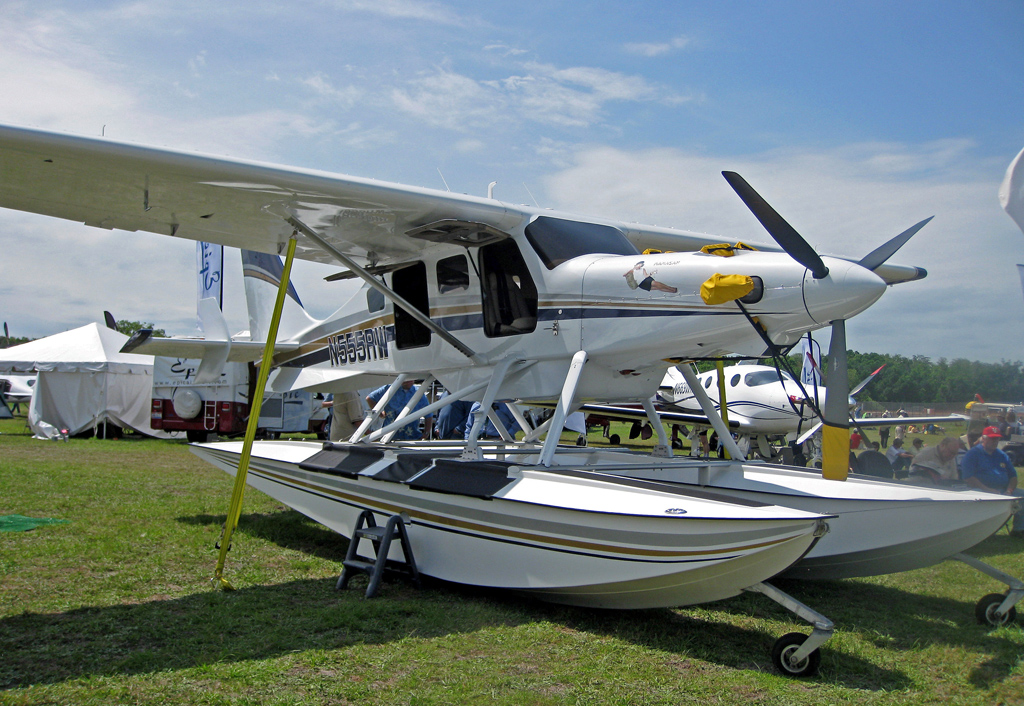
- Comp Air 8 on amphibious floats

General information
- Type: Kit built light civil utility aircraft
- National origin: United States
- Manufacturer: Comp Air
- Status: Production completed
- Number built: 25 (2011)

History
- Manufactured: 2000-2021

The Comp Air 8 is an American kit turboprop-powered light civil utility aircraft that was manufactured by Comp Air of Florida from about 2000 until 2021.

The aircraft's webpage was removed in 2021 and the new company website does not list it as being in production in 2022.

== Design and development ==
The aircraft is a Comp Air 7 with its fuselage stretched by 2 feet (0.6 m) to accommodate six adults and two children. The Comp Air 8 is configured as a conventional high-wing monoplane with optional tailwheel or tricycle undercarriage. It can be fitted with large floats for water operations.

The Comp Air 8 fuselage and tail are constructed with carbon fiber. Fuel capacity can be determined by the builder and can be as much as 180 U.S. gallons (680 L; 150 imp gal). The useful load is 2,000 to 2,500 lb (907 to 1,134 kg) and the aircraft has a standard gross weight of 4,800 lb (2,177 kg). The gross weight can be increased to 5,200 lb (2,359 kg) or even 5,600 lb (2,540 kg) with factory-supplied reinforcing kits. The standard engine used is the Walter M 601D of 657 hp (490 kW)

Kit production seems to have ended in 2021.

== Operational history ==
In August 2022 there were seven Comp Air 8s registered in the United States with the Federal Aviation Administration.

== Specifications (Comp Air 8) ==
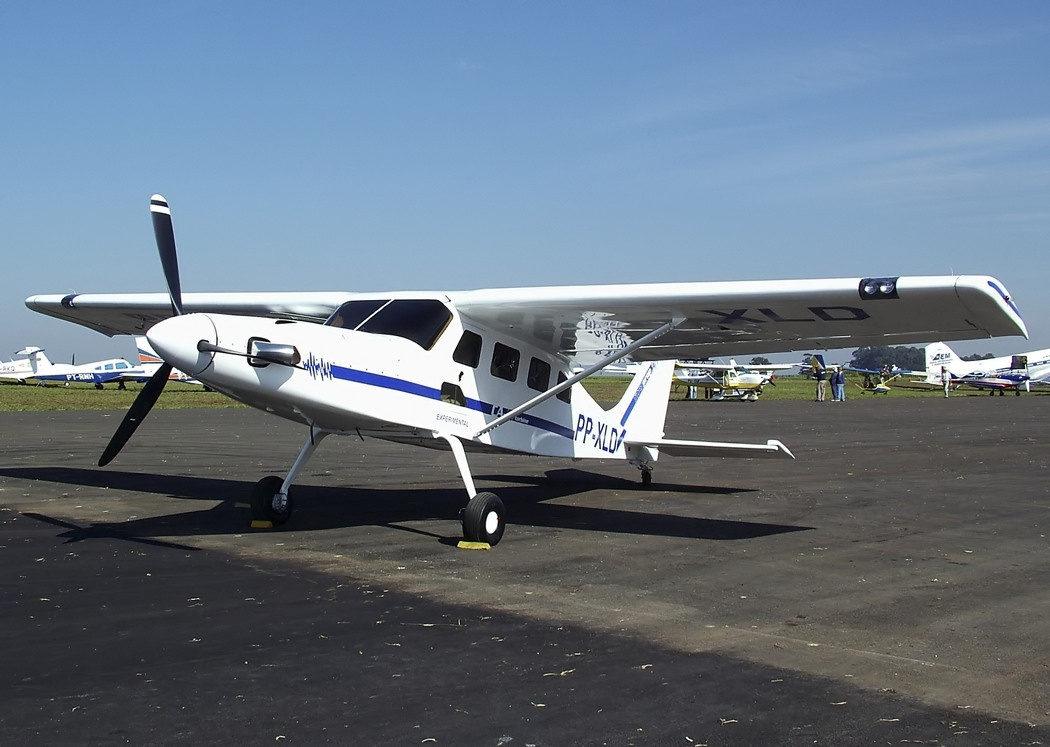
Comp Air 8 with conventional landing gear

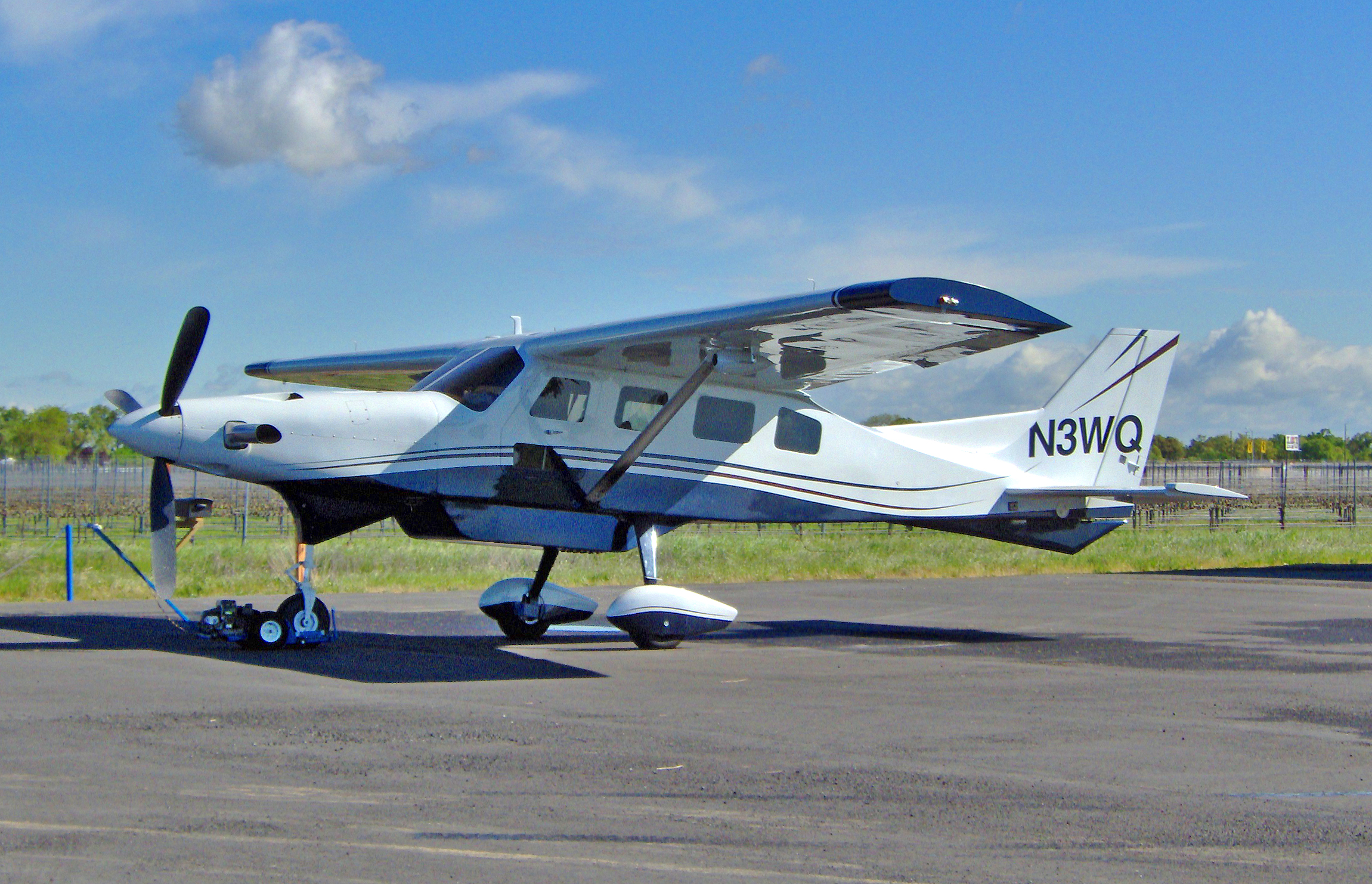
Comp Air 8 with tricycle landing gear

Data from Comp Air

General characteristics

- Crew: one
- Capacity: seven passengers
- Length: 31 ft 6 in (9.60 m)
- Wingspan: 33 ft 0 in (10.06 m)
- Height: 9 ft 0 in (2.74 m)
- Wing area: 237 sq ft (22.0 m^{2})
- Empty weight: 2,800 lb (1,270 kg)
- Gross weight: 4,800 lb (2,177 kg)
- Max takeoff weight: 5,600 lb (2,540 kg) with gross weight increase kit
- Fuel capacity: 150 US gallons (568 litres)
- Powerplant: 1 × Walter M 601D turboprop, 657 shp (490 kW)
- Propellers: 3-bladed AVIA constant speed, feathering, with reverse

Performance

- Cruise speed: 225 mph (362 km/h, 196 kn) True airspeed
- Never exceed speed: 229 mph (369 km/h, 199 kn) Indicated airspeed
- Fuel consumption: 35-37 US gallons per hour fuel burn (133-140 L/h)
