= Roger Agnelli =

Brazilian investment banker (1959–2016)

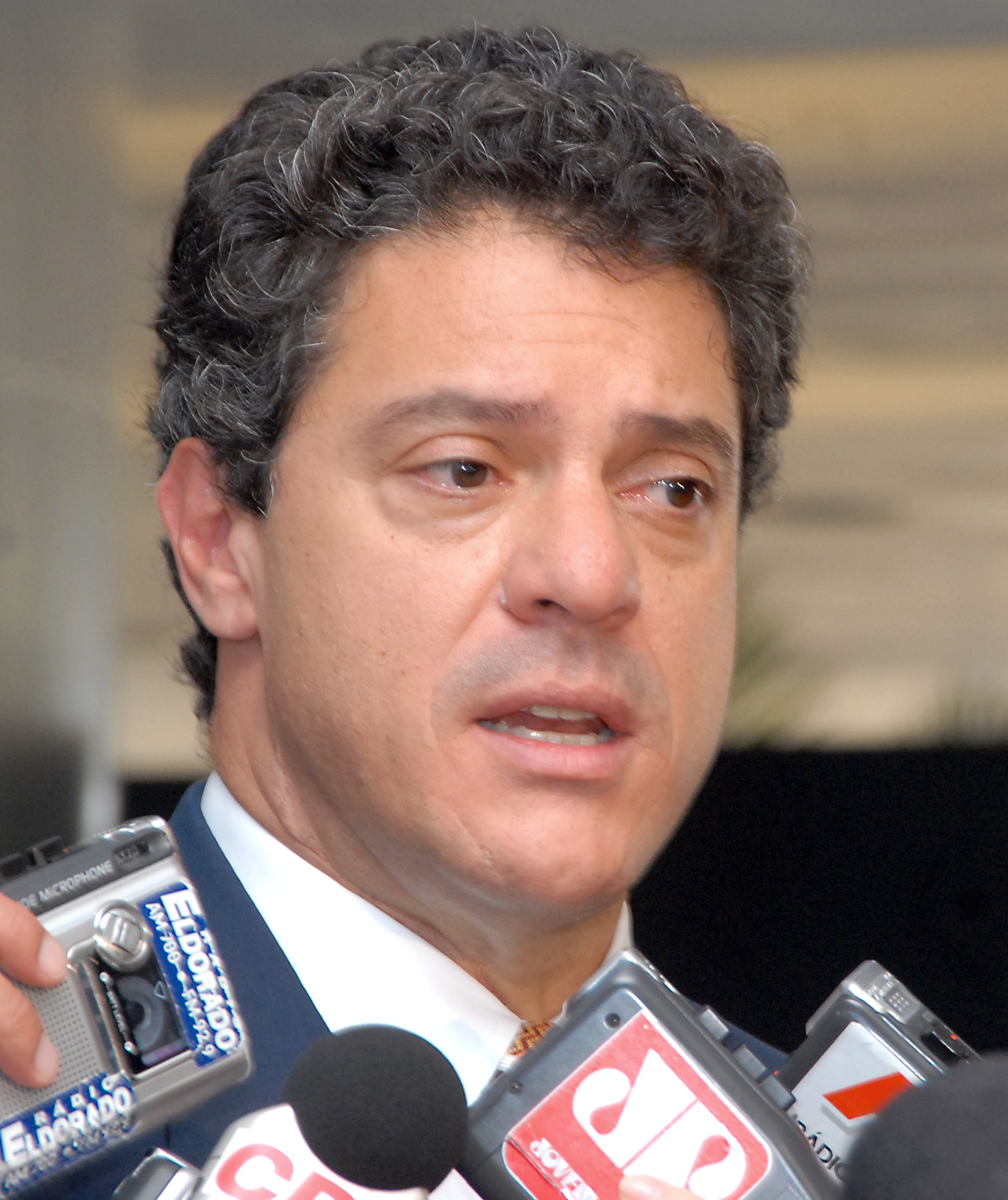
- Agnelli in 2007
- Born: May 3, 1959; São Paulo, Brazil
- Died: March 19, 2016 (aged 56); São Paulo, Brazil
- Education: Fundação Armando Alvares Penteado
- Occupation: Investment banker
- Spouse: Andréia
- Children: 2

Roger Agnelli (May 3, 1959 – March 19, 2016) was a Brazilian investment banker and entrepreneur. He ran one of the largest mining companies in the world, Vale SA, and in 2013 was voted by Harvard Business Review as the world's fourth best-performing chief executive officer behind Apple Inc. CEO Steve Jobs, Jeff Bezos of Amazon.com and Yun Jong-Yong of Samsung. His clashes with Brazil's ruling Workers Party leadership, that began with the 2008 financial crisis and his firing of 2,000 workers, led to his ouster from Vale SA at the government's request in 2011. On March 19, 2016, he was killed, along with his wife, son, and daughter (and three others) when their plane crashed in São Paulo, Brazil.

== Early life, education and family ==
Agnelli was born May 3, 1959, in São Paulo, Brazil, hailing from a lower-middle-class family of Italian origin (unrelated to the Agnellis who founded and ran Fiat) and in 1981 graduated with a degree in economics from Fundação Armando Alvares Penteado (commonly referred to as FAAP).

He was married to Andréia and they had two children, daughter Ana Carolina and son João.

== Business career ==
From 1981 to 1997, Agnelli held various positions at Banco Bradesco and became its executive director in 1998, the position he held until his leaving the bank in 2000.

In 2000–2001, Agnelli was the president and CEO of the Brazilian holding company Bradespar that was founded by Banco Bradesco in order to allow the bank to spin off some of its industrial investments.

Also in 2000–2001, Agnelli was the chairman of the board of directors Vale SA, where, in 2001, he was named its president and CEO, the position he held until his ouster in 2011.

From 2012 to his 2016 death, Agnelli was the founding partner and CEO of the private Brazilian holding group AGN Holding.

== Ouster from Vale amid clashes with Brazilian government ==
In March 2011, while Agnelli was president and CEO of Vale SA, it was reported that this Brazilian mining giant was considering taking a 9% stake in the controversial Belo Monte Dam hydroelectric project, also known as the Amazon dam project.

Barely two weeks after this announcement, Agnelli was voted out of office at the request of Brazil's government and replaced as CEO by long-time Vale SA executive Murilo Ferreira, who was more friendly to the ruling Workers Party and described as being an acquaintance of Brazilian president Dilma Rousseff.

Agnelli had previously clashed with former Brazilian president Luiz Inácio Lula da Silva after his firing of 2,000 workers during the 2008 financial crisis, and had, also, accused members of Lula's Workers Party of trying to install loyalists at Vale SA and seek a bigger say in key decisions.

== Death ==
Agnelli, along with his wife and two children, were among seven killed when their Comp Air 9 plane crashed into two homes on March 19, 2016, minutes after taking off from Campo de Marte Airport in northern São Paulo while traveling to a wedding in Rio de Janeiro.
