= Comp Air 3 =

Kit aircraft

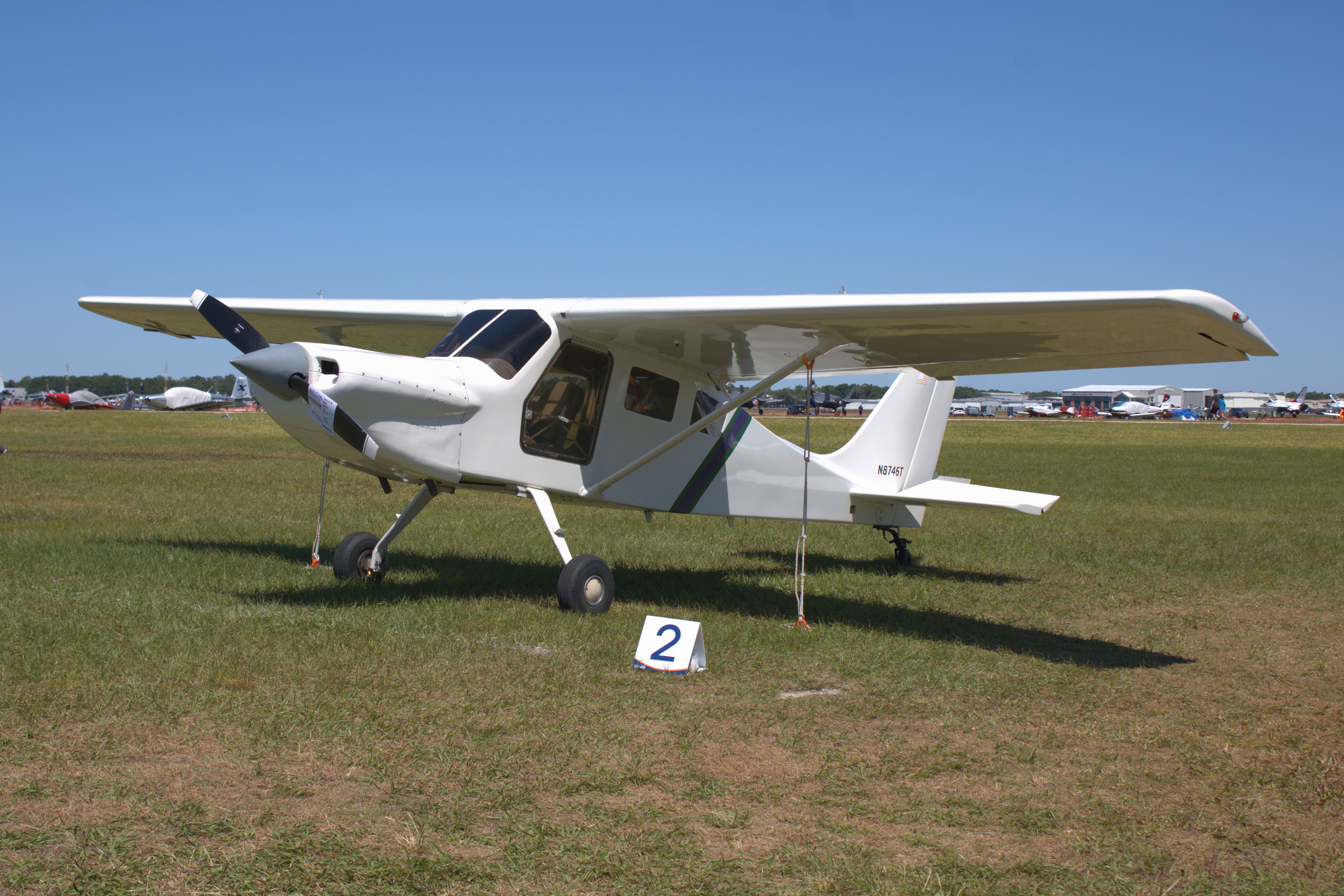
Comp Air 3 at 2024 Sun 'n Fun

The Comp Air 3 is a small civil utility aircraft marketed in kit form by Comp Air. It is a conventional, high-wing monoplane built largely of composite materials and which can be configured with either tailwheel or tricycle undercarriage. The design is based on the Comp Air 4, but the fuselage has been reduced in width, sacrificing seating for improved aerodynamics. The prototype first flew on February 25, 2002.

The company website does not list it as being in production in 2022.

== See also ==
Related development

- Comp Air 4

Aircraft of comparable role, configuration, and era

- Cessna Bird Dog
