= Jacarepaguá Airport =

Airport in Rio de Janeiro, Brazil

Jacarepaguá–Roberto Marinho Airport Aeroporto de Jacarepaguá–Roberto Marinho
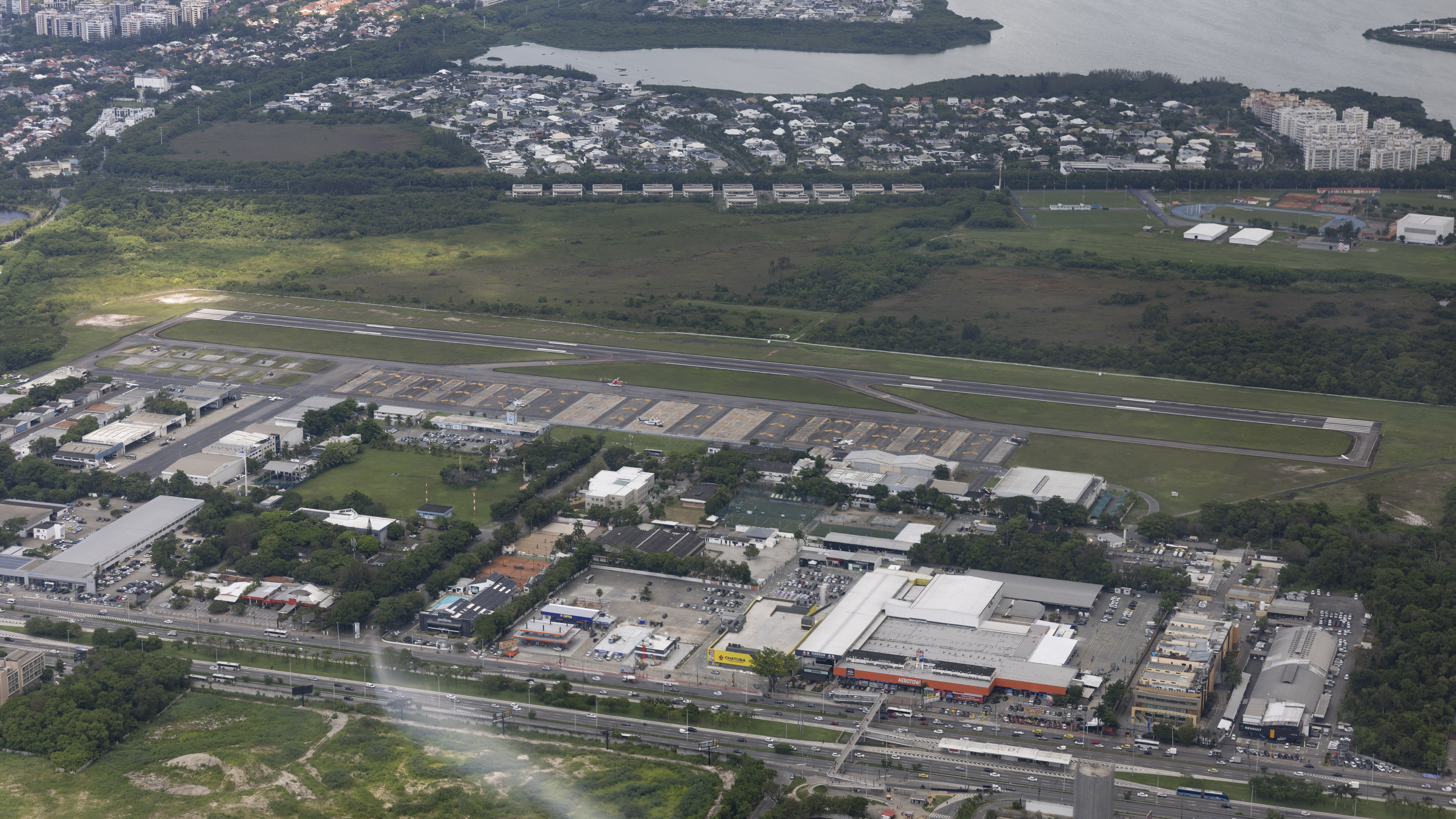
- IATA: RRJ; ICAO: SBJR; LID: RJ0005

Summary
- Airport type: Public
- Operator: ARSA (1973–1987); Infraero (1987–2022); Pax Aeroportos (2022–present)
- Serves: Rio de Janeiro
- Opened: November 14, 1927; 98 years ago
- Time zone: BRT (UTC−03:00)
- Elevation AMSL: 3 m (9.8 ft)
- Coordinates: 22°59′15″S 043°22′12″W
- Website: www.paxaeroportos.com.br

Map
- Location within greater Rio de Janeiro RRJ (Rio de Janeiro (state)) RRJ (Brazil)

Runways
Direction	Length		Surface
Direction	m	ft	Surface
03/21	900	2,952	Asphalt

Statistics (2024)
- Aircraft Operations: 82,779
- Statistics: Pax; Sources: Airport Website, ANAC, DECEA

Jacarepaguá–Roberto Marinho Airport (IATA: RRJ, ICAO: SBJR) is an airport in the neighborhood of Barra da Tijuca, Rio de Janeiro, Brazil. Following extensive renovation in 2008 the airport was renamed after Roberto Pisani Marinho (1904–2003), a journalist and former president of Globo Network. It is a major helibase for offshore support.

The airport is operated by Pax Aeroportos.

== History ==
On November 14, 1927 the Compagnie Générale Aéropostale started its operations in Brazil flying between Natal and Buenos Aires, with multiple stops on the Brazilian coast, using aircraft with landing gear having as pilots Jean Mermoz, Antoine de Saint-Exupéry, and Henri Guillaumet among others. It was part of a larger project linking France and South America. The airline was based in Rio de Janeiro, from where flights departed north and southbound. In Rio de Janeiro it used not only the military airport Campo dos Afonsos but it also had its own alternative airport, called Latecoère Field. This private facility became later known as Jacarepaguá Airport. Even though Campo dos Afonsos had a better structure and easier access, the air approach was difficult and the weather was not always good. With the dissolution of Aéropostale in 1932 the airport was forgotten.

In 1944, the airport became a base of the Brazilian Air Force and it was used for flight training. On September 19, 1966 it was decommissioned and it became an airfield for general aviation.

It was only in 1969 that the construction of a terminal, an apron and hangars began. On January 19, 1971 the new airport was officially opened.

The main user was Aeroclube do Brasil (Portuguese: Brazil Flying club). It operated previously at Manguinhos Airport but with the closure of that facility in 1961 it spent years without being able to operate. In 1971 it moved its headquarters to Jacarepaguá Airport where hangars and administrative and social center were built and it was able to operate once again.

During the year 2007 Jacarepaguá Airport underwent major renovations as preparations for the 2007 Pan American Games. The runway was extended, the terminal was renovated, the control-tower got new equipment and the apron and runway got new lightning systems. Later, Infraero considered the airport in condition to handle the increase of traffic during the 2014 FIFA World Cup and the 2016 Summer Olympics.

Currently, most of the operations at the airport are by helicopter and aircraft operators offshore oilfields. Additionally, between October 28, 2019 and March 13, 2020 TwoFlex operated regular passenger flights to São Paulo–Congonhas Airport. Later, on October 31, 2022, those flights resumed by the same airline under a new name: Azul Conecta.

Previously operated by Infraero, on August 18, 2022 Pax Aeroportos controlled by XP Inc. won a 30-year concession to operate the airport.

== Airlines and destinations ==
Airlines	Destinations
Azul Conecta	Belo Horizonte–Confins, Campinas; Seasonal: Angra dos Reis (begins 27 December 2026)

== Statistics ==
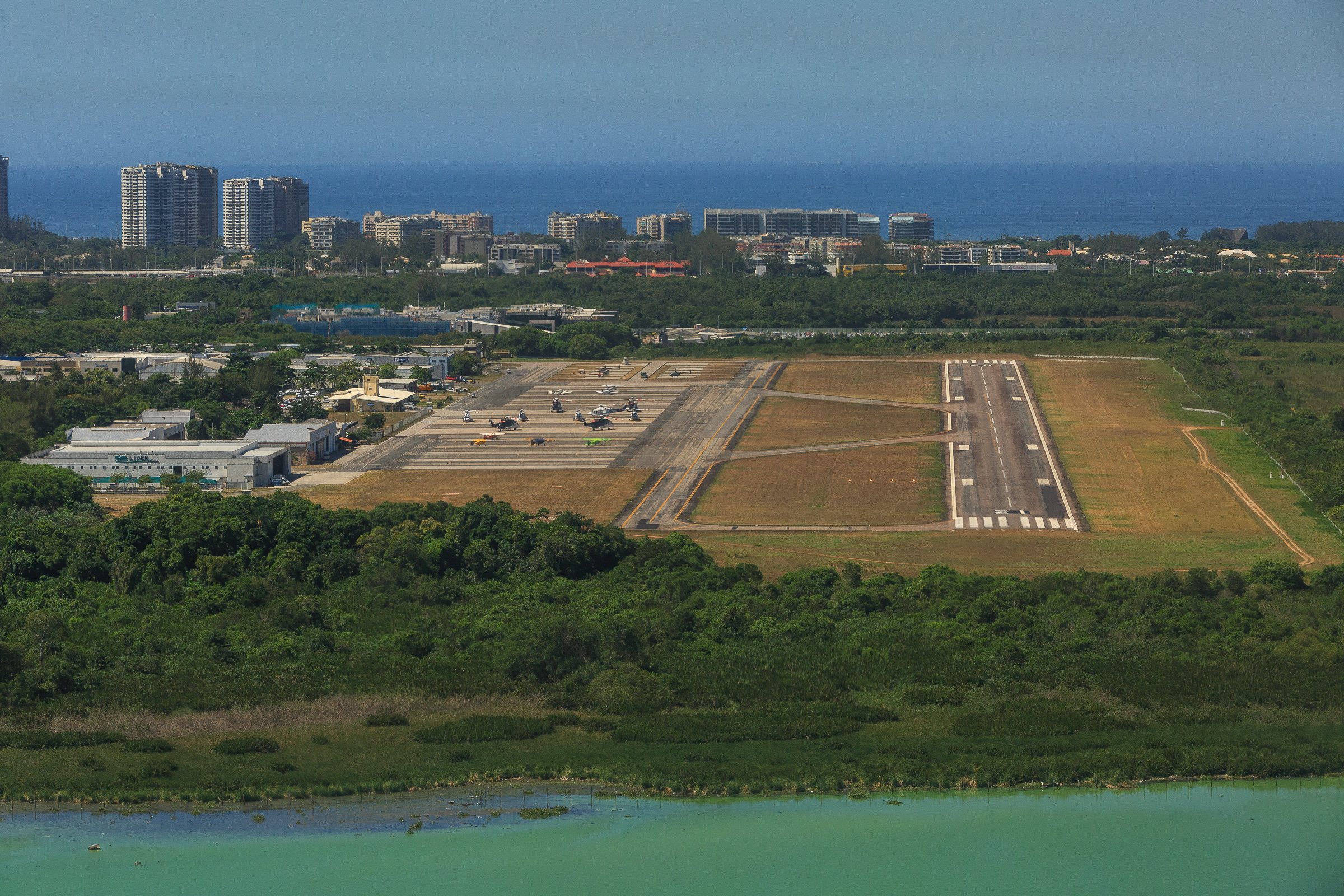
Approach to runway 21

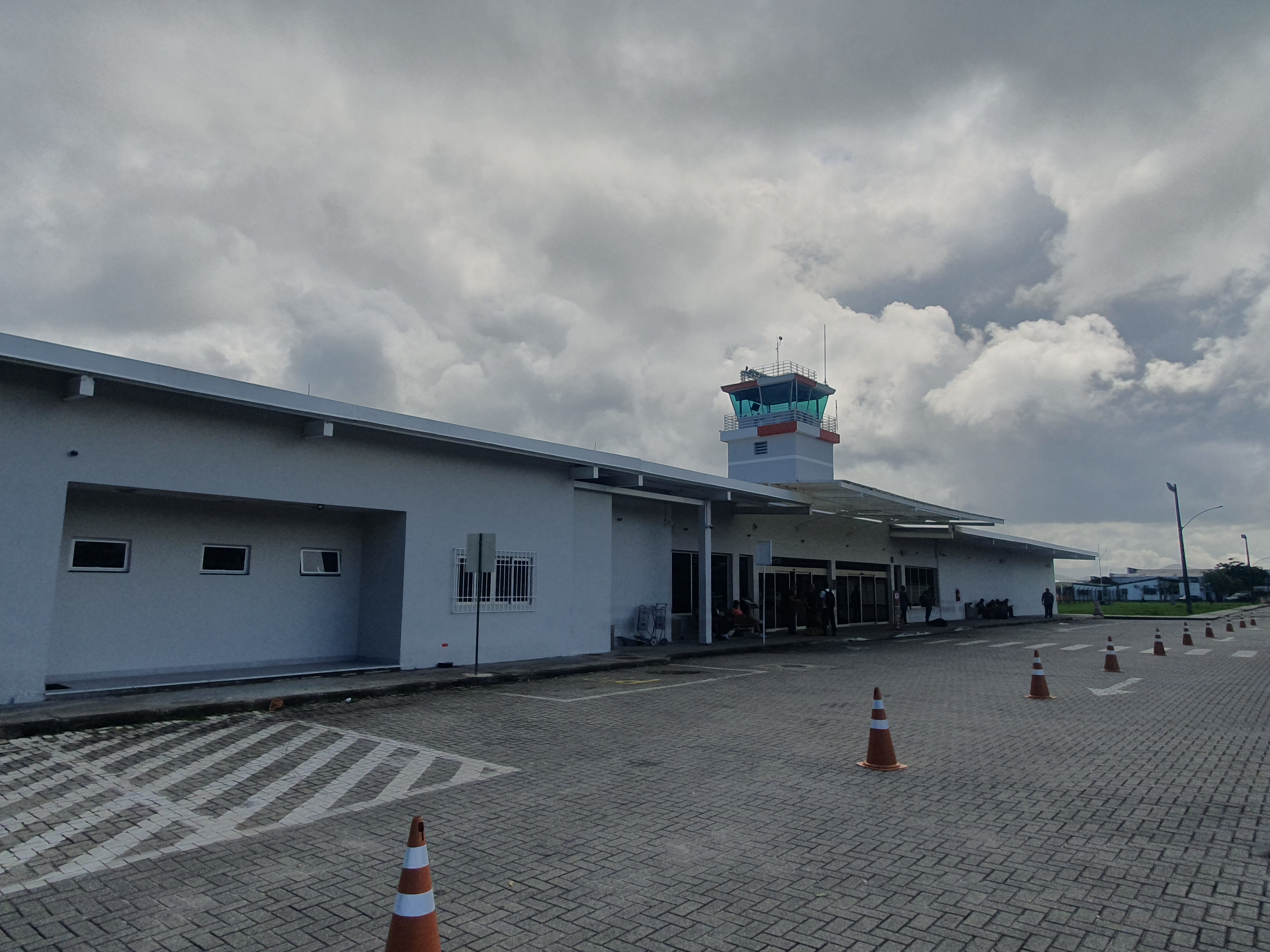
Terminal building

Following is the number of passenger, aircraft and cargo movements at the airport, according to Infraero (2007-August 31, 2023) and Pax (2024) reports:

Year	Passenger	Aircraft	Cargo (t)
2024		82,779	
2023^{a}	147,561	54,762	99
2022	191,388 ▲15%	74,197 ▲8%	18 ▲1,800%
2021	167,028 ▲10%	68,687 ▲30%	0 ▼100%
2020	151,419 ▼12%	52,646 ▼21%	5 ▼29%
2019	171,286 ▼13%	66,365 ▲4%	7 ▲700%
2018	197,345 ▼8%	63,750 ▲8%	0
2017	214,322 ▲13%	59,192 ▲6%	0
2016	189,303 ▼6%	55,784 ▼11%	0
2015	200,570 ▲17%	62,679 ▼18%	0
2014	171,581 ▲18%	76,233	0
2013	145,062 ▼4%	76,083	0
2012	151,313 ▼6%	75,829 ▲5%	0
2011	160,365 ▲19%	72,242 ▲2%	0
2010	135,277 ▲19%	70,983 ▲12%	0
2009	114,093 ▲42%	63,588 ▲30%	0
2008	80,603 ▼1%	49,034 ▼6%	0
2007	81,033	51,949	0

Note:
^{a}: Neither Infraero or Pax Airports have informed statistics for September 1 to December 31, 2023.

== Accidents and incidents ==
- 17 May 1975: a Douglas C-47B PP-CDD of Motortec Indústria Aeronáutica was reported to have been damaged beyond economic repair at Jacarepaguá Airport.

== Access ==
The airport is located on Avenida Ayrton Senna in the neighborhood of Barra da Tijuca, 34 km (21 mi) from downtown Rio de Janeiro. It is next to a station on the TransCarioca and TransOlímpica BRTs with services running to Terminal Alvorada, Madureira station, Jardim Oceânico / Barra da Tijuca station, Terminal Centro Olímpico and Deodoro station.

== See also ==
- List of airports in Brazil
