= Comp Air 12 =

Comp Air CA12
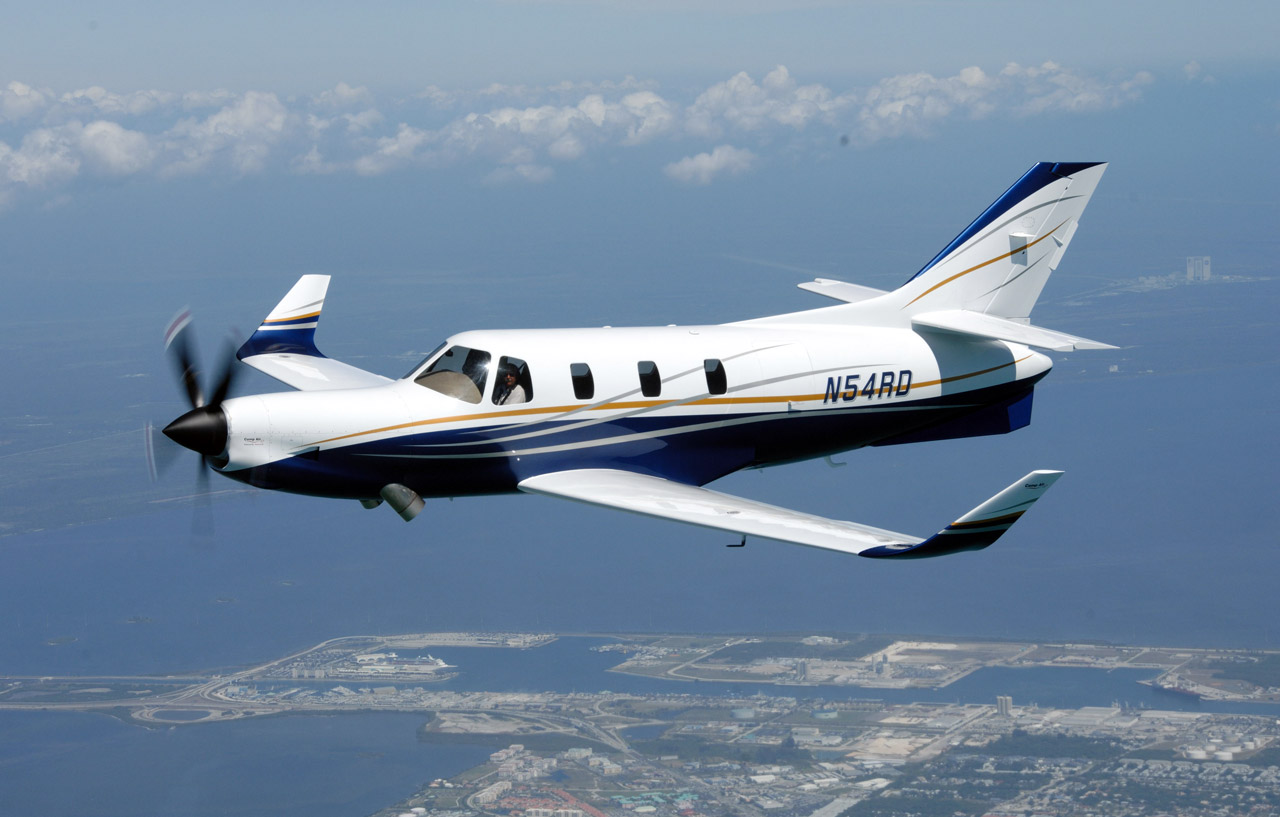

General information
- Type: Civil utility aircraft
- National origin: United States
- Manufacturer: Comp Air

The Comp Air CA12 is a turboprop-powered civil utility aircraft, currently under development. Comp Air is seeking certification. It is configured as a conventional, low-wing monoplane with tricycle undercarriage. The first flight was on April 14, 2007.

== Specifications (as designed) ==
General characteristics

- Crew: 1
- Capacity: 8 to 10
- Length: 41 ft 5 in (12.62 m)
- Wingspan: 48 ft (15 m)
- Wing area: 300 sq ft (28 m^{2})
- Empty weight: 5,880 lb (2,667 kg)
- Max takeoff weight: 10,800 lb (4,899 kg)
- Powerplant: 1 × Honeywell TPE331-14GR turboprop, 1,650 hp (1,230 kW)

Performance

- Cruise speed: 300 kn (350 mph, 560 km/h)
- Stall speed: 73 kn (84 mph, 135 km/h)
- Range: 2,535 nmi (2,917 mi, 4,695 km)
- Rate of climb: 2,800 ft/min (14 m/s) at gross weight
- Wing loading: 35 lb/sq ft (170 kg/m^{2})

Avionics
Sebastian Communication / OP Technologies

== See also ==
Related development

- Aerocomp Comp Air Jet
