= Angra dos Reis Airport =

Angra dos Reis–Carmelo Jordão Airport Aeroporto de Angra dos Reis–Carmelo Jordão
- IATA: GDR; ICAO: SDAG; LID: RJ0010

Summary
- Airport type: Public
- Operator: Angra Aeroportos
- Serves: Angra dos Reis
- Opened: 1979
- Time zone: BRT (UTC−03:00)
- Elevation AMSL: 3 m (9.8 ft)
- Coordinates: 22°58′31″S 044°18′26″W
- Website: angraeroportos.com.br

Map
- Location in Brazil GDR (Brazil)

Runways
Direction	Length		Surface
Direction	m	ft	Surface
10/28	913	2,995	Asphalt
- Sources: Airport Website, ANAC, DECEA

Carmelo Jordão Airport (IATA: GDR, ICAO: SDAG), is the airport serving Angra dos Reis, Brazil. It is named after a local entrepreneur.

It is operated by Angra Aero-Portos.

== History ==
The airport was commissioned in 1979.

== Airlines and destinations ==
Airlines	Destinations
Azul Conecta	Seasonal: Belo Horizonte–Confins (begins 6 February 2027), Rio de Janeiro–Jacarepaguá (begins 27 December 2026), São Paulo–Campo de Marte (begins 27 December 2026)

== Access ==
The airport is located 5 km (3 mi) from downtown Angra dos Reis.

== See also ==
- List of airports in Brazil
