= Comp Air =

American aircraft manufacturer

- Company type: Kit plane manufacturing
- Founder: Ron Lueck
- Headquarters: Titusville, Florida, United States
- Key people: President: Ron Lueck
- Website: www.compairaviation.com

Comp Air Inc, formerly known as Aerocomp Inc, is an aircraft manufacturer based in Merritt Island, Florida, owned by Ron Lueck.

The firm originally manufactured floats for seaplanes, using composite materials. It later branched out into aircraft, marketing them in kit form for homebuilding. It now offers 3-10 place kit aircraft, with the latest developments being in the experimental Jet market. In 2004, the company test-flew its most ambitious project, a homebuilt jet aircraft, the Aerocomp Comp Air Jet.

A wholly owned subsidiary, with partner Patrick Farrell, Forward.Vision, manufactures Infra-red viewing systems for aviation use.

== List of Aircraft ==
- Aerocomp Merlin (1987) Single-engine two-seat high-wing ultralight aircraft. Built by Blue Yonder Aviation of Indus, Alberta and marketed by Comp Air as kit homebuilt (discontinued)
- Aerocomp EZ Flyer (1997) Single-engine two-seat high-wing ultralight aircraft. Built by Blue Yonder Aviation of Indus, Alberta and marketed by Comp Air as kit homebuilt (discontinued)
- Comp Air 3 (2002) Single-engine high-wing aircraft. Development of Comp Air 4. Marketed as kit homebuilt (discontinued)
- Comp Air 4 Single-engine four-seat civil utility aircraft. Marketed as kit homebuilt.
- Comp Air 6 Single-engine six-seat high-wing civil utility aircraft. Marketed as kit homebuilt.
- Comp Air 7 Single-engine seven-seat high-wing turboprop engine aircraft. Marketed as kit homebuilt.
- Comp Air 8 Single-engine eight-seat high-wing turboprop engine aircraft (stretch version of Comp Air 7). Marketed as kit homebuilt.
- Comp Air 9 (2008) Single-engine six-seat high-wing turboprop engine aircraft. Marketed as kit homebuilt, but the company intends to produce a certificated version.
- Comp Air 10 Single-engine ten-seat high-wing turboprop engine aircraft (larger version of Comp Air 8). Marketed as kit homebuilt.
- Comp Air 11 (2009) Single-engine six-seat low-wing turboprop engine aircraft. Marketed as kit homebuilt, but the company intends to produce a certificated version.
- Comp Air 12 (2007) Single-engine low-wing turboprop engine, tricycle undercarriage. Type certification being pursued; factory-built
- Comp Air Jet (2004) Single turbofan jet engine, eight-seat low-wing aircraft with tricycle undercarriage. Marketed as kit homebuilt.
