= Campo de Marte Airport =

Airport in São Paulo, Brazil

Campo de Marte Airport Aeroporto Campo de Marte
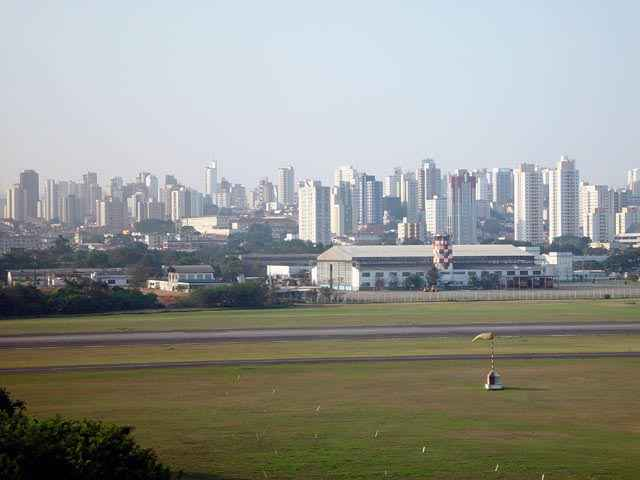
- IATA: RTE; ICAO: SBMT; LID: SP0007

Summary
- Airport type: Public/Military
- Operator: Infraero (1979–2022); Pax Aeroportos (2022–present)
- Serves: São Paulo
- Opened: 26 July 1929; 97 years ago
- Time zone: BRT (UTC−03:00)
- Elevation AMSL: 723 m (2,372 ft)
- Coordinates: 23°30′33″S 046°38′15″W
- Website: paxaeroportos.com.br

Map
- Location in Brazil RTE (São Paulo State) RTE (Brazil)

Runways
Direction	Length		Surface
Direction	m	ft	Surface
12/30	1,600	5,250	Asphalt

Helipads
Number	Length		Surface
Number	m	ft	Surface
11/28	25	82	Cobblestone

Statistics (2024)
- Aircraft Operations: 58,304
- Statistics: Pax; Sources: Airport Website, ANAC, DECEA

Campo de Marte Airport (IATA: RTE, ICAO: SBMT) is the first airport built in São Paulo, Brazil, opened in 1929. It is named after Champ de Mars, in Paris, which in turn took its name from Campus Martius, in Rome.

The airport is operated by Pax Aeroportos.

== History ==
Campo de Marte was the first airport built in São Paulo, officially opened on 26 July 1929.

The airport was bombarded during the 1932 Constitutionalist Revolution.

On 12 November 1933 a ceremony marking the start-up of scheduled flights of VASP took place at the airport. The first two routes linked Campo de Marte to São Carlos and São José do Rio Preto, and to Ribeirão Preto and Uberaba.

It handled all air operations in São Paulo until VASP opened Congonhas Airport in 1936. VASP considered it a necessary move because of unexpected growing demands, and to avoid a problem of constant flooding by the adjoining Tietê River, particularly the one that happened in 1929.

São Paulo Air Force Base was created on 22 May 1941 by Decree 3,302 at Campo de Marte Airport. On 26 January 1945 the base at Campo de Marte was decommissioned and transferred to its present location, then called Cumbica Farm at Guarulhos.

Presently it houses the São Paulo Flying club, founded in 1931, helicopters and general aviation services. It has limited night operations capability, usually reserved to helicopters.

The 4th command of the Brazilian Air Force is also located on the premises.

On 11 May 2007, Pope Benedict XVI canonized the first Brazilian-born saint, Frei Galvão, during a mass on the site.

An agreement to establish an aerospace museum at the airport was signed in 2017.

Previously operated by Infraero, on 18 August 2022 Pax Aeroportos controlled by XP Inc. won a 30-year concession to operate the airport.

An agreement between the federal and municipal governments over the use of the land was finally reached by February 2025, allowing work to progress on the aviation museum.

== Airlines and destinations ==
Airlines	Destinations
Azul Conecta	Seasonal: Angra dos Reis (begins 27 December 2026)

== Statistics ==
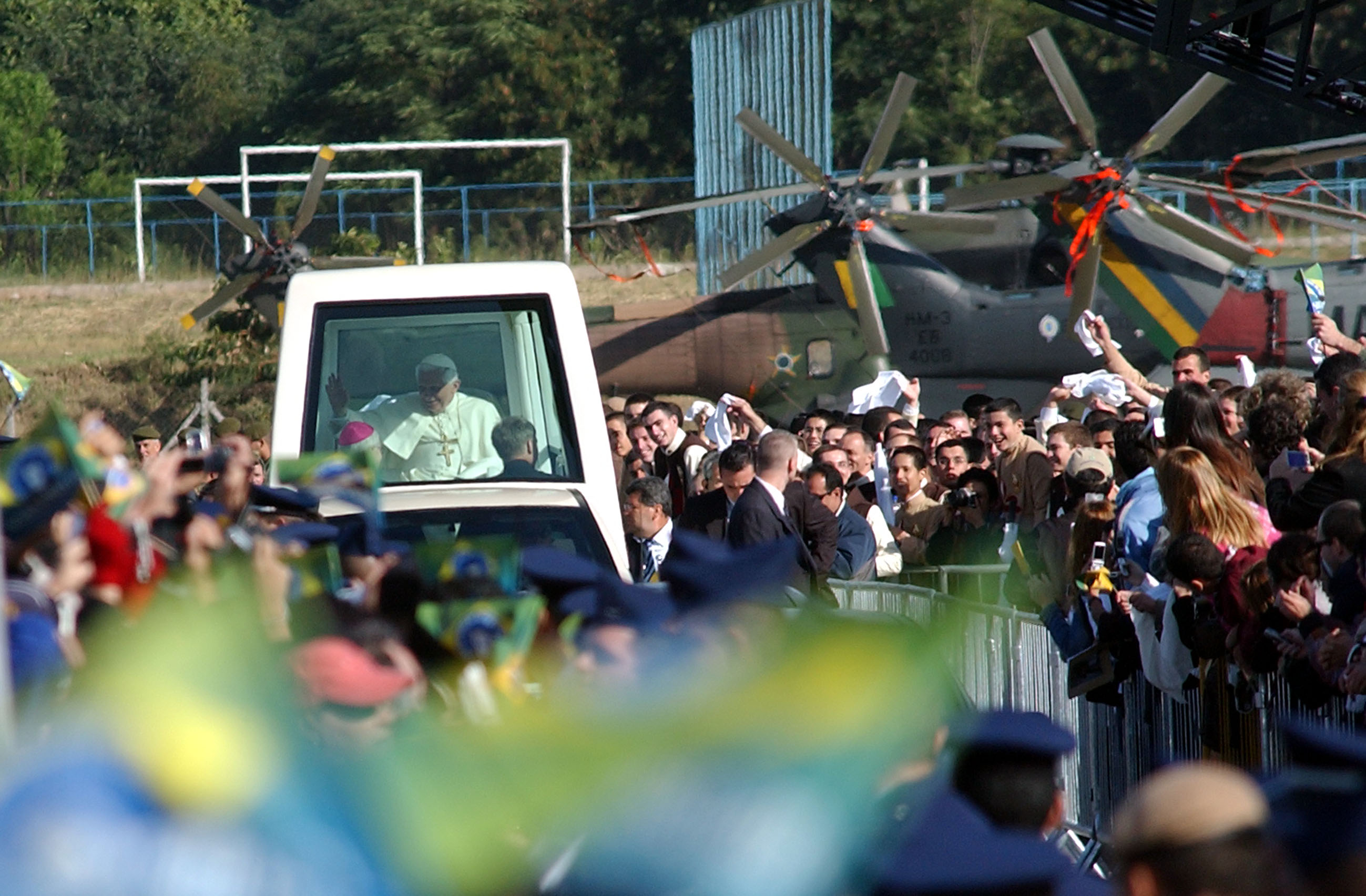
Pope Benedict XVI during a mass celebrated on May 11, 2007 at the airport

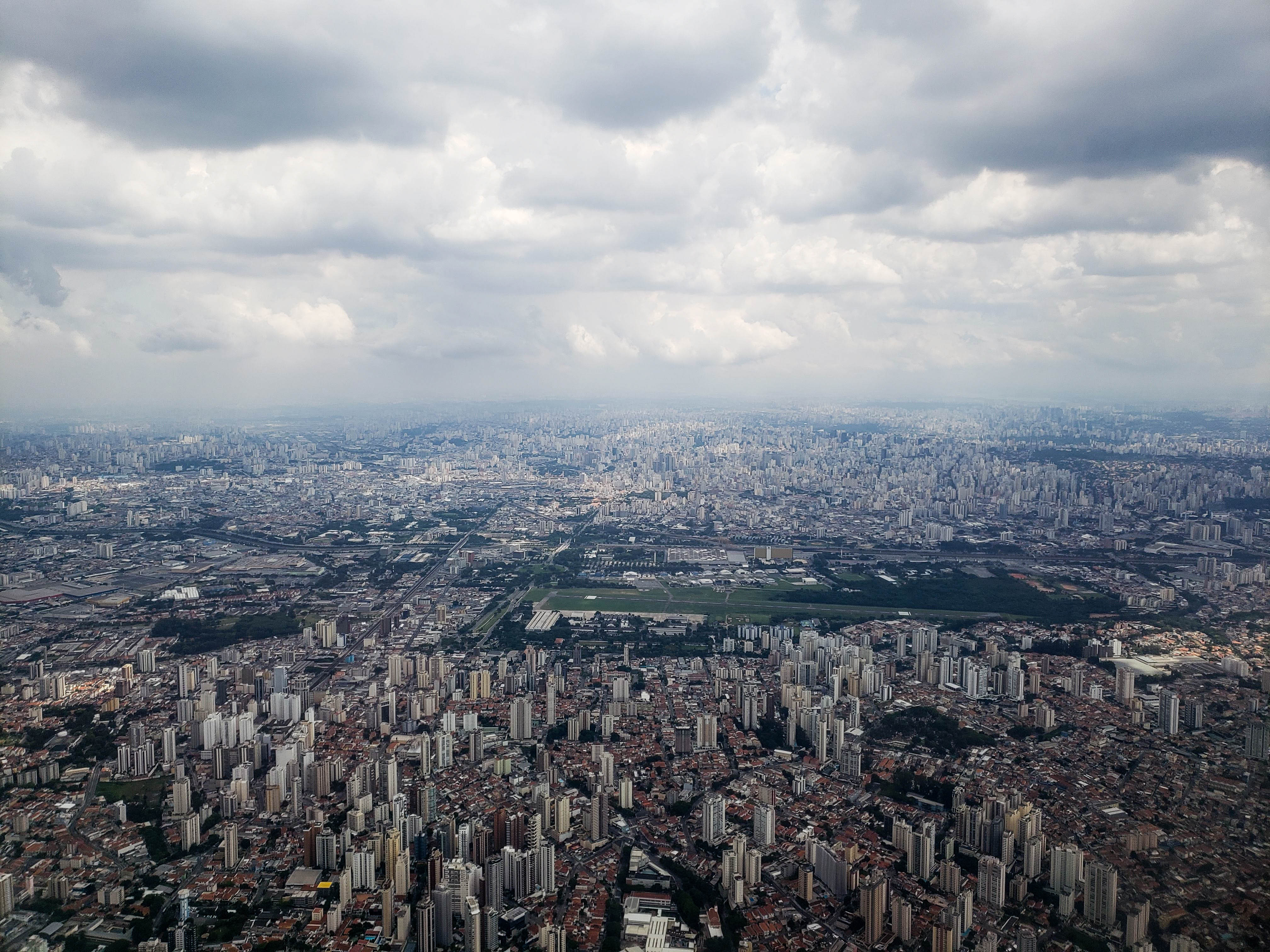
Aerial view of the airport

Following is the number of passenger, aircraft and cargo movements at the airport, according to Infraero (2007-31 August 2023) and Pax (2024) reports:

Year	Passenger	Aircraft	Cargo (t)
2024		58,304	
2023^{a}	66,445	35,796	0
2022	103,361 ▲7%	57,194 ▲3%	0
2021	96,897 ▲29%	55,671 ▲21%	0
2020	75,171 ▼22%	45,988 ▼27%	0
2019	96,735 ▼19%	63,281 ▼13%	0
2018	118,872	72,376 ▲5%	0
2017	118,984 ▼5%	69,137 ▼3%	0
2016	125,324 ▼17%	71,044 ▼24%	0
2015	151,275 ▼18%	93,354 ▼20%	0
2014	185,494 ▼25%	116,924 ▼13%	0
2013	246,087 ▼42%	135,155 ▼6%	0
2012	427,160 ▲10%	143,799 ▲8%	0
2011	388,100 ▲7%	133,509 ▲9%	0
2010	361,984 ▲16%	123,009 ▲18%	0
2009	312,460 ▲16%	104,502 ▲2%	0 ▼100%
2008	269,498 ▲17%	102,088 ▲9%	252 ▲22%
2007	230,276	93,452	206

Note:
^{a}: Neither Infraero or Pax Airports have informed statistics for 1 September – 31 December 2023.

== Accidents and incidents ==
- 4 November 2007: an Air Taxi Learjet 35A registration PT-OVC crashed over a house in a residential area nearby after a failed takeoff attempt from Campo de Marte, killing the pilot, co-pilot, and 6 people on the ground.
- 19 March 2016: a private kit aircraft, model Comp Air 9 registration PR-ZRA crashed into one house in the neighborhood of Casa Verde, about one mile after takeoff, killing 7 people on board and injuring one resident. Among the victims were entrepreneur Roger Agnelli and his family.
- 7 February 2025: a private Beechcraft F90 King Air registration PS-FEM crashed shortly after takeoff.The aircraft came down on Avenida Marquês de São Vicente, Barra Funda, São Paulo, and burst into flames as it skidded down the road after hitting a bus. Both occupants perished and the aircraft was destroyed. Also six people on the ground were injured.

== Access ==
The airport is located 6 km (4 mi) from downtown São Paulo in the district of Santana.

== See also ==
- List of airports in Brazil
