= Comp Air 4 =

American homebuilt airplane

General information
- Type: Light utility aircraft
- National origin: United States of America
- Manufacturer: Comp Air
- Status: production completed
- Number built: 31 (2011)

History
- First flight: April 3, 1995

The Comp Air 4 (also known as the Comp Monster) is an American light civil utility aircraft manufactured in kit form by Comp Air. Builders are able to choose between an airframe designed for engines in the 140-180 hp (104-134 kW) range, and a heavier one for 250 hp (187 kW) units. The latter airframe can be fitted with up to six seats, while the standard airframe seats four. The Comp Air 4 may be built with tailwheel, tricycle, float, or amphibious float undercarriage.

The company website does not list it as being in production in 2022.

== Specifications (typical Comp Air 4 on wheels) ==
Data from Jane's All The World's Aircraft 2003–2004

General characteristics

- Crew: one pilot
- Capacity: three passengers
- Length: 26 ft 0 in (7.92 m)
- Wingspan: 37 ft 7 in (11.46 m)
- Height: 8 ft 0 in (2.44 m)
- Wing area: 212 sq ft (19.7 m^{2})
- Empty weight: 1,390 lb (632 kg)
- Max takeoff weight: 2,850 lb (1,292 kg)
- Powerplant: 1 × Lycoming O-360-A1A air-cooled flat-four piston engine, 180 hp (134 kW)

Performance

- Maximum speed: 149 mph (239 km/h, 129 kn)
- Cruise speed: 130 mph (212 km/h, 115 kn) (75% power)
- Stall speed: 39 mph (63 km/h, 34 kn)
- Range: 759 mi (1,222 km, 660 nmi)
- Service ceiling: 16,000 ft (4,880 m)
- Rate of climb: 1,450 ft/min (7.4 m/s)

== See also ==
Related development

- Comp Air 3
