= Comp Air 6 =

Light civil utility aircraft

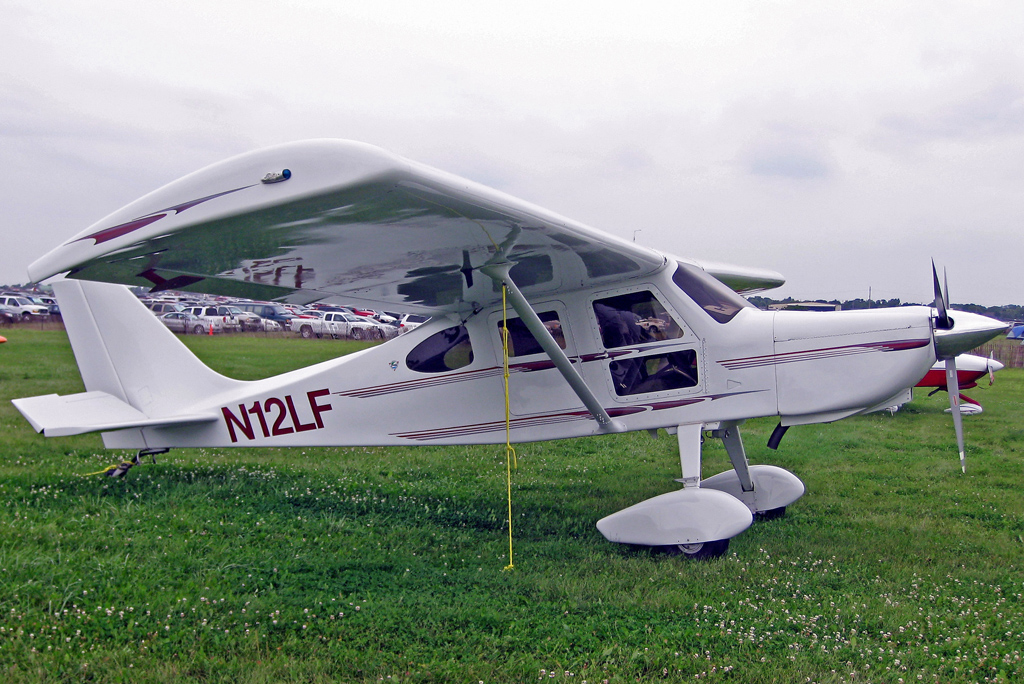
- 1998-built Comp Air 6 at AirVenture in 2010

General information
- Type: Kit aircraft
- National origin: United States
- Manufacturer: Comp Air
- Number built: 66 (2011)

History
- First flight: January 1996

The Comp Air 6 is a light civil utility aircraft manufactured in the United States by Comp Air.

== Design and development ==
The Comp Air 6 is a stretched and widened development of the four-seat Aerocomp CompMonster which had first flown on 3 April 1995.

The Comp Air 6 has a fore-and-aft fuselage splice to widen and lengthen the cabin from the original design. It is usually supplied in kit form. The design is configured as a conventional high-wing monoplane and may be built with either tricycle or tailwheel undercarriage and may alternately be equipped with floats as the CA6SF, amphibious as the CA6AF, or with skis.

== Specifications (Comp Air 6, 220 hp Franklin engine) ==
Data from Jane's All The World's Aircraft 2003–2004.

General characteristics

- Crew: one pilot
- Capacity: 3 adults and two children
- Length: 24 ft 6 in (7.47 m)
- Wingspan: 34 ft 6 in (10.52 m)
- Height: 8 ft 0 in (2.44 m)
- Wing area: 212.0 sq ft (19.70 m^{2})
- Airfoil: modified Clark Y
- Empty weight: 1,490 lb (676 kg)
- Max takeoff weight: 2,580 lb (1,293 kg)
- Powerplant: 1 × Franklin piston engine, 220 hp (164 kW)

Performance

- Maximum speed: 167 mph (268 km/h, 145 kn)
- Cruise speed: 153 mph (246 km/h, 133 kn)
- Stall speed: 40 mph (65 km/h, 35 kn)
- Range: 800 mi (1,287 km, 695 nmi)
- Service ceiling: 18,000 ft (5,480 m)
- Rate of climb: 1,200 ft/min (6.1 m/s)
