= Comp Air 7 =

American light aircraft

Comp Air 7 Series
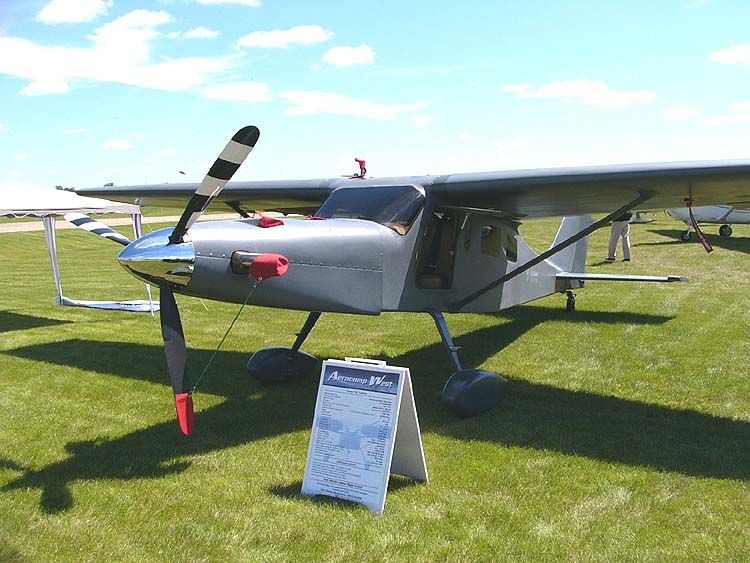
- Aero Comp 7SL

General information
- Type: Comp Air 7
- Manufacturer: Comp Air
- Status: Production completed
- Number built: 115 (2011)

The Comp Air 7 is an American piston or turboprop-powered light civil utility aircraft manufactured in kit form by Comp Air. It is configured as a conventional high-wing monoplane with tailwheel undercarriage.

The company website does not list it as being in production in 2022.

== Operational history ==
By the fall of 2007 70 Comp Air 7s and 25 Comp Air 7SLs had been completed and were flying.

== Variants ==
Comp Air 7
Piston-powered aircraft typically equipped with a Lycoming IO-540 piston engine of 290 hp
Comp Air 7SLX
Turbine powered aircraft equipped typically with a Walter M601 turboprop of 660 shp

== Specifications (typical Comp Air 7SLX) ==
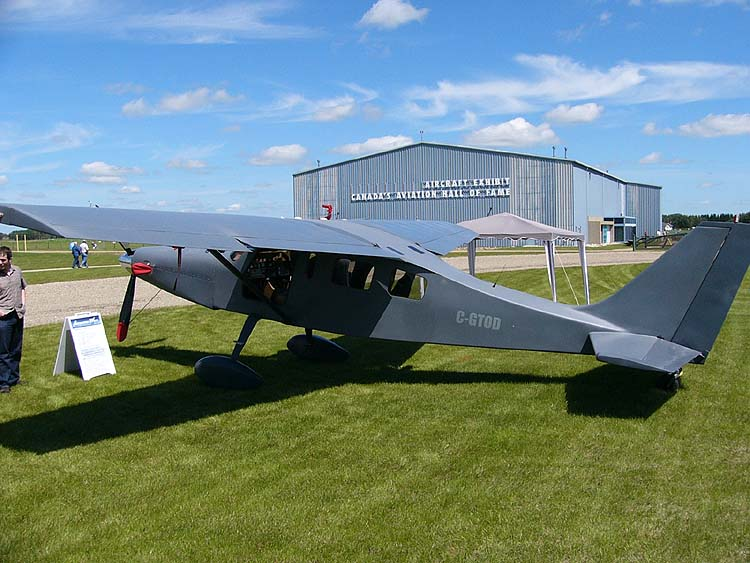
Comp Air 7SL

Data from Kitplanes Magazine

General characteristics

- Crew: one pilot
- Capacity: 6 passengers
- Length: 29 ft 6 in (8.99 m)
- Wingspan: 33 ft 0 in (10.15 m)
- Height: 8 ft 0 in (2.44 m)
- Wing area: 178 sq ft (16.5 m^{2})
- Empty weight: 2,400 lb (1,088 kg)
- Max takeoff weight: 4,200 lb (1,905 kg)
- Powerplant: 1 × Walter M601 turboprop, 660 shp (550 kW)

Performance

- Maximum speed: 275 mph (443 km/h, 239 kn)
- Cruise speed: 230 mph (372 km/h, 200 kn)
- Stall speed: 54 mph (87 km/h, 47 kn)
- Range: 1,047 mi (1,685 km, 1,040 nmi)
- Rate of climb: 3,000 ft/min (15 m/s)
- Power/mass: 6.36 lb/hp (0.26 kW/kg)
