= Comp Air Jet =

American homebuilt jet

General information
- Type: homebuilt private jet
- National origin: United States
- Manufacturer: Comp Air
- Status: Production completed

History
- First flight: 10 July 2004

The Comp Air Jet is an American eight-seat, low-wing, pressurized, tricycle undercarriage, turbofan-powered civil utility aircraft marketed by Comp Air for amateur construction.

The company website does not list it as being in production in 2022.

== Design and development ==
In 2002 the co-owners of Aerocomp, which is now known as Comp Air, Steve Young and Ron Lueck announced the Comp Air Jet project. The jet is constructed from a "proprietary carbon-fiber hybrid sandwich" and powered by a Ukrainian Ivchenko AI-25 engine. Alternative engines planned for included the Pratt & Whitney JT12-8 or CJ610 or projected future Williams International or Agilis engines.

On July 10, 2004 the Comp Air Jet flew for the first time from Merritt Island Airport. Though the gear was not retracted during the flight, the aircraft still reached speeds of 157 kn (291 km/h). The jet landed after 37 minutes with the landing taking about 2000 feet.

On January 11, 2005 Aerocomp flew the prototype back to the Merritt Island Airport for further development work after more than 30 hours of flight testing at Space Coast Regional Airport, Titusville, Florida.

== Operational history ==
As of April 2011 the prototype remained the sole example registered with the Federal Aviation Administration.

== Specifications (Comp Air Jet) ==
Data from Kitplanes and Comp Air

General characteristics

- Crew: one
- Capacity: seven passengers
- Length: 35 ft 0 in (10.67 m)
- Wingspan: 44 ft 0 in (13.41 m)
- Wing area: 297 sq ft (27.6 m^{2})
- Powerplant: 1 × Ivchenko AI-25 , 3,500 hp (2,600 kW) for take-off

Performance

- Cruise speed: 350 kn (400 mph, 650 km/h)
- Stall speed: 62 kn (71 mph, 114 km/h)
- Range: 1,430 nmi (1,650 mi, 2,660 km)
- Rate of climb: 2,000 ft/min (10 m/s)

== See also ==
Aircraft of comparable role, configuration, and era

- Epic Victory
