= Martin Marietta Model 845 =

US remotely piloted aircraft, 1972

Model 845

General information
- Type: Communications relay drone
- National origin: United States
- Manufacturer: Martin Marietta
- Primary user: United States Air Force
- Number built: 3

History
- First flight: April 1972

The Martin Marietta Model 845 was a remotely piloted aircraft developed in the United States in the late 1960s and early 1970s for use as a communications relay in the Vietnam War.

== Design and development ==
Two prototypes were built as part of the United States Air Force's Compass Dwell program, these machines also being based on a Schweizer SGS 1-34 sailplane and similar in configuration to the competing XQM-93 design by Ling-Temco-Vought. Test flights began in April 1972; during testing, one of the prototypes stayed aloft for almost 28 hours, however it failed to meet the Air Force's requirement of a 40,000 feet (12,000 m) service ceiling. In 1973 The Model 845A was cancelled (along with the XQM-93), the program being replaced by Compass Cope.

== Surviving airframes ==
After the cancellation of the program, two 845 airframes were transferred by the Office of Naval Research to New Mexico Tech for use by the Langmuir Laboratory for Atmospheric Research, where they currently remain. Airframe 845A, which was converted into a piloted aircraft, was later used as a platform for atmospheric research. It continued flying as SPTVAR (Special Purpose Test Vehicle for Atmospheric Research) until the late 1990s. Its missions included flights over the Langmuir Laboratory facility in south-central New Mexico, flying through thunderstorms and making measurements of the electric field inside clouds. The other airframe, still configured as the original drone design, is in storage at the same facility.

== Specifications (variant) ==
Data from

General characteristics

- Crew: None
- Length: 25 ft 4.75 in (7.7407 m)
- Wingspan: 59 ft 1.25 in (18.0150 m)
- Height: 9 ft 6 in (2.90 m)
- Gross weight: 2,320 lb (1,052 kg)
- Powerplant: 1 × Lycoming TIO-360-A3B6 horizontally opposed piston engine, 200 hp (150 kW)

Performance

- Maximum speed: 150 mph (240 km/h, 130 kn)
- Endurance: 28 hours

== See also ==
Related development

- Schweizer SGS 1-34

Aircraft of comparable role, configuration, and era

- Beechcraft QU-22 Pave Eagle
- Lockheed YO-3
- LTV L450F
- LTV XQM-93

Related lists

- List of military aircraft of the United States
