= LTV XQM-93 =

Type of aircraft

XQM-93
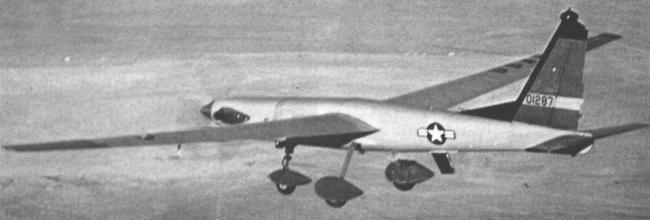

General information
- Type: Communications relay drone
- National origin: United States
- Manufacturer: Ling-Temco-Vought

History
- First flight: February 1970
- Developed from: LTV L450F

The Ling-Temco-Vought XQM-93 is a remotely piloted aircraft developed in the United States in the late 1960s and early 1970s for use as a communications relay in the Vietnam War. A prototype flew in 1970, but the program was abandoned without producing a service-ready aircraft.

== Design and development ==
In the late 1960s, following the early microwave HALE (High Altitude Long Endurance) vehicle studies, the US Air Force worked with LTV Electrosystems (later E-Systems) under the Compass Dwell program to build an unmanned aerial vehicle (UAV) using much more conventional turboprop propulsion. At least part of the motivation or inspiration for this effort was derived from the Igloo White program, which was a multiservice attempt to cut the flow of supplies from North Vietnam to South Vietnam through the network of paths and roads running through Cambodia and Laos known as the "Ho Chi Minh Trail".

Igloo White involved seeding the region with thousands of seismic and acoustic sensors, most of them air-dropped, which would pick up indications of traffic along the trail and report them back to a central command center in Thailand, which would dispatch air strikes in response. The sensors were battery-operated and had limited range, so airborne radio relay aircraft orbited above the battle area to pick up the signals and pass them on to the command center.

Originally, the radio relays were Lockheed EC-121 Warning Star aircraft, a military variant of the Lockheed L-1049 Super Constellation four piston engined aircraft, but these machines were expensive to operate. They were replaced by Beech Debonaire single-engine light aircraft, modified for the radio relay role and given the military designation of QU-22A. They could be operated as drones, but apparently nobody trusted that as operational practice, and they were never flown unpiloted except as experiments.

LTV Electrosystems' development effort focused on an endurance aircraft that could be flown as a piloted aircraft or a UAV. A number of prototypes, including piloted and UAV versions, were built and flown. They were based on a Schweizer SGS 2-32 sailplane design with major modifications by Schweizer to accommodate a Pratt & Whitney Canada PT6A-34 turboprop engine, large fuel tanks, and operational payloads. The aircraft had fixed tricycle landing gear.

The first prototype, designated the L-450F, was piloted. It first flew in February 1970, but was lost in an accident on its third flight in March 1970, the pilot bailing out safely. A second L-450F was built and used to complete the flight test program. The third prototype, the first UAV variant, was designated the XQM-93 and flew in early 1972. It had no cockpit or other provisions for piloted flight. It could carry a payload of 320 kilograms (700 pounds). The Air Force ordered four XQM-93s but it is unclear if they were actually delivered, since Compass Dwell was cancelled that year.

== Surviving airframes ==
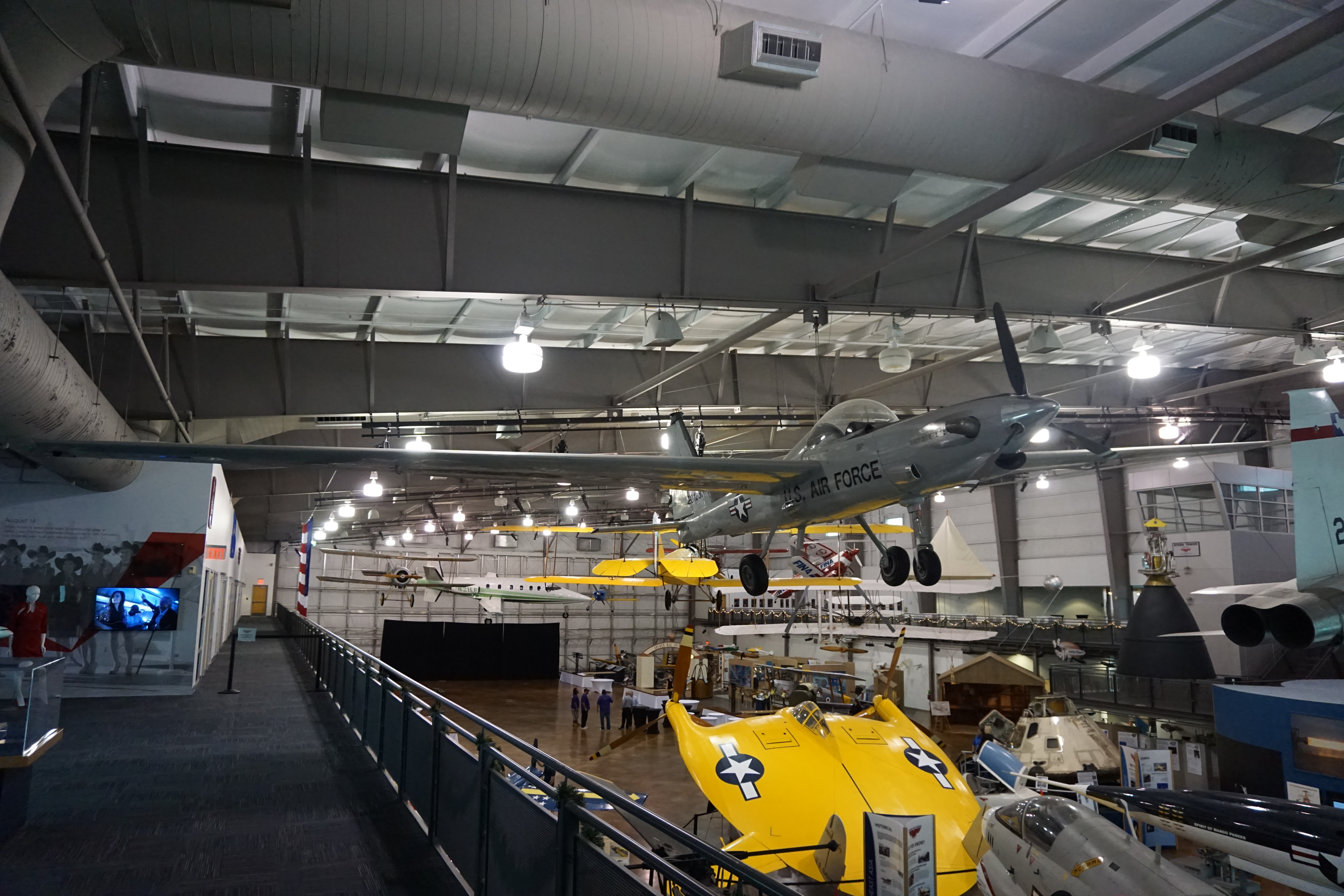
An LTV XQM-93A on display at the Frontiers of Flight Museum

N2450F cn 002 is now on display in the Vintage Flying Museum at Fort Worth Meacham International Airport.

72-1287 is now on display in the Frontiers of Flight Museum at Dallas Love Field Airport.

== Specifications (prototype) ==
Data from Jane's All the World's Aircraft 1973–74

General characteristics

- Length: 29 ft 7 in (9.02 m)
- Wingspan: 57 ft 0 in (17.37 m)
- Height: 10 ft 8 in (3.25 m)
- Empty weight: 2,400 lb (1,089 kg)
- Gross weight: 5,300 lb (2,404 kg)
- Powerplant: 1 × Pratt & Whitney PT6A-34 turboprop engine , 475 hp (354 kW)

Performance

- Cruise speed: 105 mph (170 km/h, 91 kn)
- Stall speed: 70 mph (114 km/h, 61 kn)
- Endurance: 24 hours
- Service ceiling: 50,000 ft (15,240 m)
- Maximum glide ratio: 28
- Rate of climb: 914 ft/min (4.6 m/s)

== See also ==
Related development

- Schweizer 2-32
- LTV L450F

Aircraft of comparable role, configuration, and era

- Beechcraft QU-22 Pave Eagle
- Lockheed YO-3
- Martin Marietta Model 845

Related lists

- List of military aircraft of the United States
