= Texas Aero Corporation =

Defunct American aircraft manufacturer

- Industry: Aircraft manufacturing
- Founded: 1927 in Temple, Texas
- Founders: George W Williams, Jr.; Eric Agar Locking; George A Carroll
- Defunct: August 1930
- Fate: Ceased production
- Headquarters: Temple, Texas, United States
- Products: Passenger and mail light aircraft

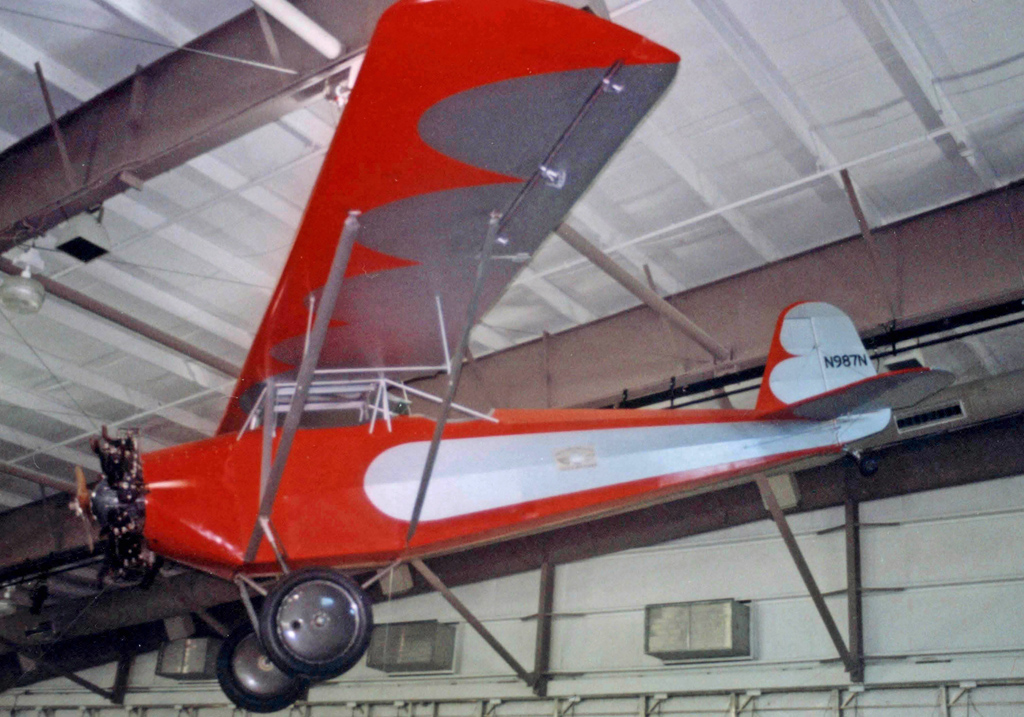
Texas-Temple Sportsman

The Texas Aero Corporation of Temple, Texas, was formed about 1927 to construct passenger and mail light aircraft. The company's origin can be traced back to George W. Williams Texas Aero Manufacturing Company of 1911.

== Origins ==
=== George W Williams, Jr. ===
George Williams was a pioneer aviator who lived in Temple. He had built and flow his own monoplane called the Prairie Queen in 1910. Williams had been experimenting with aircraft design from at least 1908. Williams first aviation company was the Texas Aero Manufacturing Company, formed in 1911, which became in turn George Williams Airplane and Manufacturing Company in 1920. Williams also wrote articles on aviation for the Scientific American.

Williams, aged 45, died in an air crash in August 1930, while training Clyde Moore, a student pilot. The plane had stalled at low altitude and crashed 3 miles (4.8 km) west of Temple near the hospital dairy farm.

=== Eric Agar Locking ===
Eric Locking was born on January 4, 1894, in Wandsworth, London, England. He joined the Royal Flying Corps in January 1918 and served with them until the end of 1919. He attained the rank of 2nd Lieutenant. Locking was based at Talliferro Airfield near Fort Worth at the end of the war. The airfield had been set up by the Royal Flying Corp to train American airmen. Locking was considered one of the best pilots in America at the time.

He moved to Temple after the war and took charge of flying the Temple Daily Telegrams two aircraft. While there he joined the Williams' Temple Aero Club. Locking left the Club in 1921 to set up the Abilene Aviation Company in Abilene, Texas, with J W Locking, his brother, and A Locking, his father. The company aimed to carry passengers, give flying exhibitions, undertake aerial advertising, and make general sales. Locking was the Chief Pilot and Instructor.

He died on May 8, 1921, in Abilene, also in a plane crash.

=== Temple Aero Club ===
In 1911 Williams and others formed the Temple Aero Club. The club was based at Woodlawn Field, Temple, Texas. Its officers in 1920 were President, Eldon Kent Williams (Williams' newspaperman brother); Secretary-Treasurer, George W Williams; and Field Manager, Lieutenant Eric A Locking, ex RAF.

The club had its own airship in 1920. It offered flying lessons, passenger flights, aerial photography, stunt flying, and aerial advertising.

In October 1927 the Aero Club changed its charter to form the Texas Aero Corporation. Its purpose was to manufacture aircraft in Temple. At the time the Corporation commenced it had orders for six aircraft.

=== George A Carroll ===
James Albert Jackson Carroll (aka George A Carroll), was born on April 4, 1902, in Belton, Texas, and died on July 17, 1987, in Tujunga, California. Carroll had joined with the Williams' to found the Texas Aero Corporation. the first commercial aircraft fabricating facility in Texas.

== Texas Aero Corporation ==
To increase the Corporation's capital in June 1929 it offered 100,000 shares at $10 per share in 1929. A 4-acre site was acquired at Love Field, Dallas for a new factory to replace its Temple facility.

=== Aircraft ===
George Williams and Carroll designed and built the Texas Monoplane. In total 12 aircraft were constructed between 1928 and 1930 when the Corporation ended. The models known to be constructed were:

Temple Aero Club

- Prototype (1926) with an 80 hp (later 120 hp) Le Rhône rotary designed by Carroll and George Williams.

Texas Aero Corporation - planes registered as Texas-Temple and Temple

- Commercial-Wing (1927) with a 220 hp Wright J-5. Its specifications were: wing span: 39'4", length: 25'10", range: 550 miles, ceiling: 18,500 ft. The plane cost $10,500 with an inertia starter, brakes and metal prop. Four planes were made with the Wright engine (c/n 101 registration NC173, c/n 102 registration NC2506, c/n 104 registration NC5185, c/n 105 registration NC138N), one with a Hisso (c/n 103 - registration NC3801), and one with a 100 hp Curtis OXX-6. This later one could be a Sportsmans or the NC6525 registration aircraft.
- Aero C-4 (1928), possibly powered by a Wright J-5B engine. It was designed to carry 4 passengers in an enclosed cabin with the pilot in an open cockpit behind the wing. (c/n X-101, registration NC-7458)
- Speed-Wing (1928) carried 1 passenger and was a Commercial-Wing for carrying mail. It took a 500 lb payload over a 500-mile range. The plane cost $9,500. It was advertised as a 1 or 2 person sportplane. The first plane was powered by a 150 hp Hisso A engine and had a 39'4" wingspan. No registration found, but it could be the Commercial-Wing registration NC3801 above.
- Sport or Sportsman (1929) was powered by a 100 hp Cirrus Mk III. (c/n S 101 - registration NC480)(c/n - registration NC852H)
- Trimotor (1929)designed by Carroll and was noted as being test flown by Williams on 5 October 1929. It was to be powered by three 60 hp Velie and used as a photographic survey plane. On 6 October the plane was flown to San Antonio for use by West Texas oilman Joe Palmer of the Texas Pacific Coal and Oil Company of Fort Worth.
- Glider (year unknown) (c/n G-1 registration NC-63W)
- Unidentified type c/n A-1 registration NC6525, which had the same registration as a Curtiss JN-4C. One on-line copy of the FAA register contains a suggestion that this may have been a Curtiss rebuilt by the Corporation. No proof is given. It could be the Commercial Wing with the Curtiss OXX engine.

== Demise ==
George Williams, who was one of the principal drivers of the Corporation, was killed in an air crash while on a training flight with a learner pilot in August 1930. The Corporation folded as a result.

One Texas-Temple Sportsman still exists. It had been found in bits by an airplane restorer, Jerry D Ferrell, who reconstructed it. The plane undertook its airworthiness test on July 26, 1990. Ferrel donated the plane for display at the Frontiers of Flight Museum, Love Field, Dallas, Texas. The plane is fitted with a Clyde Cessna modified engine, the Anzani.

A commemorative plaque was placed by the State of Texas on the site of the Corporation's original hangar in 1970. The plaque was replaced and relocated in 2010 because of a change to the adjacent interstate.
