= Schweizer X-26 Frigate =

X-plane programs

X-26 Frigate
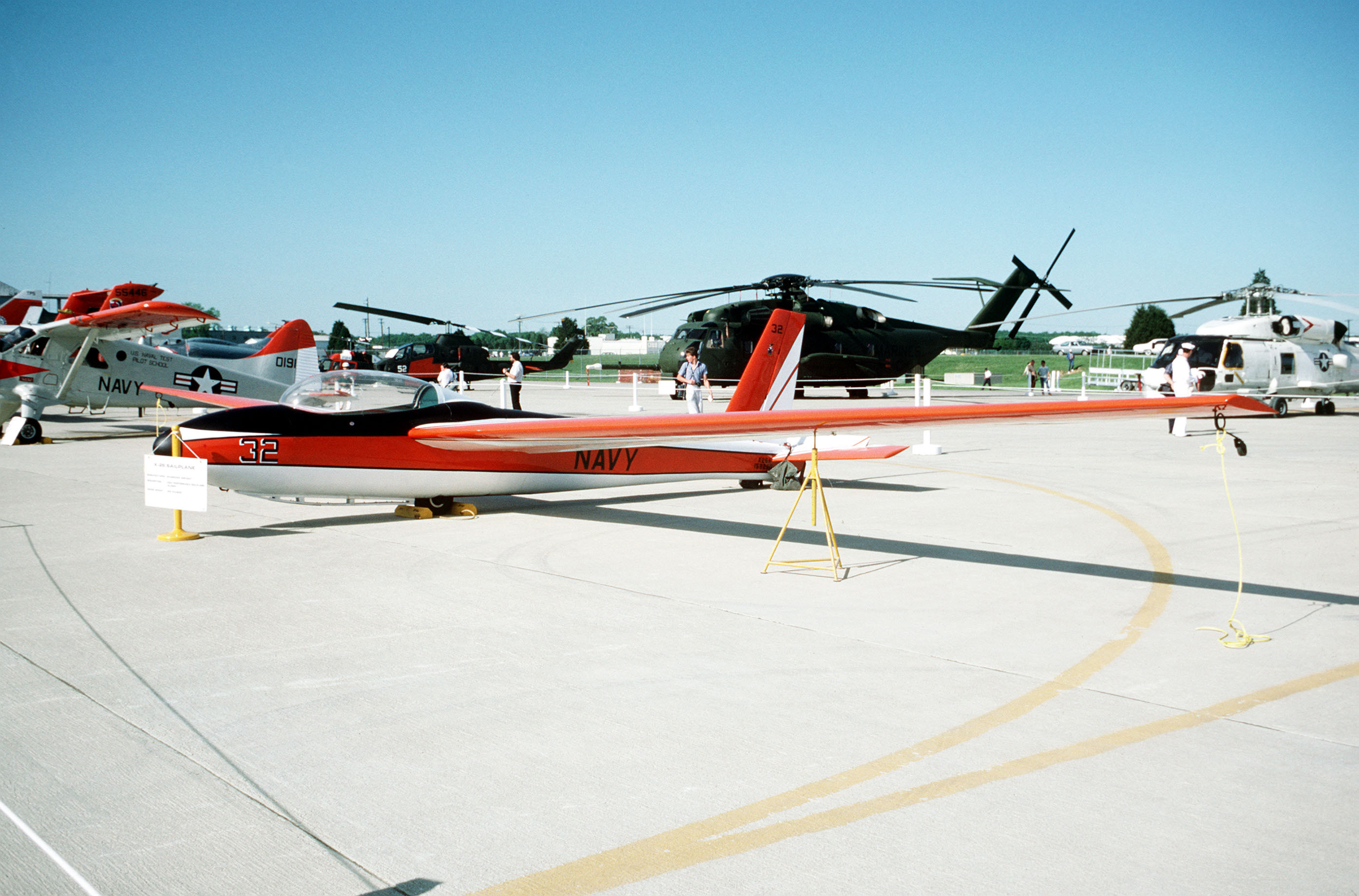
- An X-26A sailplane on display at the 1984 NAS Patuxent River Air Show

General information
- Type: Research and training aircraft
- National origin: United States
- Manufacturer: Schweizer
- Designer: Ernie and William Schweizer
- Primary user: United States Navy
- Number built: 7?

History
- First flight: July 1967
- Developed from: Schweizer SGS 2-32

The X-26 Frigate is the longest-lived of the X-plane programs. The program included the X-26A Frigate sailplane and the motorized X-26B Quiet Thruster versions: QT-2, QT-2PC, and QT-2PCII. All were based on the Schweizer SGS 2-32 sailplane.

== Development ==
The X-26A was used by the United States Navy to train test pilots in the condition of yaw/roll coupling. Since jet trainers were known to be dangerous in this condition, the X-26 was based on the Schweizer SGS 2-32 sailplane. Sailplanes react much slower and are easier to control than jet aircraft, making the X-26 a much safer training platform. Four aircraft were originally ordered. Three of the original planes crashed. The Navy purchased a replacement for each of the crashed units.

== Operational history ==
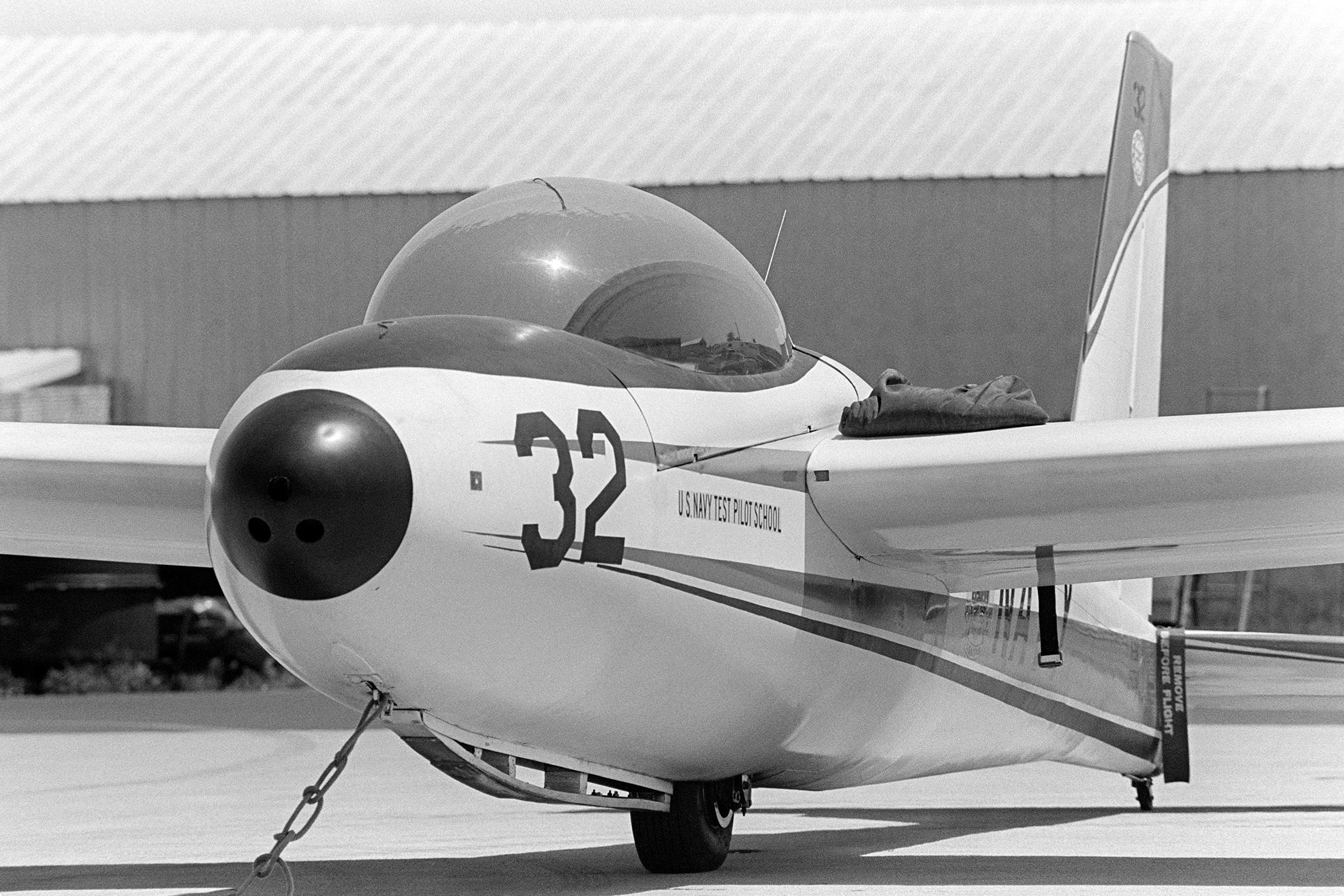
X-26 glider circa 1983

Two Schweizer 2-32s, 67-15345 and 67-15346, from the U.S. Naval Test Pilot School X-26 Program, were modified to QT-2 configuration (QT for Quiet Thruster) by the Lockheed Missiles & Space Company and civil registered as N2471W and N2472W. In 1967 the aircraft were modified by adding a Continental O-200 engine, V-Belt RPM reduction system, four-bladed Fahlin fixed pitch wooden propeller, and associated airframe upgrades.

After demonstrating quiet flight, the aircraft were again modified to military QT-2PC configuration, known only as Tail Numbers "1" and "2", with avionics and camouflage for night operation. They were successfully evaluated in Southeast Asia under the Prize Crew OpEval program for covert ("stealthy") tactical airborne observation in the spring of 1968 (during Têt). The two QT-2PCs were returned to the Test Pilot School in 1969 and re-designated X-26Bs.

The #1 QT-2PC was re-designated "67-15345" and the #2 aircraft was used for spare parts. The original X-26 glider version was then designated X-26A.

Lockheed continued the covert airborne surveillance program with one Q-Star (House Test Aircraft) and eleven pre-production YO-3As.

== Surviving aircraft ==
QT-2PC, QT-2PCII, and X-26B
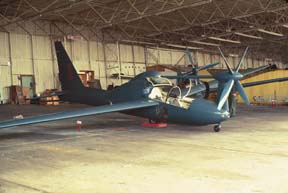
- QT-2PC #1 in the Soc Trang, RVN Army Airfield Hangar in 1968

General information
- Type: Experimental Covert Reconnaissance Aircraft
- National origin: United States
- Manufacturer: SACUSA and LMSC
- Designer: 2-32: Bill and Ernie Schweizer; QT-2 and its variants: Stanley Hall
- Status: 1. 1: Unknown. #2 Operational as a glider at Mile High Gliding
- Primary user: Tri-Service (USA, USAF, USN, and USMC)
- Number built: 2 (QT-2 & QT-2PC/X-26B)

History
- Introduction date: 1967
- First flight: QT-2: July, 1967, QT-2PC: Dec, 1967
- Retired: 1969 as X-26B
- Developed from: SGS 2-32

Both of the aircraft from the original QT-2 / X-26B program survive today. The X-26B aircraft known as QT-2 N2471W and QT-2PC #1 is located (as of 2019) in the collection of the US Army Aviation Museum at Ft. Rucker AL. The original N number N2471W was reassigned in 2019 to another Schweizer SGS 2-32 glider, (serial #7, formerly N2758Z) owned by Mile High Gliding of Boulder Colorado.

The second X-26B aircraft known as QT-2 N2472W and QT-2PC #2 was restored to SGS 2-32 configuration and has been operated for many years (and known as "72 Whiskey") for paid scenic rides at Mile High Gliding in Boulder, Colorado.

The Q-Star was the first aircraft to use a rotary combustion chamber (Wankel) engine. It is currently being returned to flight status.

The YO-3As were tactically evaluated in Southeast Asia from mid-1969 to late 1971. They were later used by the Louisiana Dept of Wildlife & Fisheries (LDWF) and the Federal Bureau of Investigation (FBI) in law enforcement, and by NASA for scientific applications.

YO-3A 69-18005 is on display at the Museum of Flight in Seattle, Washington. YO-3A 69-18006 is on display at the Pima Air and Space, Tucson AZ. YO-3A 69-18007 is in storage at the Western Museum of Flight in Torrance, California. As of 2014, YO-3A 69-18010 (NASA 818) is in flyable storage at Armstrong Flight Research Center.

=== Accidents ===
- U.S. Navy 157932 crashed March 1971, pilot killed.
- U.S. Navy 157933 crashed May 18, 1972, pilot killed.

== Specifications (X-26A Frigate) ==
General characteristics

- Crew: two
- Length: 26 ft 9 in (7.92 m)
- Wingspan: 57 ft 1.5 in (17.37 m)
- Height: 9 ft 3 in (2.74 m)
- Wing area: 180 sq ft (16.7 m^{2})
- Empty weight: 857 lb (389 kg)
- Gross weight: 1,430 lb (650 kg)
- Wing aspect ratio: 18

Performance

- Maximum speed: 158 mph (254 km/h, 137 kn)
- Wing loading: 7.9 lb/sq ft (39 kg/m^{2})
- Power/mass: 0.07 hp/lb (0.12 kW/kg)
- Rate of sink: 0.6 m/s (120 ft/min)

== Specifications (X-26B and QT-2PC) ==
General characteristics

- Crew: two
- Length: 30 ft 9 in (9.33 m)
- Wingspan: 57 ft 1.5 in (17.37 m)
- Height: 9 ft 3 in (2.74 m)
- Wing area: 185 sq ft (16.7 m^{2})
- Gross weight: 2,500 lb (1,134 kg)
- Propeller: Ole Fahlin four-blade, 8 inch chord, fixed-pitch 100 inch diameter
- Wing aspect ratio: 18
- Fuel Capacity: 20 gallons (nominal)
- Powerplant: 1 × Continental O-200 horizontally opposed 4-cylinder air-cooled engine, 100 hp (75 kW)

Performance

- Service ceiling: 13,000 ft (4,000 m)
- Rate of climb: 200 ft/min (1.0 m/s)
- Power/mass: hp/lb (kW/kg)
- Flight endurance: Planned = 4+ hours; demonstrated = 6.7+ hours
- Quiet cruise speed: 70 - 80 mph

== See also ==
Related development

- Schweizer SGS 2-32
- Lockheed YO-3 quiet surveillance aircraft
- Ling-Temco-Vought L450F turboprop record setting aircraft

Aircraft of comparable role, configuration, and era

- Scheibe SF25C

Related lists

- List of experimental aircraft
