= LTV L450F =

Prototype quiet reconnaissance aircraft

L450F
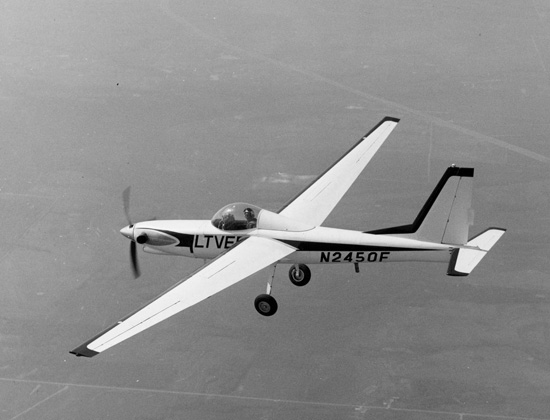

General information
- Type: Reconnaissance aircraft
- Manufacturer: Ling-Temco-Vought
- Primary user: United States Air Force

History
- First flight: February 1970
- Developed from: Schweizer SGS 2-32
- Developed into: LTV XQM-93

The LTV L450F, also known as the L45ØF, is a prototype quiet reconnaissance aircraft, developed by Ling-Temco-Vought in the late 1960s for use in the Vietnam War by the United States. Based on the airframe of a Schweizer 2-32 sailplane, the aircraft flew in 1970, and was developed into the XQM-93 reconnaissance drone before the project was cancelled.

== Design and development ==
Developed as a follow on to the Igloo White program, the L450F was intended to provide a quiet reconnaissance and communications relay aircraft. Under a $1 million USD contract by LTV Electrosystems, the L450F was developed from a Schweizer SGS 2-32 sailplane, modified by Schweizer to LTV's specifications.

These modifications included stronger wing spars, thicker wing skin, installation of a Pratt & Whitney PT6A turboprop engine driving a three-bladed propeller, and main landing gear based on that of the Grumman Ag-Cat agricultural aircraft. An alternative configuration, using a piston engine, was also proposed.

The prototype L450F first flew in February 1970, but was destroyed during its third flight, on 23 March that year, the pilot successfully bailing out. A second prototype was then completed and flown, successfully completing the testing program, and a third prototype was ordered as the unmanned XQM-93 drone, under the Compass Dwell project. Four examples of the XQM-93 were contracted for by the United States Air Force, however the Compass Dwell project was subsequently cancelled.

== Operational history ==
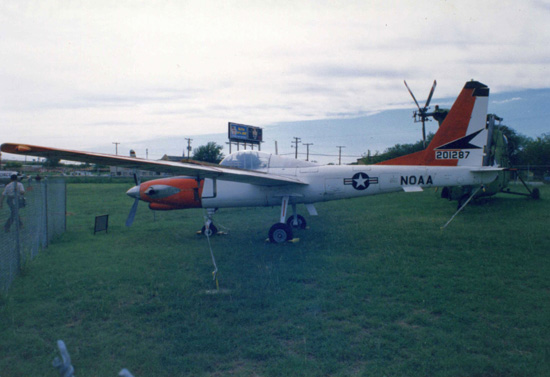
The second L450F on display

27 March 1972 Donald R. Wilson reached the altitude of 15,456 m (50,708 ft) in horizontal flight flying the remaining L450F, registered N2450F, setting a new Fédération Aéronautique Internationale international record, Class C-1c, Group II (Powered aeroplanes, takeoff weight 1000 to 1750 kg, turboprop). This record still stood as of 27 March 2012.

== Specifications (prototype) ==
Data from Janes

General characteristics

- Crew: 1 (pilot)
- Length: 29 ft (8.8 m)
- Wingspan: 57 ft (17 m)
- Empty weight: 2,400 lb (1,089 kg)
- Max takeoff weight: 4,600 lb (2,087 kg)
- Fuel capacity: 2,300 pounds (1,000 kg)
- Powerplant: 1 × Pratt & Whitney PT6A-29 , 778 shp (580 kW)
- Propellers: 3-bladed Hartzell

Performance

- Cruise speed: 105 mph (169 km/h, 91 kn)
- Range: 6,000 mi (9,650 km, 5,210 nmi)
- Endurance: 24–30 hours
- Service ceiling: 52,000 ft (16,000 m)
- Maximum glide ratio: 28:1
- Rate of climb: 2,600 ft/min (13 m/s)

== See also ==
Related development

- Schweizer 2-32
- LTV XQM-93

Aircraft of comparable role, configuration, and era

- Beechcraft QU-22 Pave Eagle
- Lockheed YO-3
- Martin Marietta Model 845

Related lists

- List of military aircraft of the United States
