= Vintage Flying Museum =

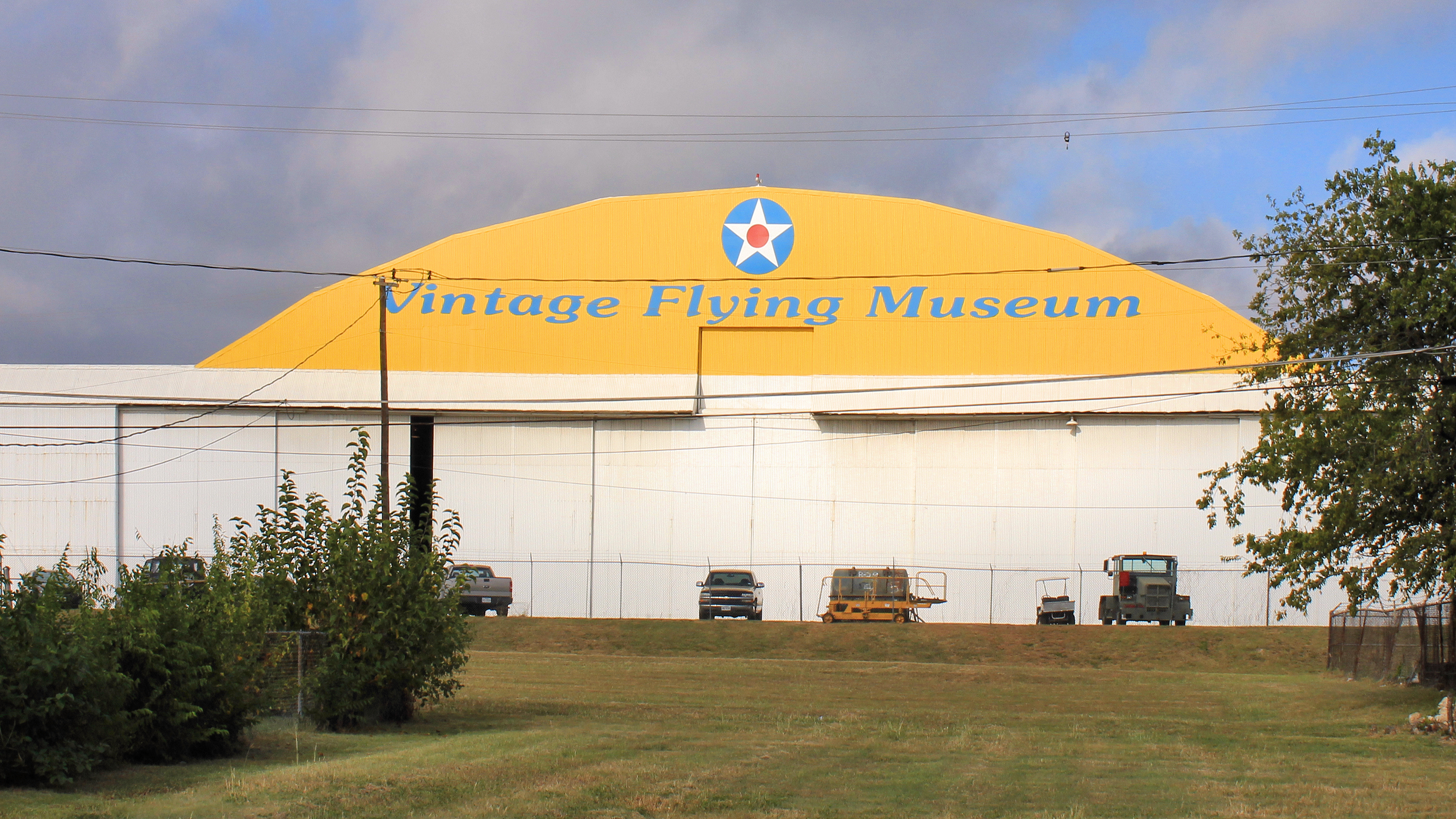

- Location within Texas
- Established: 1993
- Location: Meacham International Airport, Fort Worth, Texas
- Coordinates: 32.8126°N 97.3558°W
- Type: Aviation museum
- Founder: William “Doc” Hospers
- Website: www.vintageflyingmuseum.org

The Vintage Flying Museum is a nonprofit aviation museum located at Meacham International Airport, Fort Worth, Texas. The primary mission of the museum is to preserve America's flying heritage in word, deed, and action. Also located at the museum is Greatest Generation Aircraft, the Invader Squadron of the Commemorative Air Force, the Fort Worth Chapter of the American Rosie the Riveter Association and PGM Aviation.

== History ==
The museum was founded in 1988 when William "Doc" Hospers bought a B-17.

In October 2010, the museum sold its B-17, Chuckie, to the Military Aviation Museum in Virginia Beach, Virginia.

In 2019, the museum acquired a Beech 18 that was previously owned by Jackie Cochrane.

== Programs ==
The museum provides educational programs that include aviation summer camps for middle- and high-school students, and Take Flight Days, which are programs for elementary-school students.

== Aircraft on display ==
The museum's collection includes:

- Aeronca 11 Chief
- Aeronca L-3B
- American Flea
- Beechcraft E18S
- Beechcraft TC-45G Expeditor
- Boeing-Stearman PT-27
- Cessna 140
- Cessna U-3
- Culver Cadet LFA-90
- Douglas B-26K Counter Invader
- Douglas C-49J
- Douglas EA-3B Skywarrior – on loan
- Knight Falcon
- Lockheed T-33
- LTV L450F
- Morrissey 2000
- North American F-86F Sabre
- North American Harvard III
- Piasecki CH-21B Workhorse – on loan
- Piaggio P.136 Royal Gull
- Ryan PT-22 Recruit
- Stinson L-5E Sentinel – on loan
- Stinson Reliant

The museum also hosts aircraft from the B-29/B-24 and Invader Squadrons of the Commemorative Air Force when they are not out touring the country:

- Boeing B-29 Superfortress Fifi
- Douglas A-26 Invader

== See also ==
- Fort Worth Aviation Museum
