= Texas-Temple Sportsman =

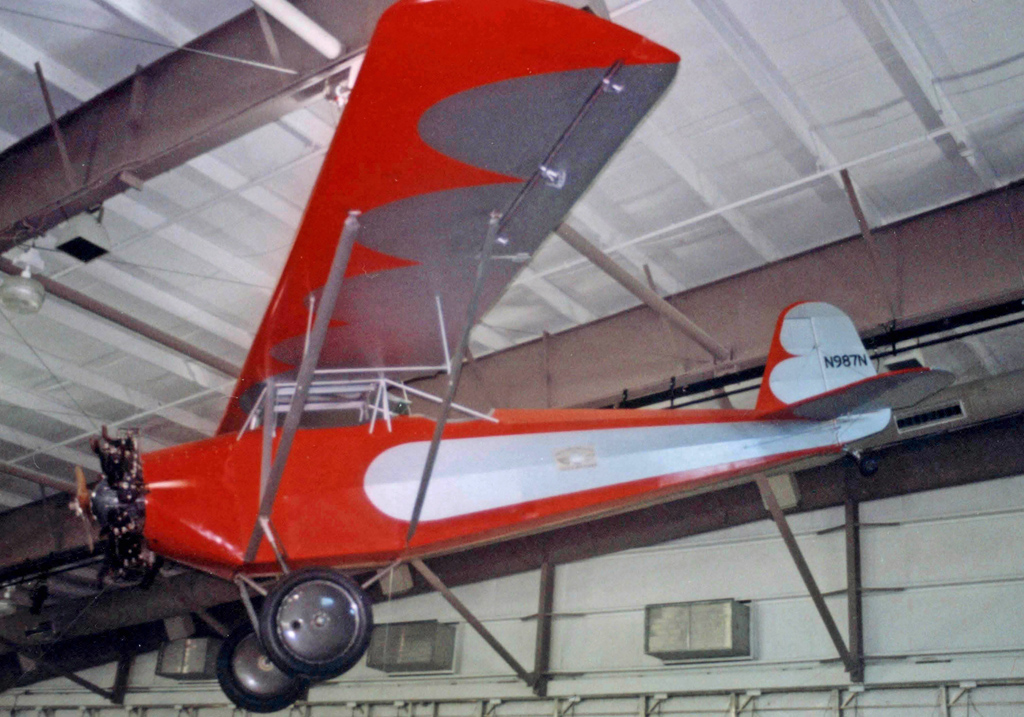
- The sole surviving Sportsman monoplane on display at the Frontiers of Flight Museum at Dallas, Texas

General information
- Type: sporting monoplane
- National origin: United States
- Manufacturer: Texas Aero Corporation
- Designer: George W Williams and George Carroll
- Status: one example preserved
- Primary user: private pilot owners
- Number built: 3

History
- Manufactured: 1928
- First flight: 1928

The Texas-Temple Sportsman is an American-built light single-seat high-wing sporting monoplane of the late 1920s.

== Design and development ==
The Texas Aero Corporation of Temple, Texas was formed about 1927 to construct passenger and mail light aircraft. The companies origin can be traced back to George W Williams Texas Aero Manufacturing Company of 1911. It built a series of aircraft designs including the Texas-Temple Sportsman.

The Sportsman was a parasol winged monoplane, equipped with two seats arranged in tandem. The cockpit had an open layout. A fixed tail-wheel undercarriage was fitted. The tailplane was set low on the fin. A 100 h.p. Cirrus III was initially fitted.

== Operational history ==
Three examples of the Sportsman were completed: NC480 manufacturers number 1; NC852H and N987N manufacturers number 107. There was no N987N registered in FAA records at the time, so it is likely to be from a later registration. There was an NC987H, but that was the registration for a different make of aircraft, a Smith S-1 with a Velie engine. The Sportsman was suitable for operation by individual sporting pilots. Williams was killed during 1930 in the crash while flying with a trainee pilot. The company folded after the accident.

== Surviving aircraft ==
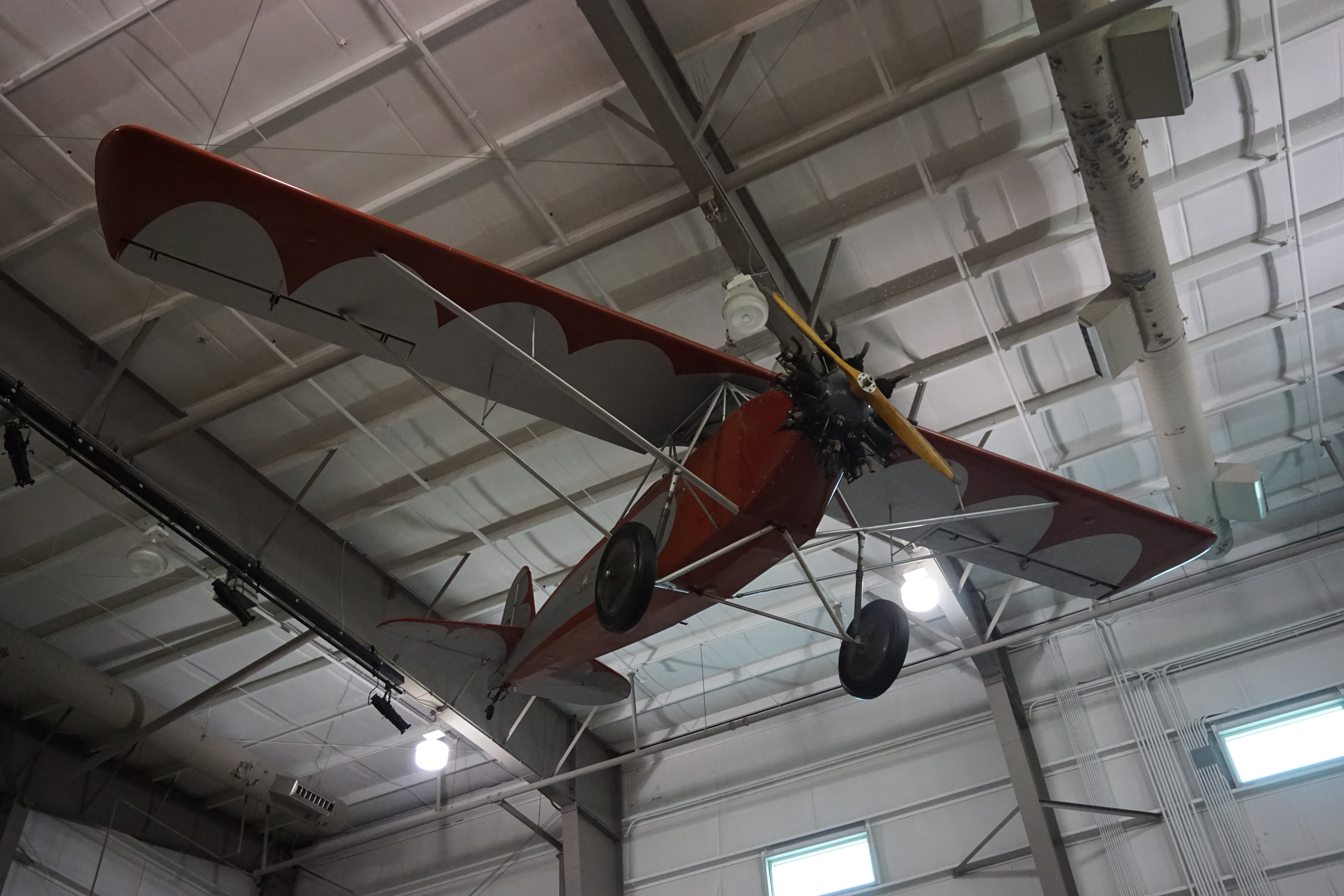
The Texas-Temple Sportsman on display at the Frontiers of Flight Museum

The third Sportsman survived the Second World War and was rebuilt in 1990 by J.D. Ferrel with a radial engine of unknown manufacture. It is still extant, but without a valid permit to fly. N987N is publicly displayed (2007) in the Frontiers of Flight Museum at Dallas (Love Field) airport.

== Specifications ==
Not available. The aircraft was originally fitted with a 100 h.p. ADC Cirrus III engine. General characteristics Performance
