= William E. Cooper (civic leader) =

William Edward "Bill" Cooper
- Born: October 16, 1921; United States, Wichita, Kansas
- Died: March 6, 2008 (aged 86); United States, Dallas, Texas
- Occupations: aviator, business and civic leader

William Edward "Bill" Cooper (October 16, 1921 – March 6, 2008) was a prominent Dallas businessman and civic leader.

== Biography ==
Born in Wichita, Kansas, Cooper worked nights at Beech Aircraft while also attending the Municipal University of Wichita (now Wichita State University).

Cooper enlisted in the Army Air Corps during World War II and trained as a B-17 pilot. He became a B-29 co-pilot and served in Guam, flying transport for the prisoner of war missions and other cargo missions. He also flew as co-pilot to the Chief test pilot of the 315th Bomb Wing and as 1st pilot on all test hope of B-17 and C-45 types of military aircraft and had approximately 750 military flying hours.

After being honorably discharged, May 1946, Cooper returned to college, and completed his economics degree in 1948.

Cooper worked for a color printing company in Wichita and was transferred to Dallas in 1952. "Mr. Cooper's commission checks soon became bigger than his boss' salary," according to The Dallas Morning News. In 1958, the chairman sent a registered letter ordering Mr. Cooper back to Kansas. 'I wrote him a registered letter and said "no,"' Cooper said, 'When you do that, that's it.'"

== Dallas Market Center ==
After meeting Trammell Crow, one of Dallas' leading real estate agents, Cooper became deeply involved in Dallas' development as a wholesale merchandising center. Crow appointed him vice president of the Dallas Market Center in 1958, and, according to The Dallas Morning News was "instrumental in the planning, operation and expansion of the Dallas Market Center, considered the largest wholesale merchandise mart in the world.

Cooper was the president of the Dallas Market Center from 1969 to 1982. In those 25 years, the Dallas Market Center grew from a single building with less than 100,000 square feet (9,300 m^{2}) to 7,200,000-square-foot (670,000 m^{2}) complex of six buildings and a 1,000-room hotel according to the newspaper. Cooper is credited for the use of The Dallas Market Center Apparel Mart as "Great Hall" in the film Logan's Run (1975).

== Frontiers of Flight Museum ==
In November 1988, Cooper, Kay Bailey Hutchison and Jan Collmer founded the Frontiers of Flight Museum in Dallas, Texas. Originally located within a terminal at Dallas Love Field, the museum now occupies a 100,000-square-foot (9,300 m^{2}) building at the Southeast corner of Love Field on Lemmon Avenue.

George E. Haddaway, aviation historian, promoted the founding of the museum subsequent to donation of his extensive personal collection of aviation history books, journals, photographs and archives to the University of Texas at Dallas as the nucleus of one of the world's finest aviation collections, the History of Aviation Collection.

The museum is now home to an extensive collection of artifacts as well as a cross-section of private, commercial, military and aerospace vehicles.

== Dallas-Fort Worth International Airport ==
Cooper played a prominent role in D/FW Airport from its inception. In 1986 he was named to the airport's board of directors and was board chairman from 1991 to 1993.

He was past Chairman of the DFW International Airport and past Chairman of the Dallas Council on World Affairs and a dozen other civic and professional organizations.

== Civic Activities ==
Cooper served on the City of Dallas Economic Advisory Board and as Chairman of various Dallas Chamber of Commerce and Dallas Citizens Council Committees. He served as National Chairman of the Export Expansion Council, President of the Hope Cottage Children's Bureau, Chairman of the North Texas Commission Aviation Council and Director of the Better Business Bureau, Dallas County Community College District, University of Texas Southwestern Medical Center, Parkland Foundation, St. Paul Hospital Foundation and many other such organizations.

Cooper established The Mary E. Mancini Award to recognize excellence in nursing and with his wife, Suzanne, established The Sue and Bill Cooper Cardiac Rehabilitation Center.

Cooper joined The Rotary Club of Dallas on July 9, 1962 and served on many committees and hosted many Rotary events such as the 1967 District Conference as well as the 1982 RI Convention in Dallas. He was elected President of The Rotary Club of Dallas in June 1973. April 2008

Cooper was also active in the Catholic lay community. The Jesuit Foundation named him as the 1991 recipient of The Patrick H. Koch, S.J. Award, given to an individual, couple or group "that exemplify the Jesuit spirit of service to others." In 2004, he was part of a group demanding the resignation of Dallas Bishop Charles Grahmann.

Cooper been honored with awards from Wichita State University, The National Conference of Christians and Jews, The Dallas Urban League and twelve others.

Cooper died in Dallas, Texas, March 6, 2008, from congestive heart failure.

== Awards ==
Cooper was awarded the H. Neil Mallon Award by the World Affairs Council in 1985. The H. Neil Mallon Award, hosted by the World Affair Council of Dallas/ Fort Worth, is presented annually to individuals who have excelled at promoting the international focus of North Texas. The prestigious Mallon Award is named after the Council’s founder and is presented annually to individuals who have excelled in promoting our region’s international profile. Funds raised from this event support the World Affair Council’s public and education programming, international exchanges, and diplomatic services.
