= N.V. Vliegtuigbouw 013 Sagitta =

Dutch glider

013 Sagitta
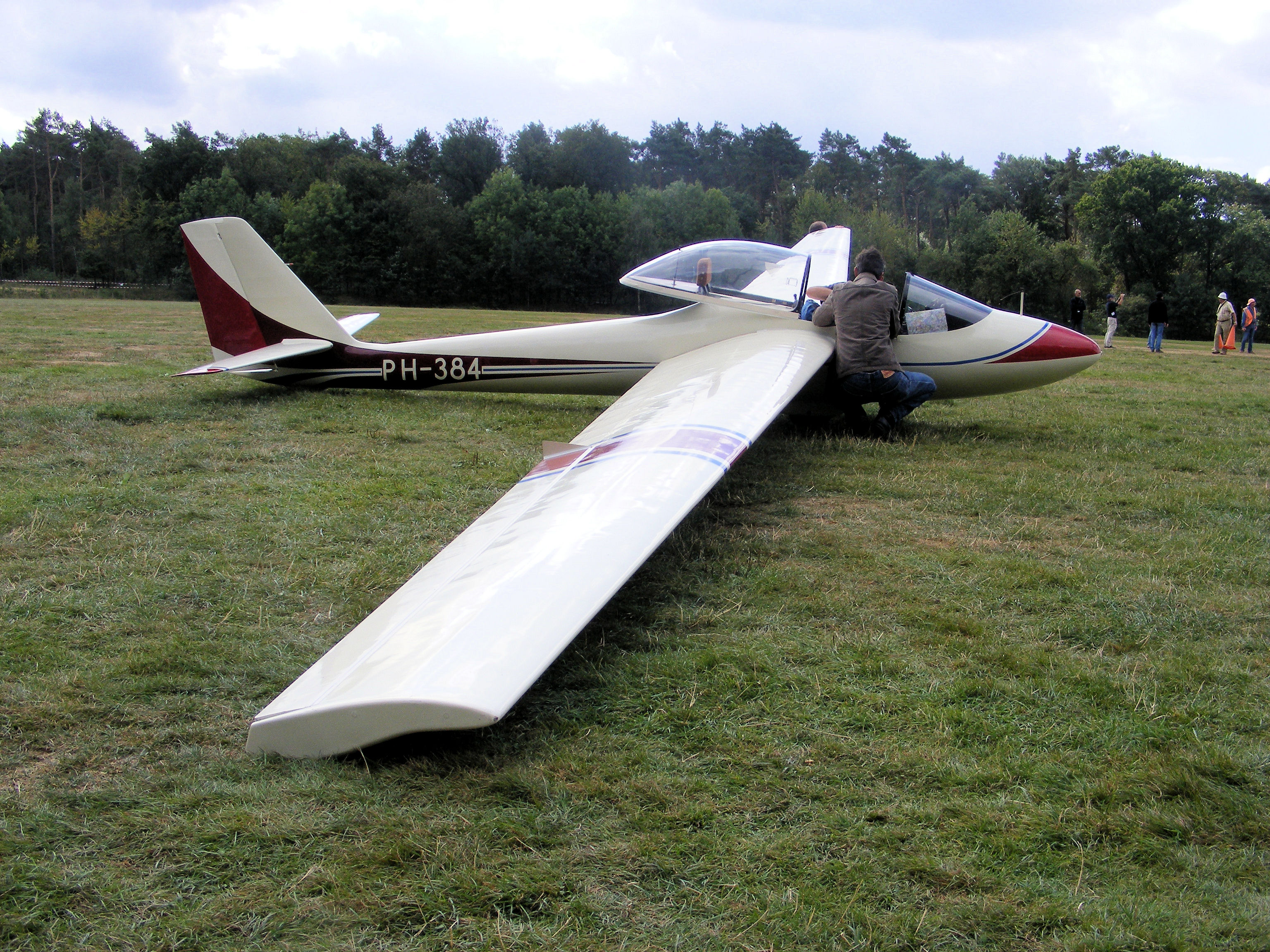

General information
- Type: Standard-class sailplane
- National origin: Netherlands
- Manufacturer: N.V. Vliegtuigbouw
- Designer: Piet Alsema
- Status: Production completed
- Number built: 20

History
- First flight: 4 July 1960

The N.V. Vliegtuigbouw 013 Sagitta (English: Arrow) is a Dutch mid-wing, single-seat Standard Class glider designed by Piet Alsema and produced by N.V. Vliegtuigbouw.

The aircraft is reported by different sources under a variety of different names and designations. Sources label it the Alsema Sagitta, Vliegtuigbouw Sagitta, N.V. Vliegtuigbouw 013 Sagitta, Dutch Sagitta, N.V. Vliegtuigbouw Sagitta 013 and N.V. Vliegtuigbouw Sagitta-013. The US type certificate erroneously lists it as the N.V. VLIEGTUIGBOUW Segitta (sic) 013 and catalogs it in their database under Vilegtuigbouw (sic), N.V., 013.

== Design and development ==
The Sagitta was designed by Alsema between 1957-61 specifically for the then-new FAI Standard Class. Like other early standard class gliders it was quickly surpassed in performance by newer fibreglass aircraft.

The Sagitta has a wooden structure. The fuselage is covered with plywood, the wings and tail surfaces with plywood and doped aircraft fabric covering. The 15.0 m (49.2 ft) span wing features top and bottom air brakes and employs NACA 63-618 airfoil at the wing root, and a NACA 4412 section at the wing tip. The controls are automatically connected on assembly. The bubble canopy slides aft for cockpit access and can be locked open in several positions in flight. The landing gear is a fixed monowheel.

In the Netherlands the aircraft was certified for cloud flying and aerobatics, but its US certification does not include these authorizations. The type received its US type certificate on 2 August 1965.

Twenty Sagittas were built.

== Operational history ==
In July 2011 six Sagittas were still registered with the US Federal Aviation Administration.

== Variants ==
Sagitta
Prototype first flown on 4 July 1960.
Sagitta 2
FAI Standard Class model with 15.0 m (49.2 ft) wingspan.
Super Sagitta
FAI Open Class model with 17.0 m (55.8 ft) wingspan

== Aircraft on display ==
- Aviodrome, Lelystad Airport, Netherlands

== Specifications (Sagitta) ==
Data from Sailplane Directory, Soaring and FAA type certificate G7eu The World's Sailplanes:Die Segelflugzeuge der Welt:Les Planeurs du Monde Volume II

General characteristics

- Crew: one
- Length: 6.465 m (21 ft 3 in)
- Wingspan: 15.0 m (49 ft 3 in)
- Wing area: 12.000 m^{2} (129.17 sq ft)
- Aspect ratio: 18.7:1
- Airfoil: Root: NACA 63_{3}618, tip: NACA 4412
- Empty weight: 217 kg (478 lb)
- Gross weight: 320 kg (705 lb)

Performance

- Stall speed: 66 km/h (41 mph, 36 kn)
- Never exceed speed: 270 km/h (170 mph, 150 kn)
- Rough air speed max: 200 km/h (124.3 mph; 108.0 kn)
- Aerotow speed: 140 km/h (87.0 mph; 75.6 kn)
- Winch launch speed: 120 km/h (74.6 mph; 64.8 kn)
- Terminal velocity: with full airbrakes 220 km/h (137 mph; 119 kn)
- g limits: +8 -5.5 at 270 km/h (167.8 mph; 145.8 kn)
- Maximum glide ratio: 34:1 at 97 km/h (60.3 mph; 52.4 kn)
- Rate of sink: 0.64 m/s (126 ft/min) at 78 km/h (48.5 mph; 42.1 kn)
- Wing loading: 26.7 kg/m^{2} (5.5 lb/sq ft)

== See also ==
Aircraft of comparable role, configuration, and era

- Schweizer SGS 1-34

Related lists

- List of gliders
