= Meyer's Little Toot =

George W. Meyer's biplane

Little Toot
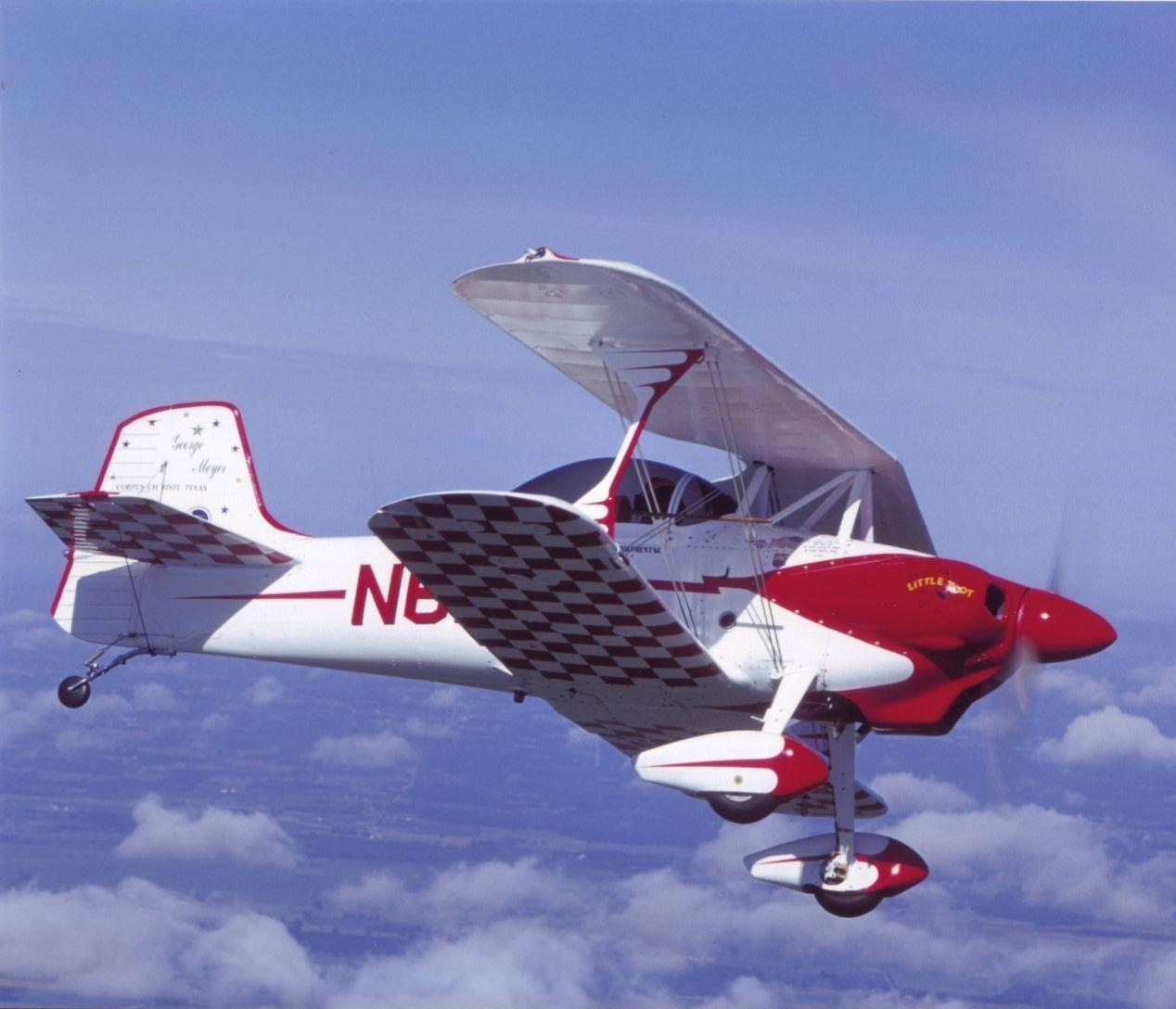

General information
- Type: Homebuilt aircraft
- National origin: United States
- Manufacturer: Meyer Aircraft
- Designer: George W. Meyer
- Primary user: Thomas R. Meyer
- Number built: 1
- Registration: N61G

History
- First flight: 1957

Meyer's Little Toot is a homebuilt biplane that was designed by George W. Meyer (1916–1982) of Corpus Christi, Texas.

== Design and development ==
Design of the original Little Toot was started by George Meyer in 1952. Along with drawings, a scale model was built of the aircraft during the design phase. It was designed with aerobatics in mind and is stressed for 10g+/- loads.

The Little Toot is a single seat, open cockpit, biplane with conventional landing gear. Its design accommodates an optional cockpit canopy. The fuselage is welded steel tubing aluminum covering. The original tail section is a metal monocoque truss section from a Luscome 8A. The wings use spruce spars with wooden ribs and are fabric covered. The upper wing is swept back eight degrees. The lower wing has 2.5 degrees of dihedral with nearly full-length ailerons. The landing gear and wheel pants were sourced from a Cessna 140 tail-dragger. The production cost of the original Little Toot aircraft was US$2,000 in 1958.

The aircraft was named Little Toot after the tugboat that liked doing figure eights in a Disney movie, itself based on a children's story written and illustrated by Hardie Gramatky.

== Operational history ==
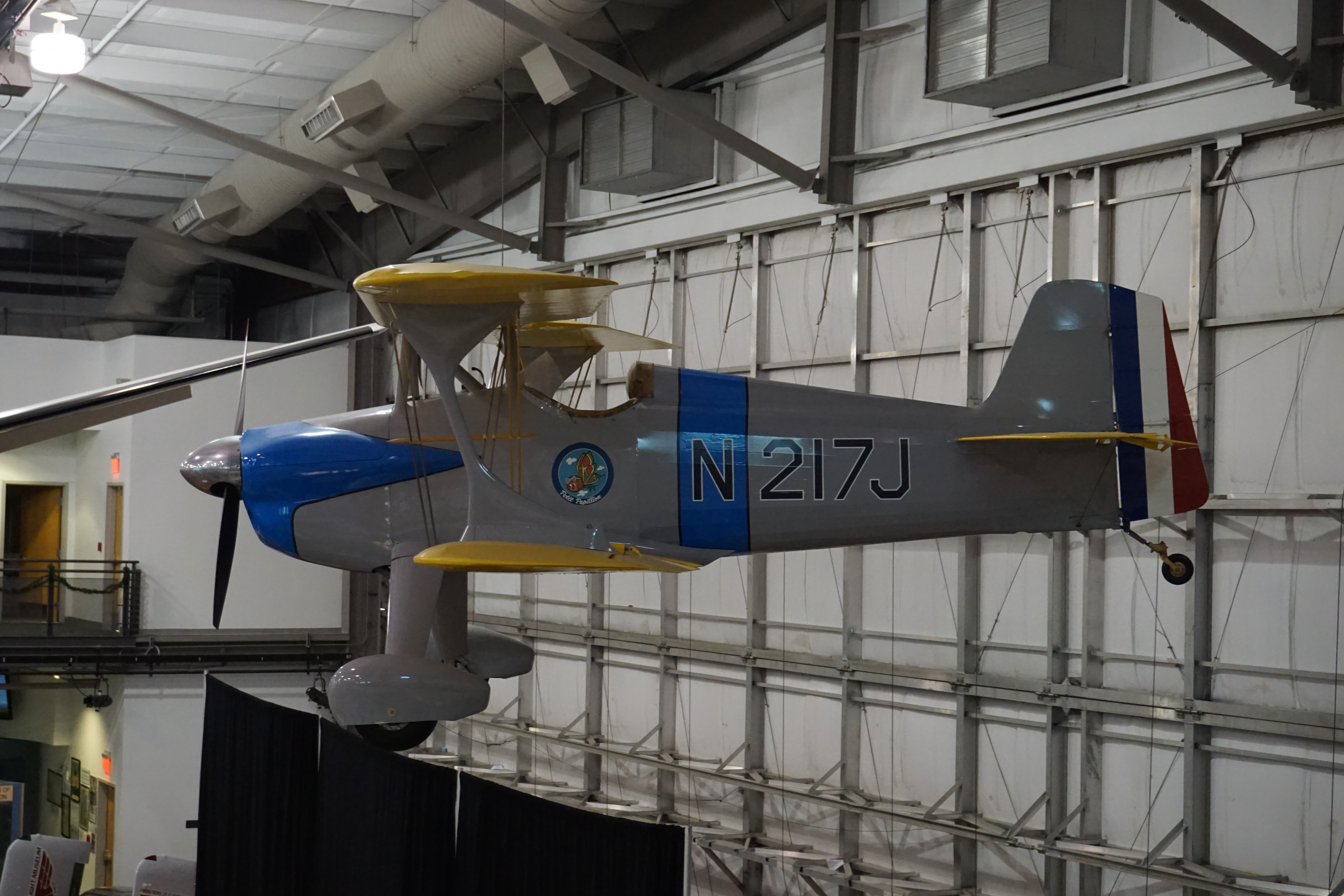
A Little Toot on display at the Frontiers of Flight Museum

The Little Toot prototype was first displayed at the 1957 Experimental Aircraft Association convention in Milwaukee, Wisconsin. At this event, Little Toot, N61G, won the Mechanix Illustrated Trophy for Outstanding Achievement, First Place and Second Place for Outstanding Design. EAA founder Paul Poberezny flew Little Toot several times.

== Specifications ==
Data from Meyer Aircraft

General characteristics

- Capacity: 1
- Length: 16 ft 6 in (5.03 m)
- Upper wingspan: 19 ft (5.8 m)
- Lower wingspan: 19 ft (5.8 m)
- Height: 7 ft 0 in (2.13 m)
- Wing area: 123.9 sq ft (11.51 m^{2})
- Airfoil: NACA 2212
- Empty weight: 914 lb (415 kg)
- Gross weight: 1,320 lb (599 kg)
- Fuel capacity: 19
- Powerplant: 1 × Lycoming O-290 up to Lycoming O-360 Horizontally Opposed Piston, 125–180 hp (93–134 kW)
- Propellers: 2-bladed

Performance

- Maximum speed: 135 mph (217 km/h, 117 kn)
- Cruise speed: 125 mph (201 km/h, 109 kn)
- Stall speed: 48 mph (77 km/h, 42 kn)
- Range: 260 mi (420 km, 230 nmi)
- g limits: +10g -10g
- Rate of climb: 1,600 ft/min (8.1 m/s)

== See also ==
Aircraft of comparable role, configuration, and era

- Pitts Special
