= Ryson STP-1 Swallow =

STP-1 Swallow

General information
- Type: Experimental two-seat powered cruising sailplane
- National origin: United States
- Manufacturer: Ryson Aviation Corporation
- Number built: 1

History
- First flight: 1972

The Ryson STP-1 Swallow is an American experimental two-seat powered cruising sailplane designed and built by the Ryson Aviation Corporation to be license built by other companies.

== Design and development ==
The design of the Swallow was started in 1970 with the prototype completed during 1971, it was test flown from 1972. The Swallow is a cantilever mid-wing monoplane, the name is derived from the distinctive tail unit, it has a pusher propeller located between twin fins and rudders. The 76 hp (57 kW) Barking converted Volkswagen motor-car engine is mounted mid-fuselage and drives the two-bladed variable-pitch fully feathering pusher propeller using a 5 ft (1.52 m) tubular shaft. To provide cooling a retractable air-scoop is mounted above the rear fuselage. The forward fuselage is an all-metal monocoque structure with the rear section made from welded steel-tube with a glassfibre covering. The all-metal single spar wing and the tandem two-seat enclosed cockpit were taken from a Schweizer SGS 2-32 glider. It has a bicycle type landing gear with outriggers on the wing tips, the nosewheel is retractable by hand and the main wheel is semi-prone and fixed.

== Specifications ==
Data from Jane's All the World's Aircraft 1994-95

General characteristics

- Crew: 2
- Length: 24 ft 4 in (7.42 m)
- Wingspan: 57 ft 1 in (17.40 m)
- Wing area: 180 sq ft (16.70 m^{2})
- Aspect ratio: 18.05
- Empty weight: 1,388 lb (629 kg)
- Gross weight: 1,864 lb (845 kg)
- Powerplant: 1 × Barker-converted CE-2200 Volkswagen motor-car engine , 76 hp (57 kW)

Performance

- Maximum speed: 124 mph (200 km/h, 108 kn)
- Cruise speed: 100 mph (161 km/h, 87 kn)
- Stall speed: 50 mph (80.5 km/h, 43 kn)
- Range: 400 mi (644 km, 350 nmi)
- Endurance: 6 hours+
- Maximum glide ratio: 28.5:1
- Rate of climb: 180 ft/min (0.90 m/s)
- Rate of sink: 181 ft/min (0.92 m/s)

== See also ==
Related lists

- List of gliders
