= Schweizer SGS 2-32 =

American glider

SGS 2-32
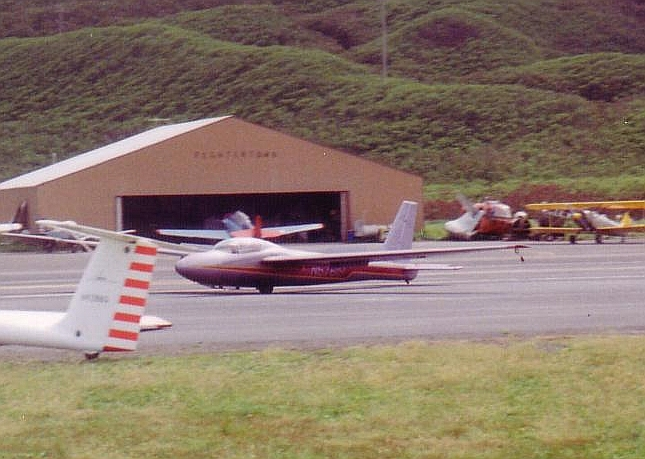

General information
- Type: Open-class sailplane
- National origin: United States
- Manufacturer: Schweizer Aircraft Corporation
- Designer: Ernest Schweizer
- Number built: 87

History
- First flight: 3 July 1962

External image
- Schweizer SGS 2-32

The Schweizer SGS 2-32 is an American two-seat, mid-wing, two or three-place glider built by Schweizer Aircraft of Elmira, New York.

The 2-32 was designed to be the highest performance two-place glider available, when it first flew in 1962. The 2-32 has been used as a tourist glider, trainer, cross-country and high-altitude sailplane and has set many US and world records. A total of 87 aircraft were completed.

== Design and development ==
The SGS 2-32 was conceived as a mass-produced sailplane of modest performance to act as a step-up from the SGU 2-22 trainer then in common use in North America. After careful examination of the potential market, the company decided to produce a higher performance sailplane with a greater wingspan instead.

The 2-32 design was started in 1961 and completed with certification under type certificate G1EA on 19 June 1964.

The 2-32 is all-metal, with a semi-monocoque aluminum fuselage and cantilever wings of 57 foot (17.37 m) span. It has top-and-bottom divebrakes and an all-flying stabilator tail.

The aircraft seats two or three, with one seat in the front cockpit and a double bench seat in the back suitable for two smaller people of 150 lb (68 kg) each, maximum. The aircraft is often described as a "2 1/2 seater".

The ability to carry two passengers, plus its complete and comfortable interior has made the 2-32 a popular aircraft with commercial glider operators for conducting tourist flights. The ability to carry two passengers doubled profitability for rides.

The first customer aircraft were delivered in 1964, shortly after certification was completed.

The type certificate is currently held by K & L Soaring of Cayuta, New York. K & L Soaring now provides all parts and support for the Schweizer line of sailplanes.

=== Derivative designs ===
The SGS 2-32 has been the basis of several derivative designs, including:

- Bede BD-2 long range experimental aircraft designed by Jim Bede
- Lockheed QT-2, QT-2PC, QT-2PCII, X-26B (see Schweizer X-26 Frigate)
- Lockheed YO-3 quiet surveillance aircraft
- LTV L450F prototype quiet reconnaissance aircraft
- LTV XQM-93 turboprop a remotely piloted aircraft
- Ryson STP-1 Swallow motor glider
- Schweizer X-26 Frigate United States Navy yaw/roll coupling trainer

== Operational history ==
As soon as it entered service many pilots realized that this high performance two-place sailplane would be ideal to break many of the two-place records previously set by lower performance gliders.

At one time the 2-32 held the two-place speed records over 100 km, 300 km and 500 km courses, as well as many distance, out and return and altitude records in both the men's and women's categories. 2-32s were also flown in the 1964 US Nationals.

Some of the records set by pilots flying SGS 2-32s include:

- World record two-place out and return flight, 404 miles (654 km), May 23, 1970, Joe Lincoln and Cris Crowl. Lincoln's 2-32, named Cibola, had special longer wings of 67-foot (20 m) span installed that increased performance further.
- World record two-place speed over 100 km (63 miles) Triangle, 74 mph (120 km/h), 1971, Joe Lincoln.
- World record two-place feminine absolute altitude 35,463 feet (10,809 m) and altitude gain 24,545 feet (7848 m), 5 March 1975, Babs Nutt.

In May 2014 there were still 58 2-32s registered in the USA and one in Canada.

In USAF service at the United States Air Force Academy the 2-32 was known as the TG-5.

== Aircraft on display ==
The National Soaring Museum has two SGS 2-32s in its collection, N2767Z and N8600R, the prototype. N8600R is currently on loan to and on display at the Evergreen Aviation & Space Museum in McMinnville, Oregon.

== Specifications (2-32) ==
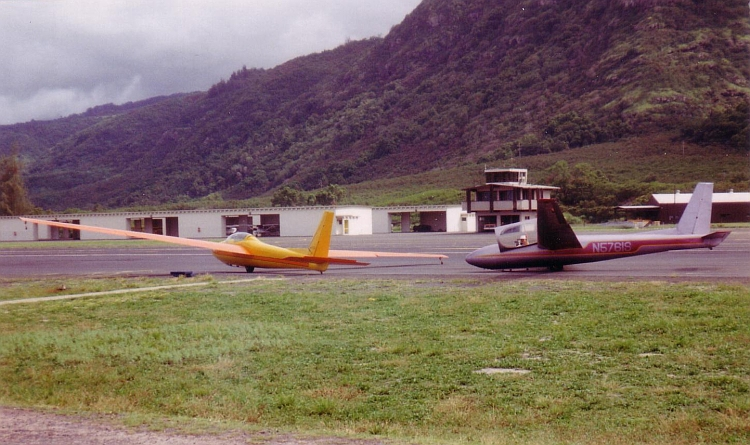
Two SGS 2-32s used for tourist flights, Dillingham Airfield Oahu, 1993

Data from The World's Sailplanes:Die Segelflugzeuge der Welt:Les Planeurs du Monde Volume II and Colorado Soaring Association

General characteristics

- Crew: one
- Capacity: two passengers
- Length: 26 ft 9 in (8.15 m)
- Wingspan: 57 ft 0 in (17.37 m)
- Height: 4 ft 0 in (1.22 m) at cockpit
- Wing area: 180 sq ft (16.7 m^{2})
- Aspect ratio: 18.05
- Airfoil: Root – NACA 63_{3}618, Mid – NACA 63_{3}618, Tip NACA 43 012A
- Empty weight: 831 lb (377 kg) equipped
- Gross weight: 1,430 lb (648 kg) Above 608 kg (1340 lb) only utility class

Performance

- Stall speed: 46 mph (74 km/h, 40 kn)
- Never exceed speed: 157 mph (252 km/h, 136 kn)
- g limits: +5.8 -3.8 at 164.0 mph; 142.5 kn (264 km/h)
- Maximum glide ratio: 35 at 55.9 mph; 48.6 kn (90 km/h)
- Rate of sink: 124 ft/min (0.63 m/s) at 46.0 mph; 40.0 kn (74 km/h)
- Wing loading: 6.0 lb/sq ft (29.3 kg/m^{2})

== See also ==
Related lists

- List of gliders
