= Schweizer SGS 1-34 =

Glider built by Schweizer Aircraft

SGS 1-34
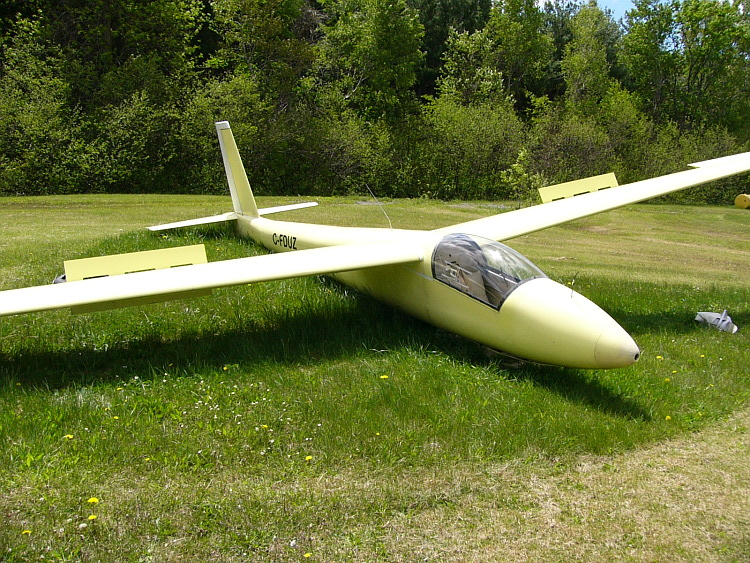
- SGS 1-34 with air brakes deployed

General information
- Type: Standard-class sailplane
- National origin: United States
- Manufacturer: Schweizer Aircraft Corporation
- Designer: Ernest Schweizer
- Number built: 93

History
- First flight: 1969
- Variant: Martin Marietta Model 845

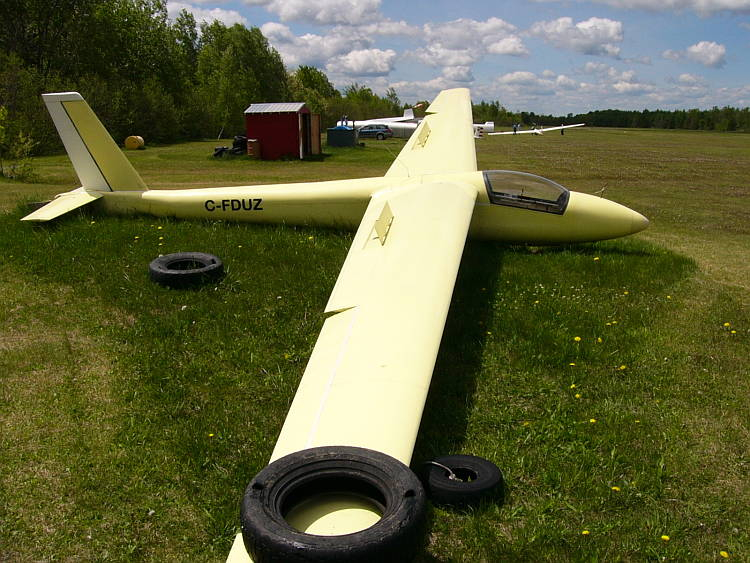
Schweizer SGS 1-34 showing wing planform. The tire is used to secure the wing in windy conditions

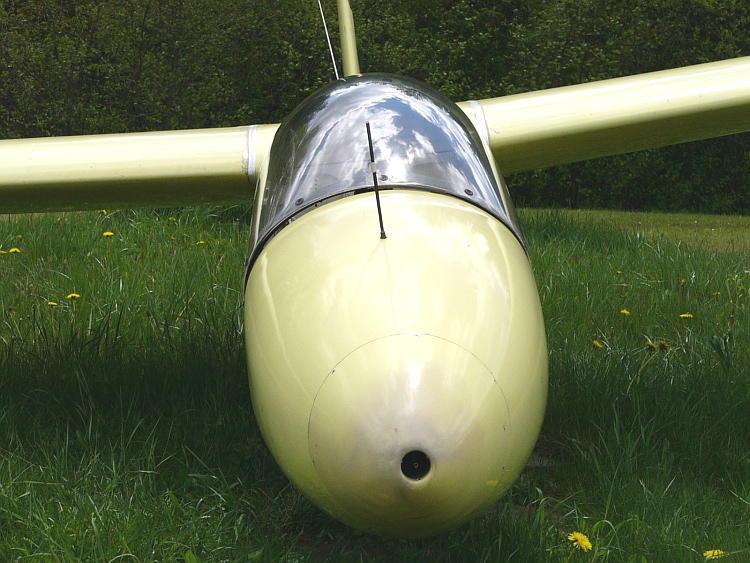
Schweizer SGS 1-34, front view showing air vent intake with pitot tube mounted inside

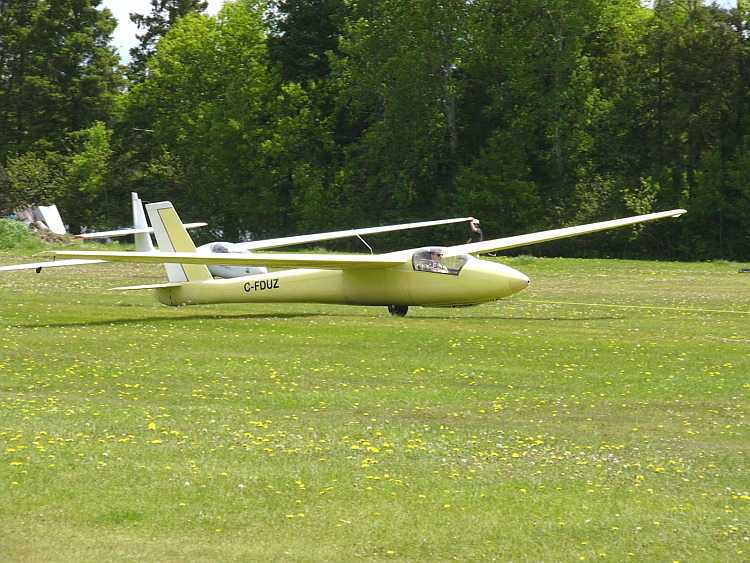
Schweizer SGS 1-34 on take-off

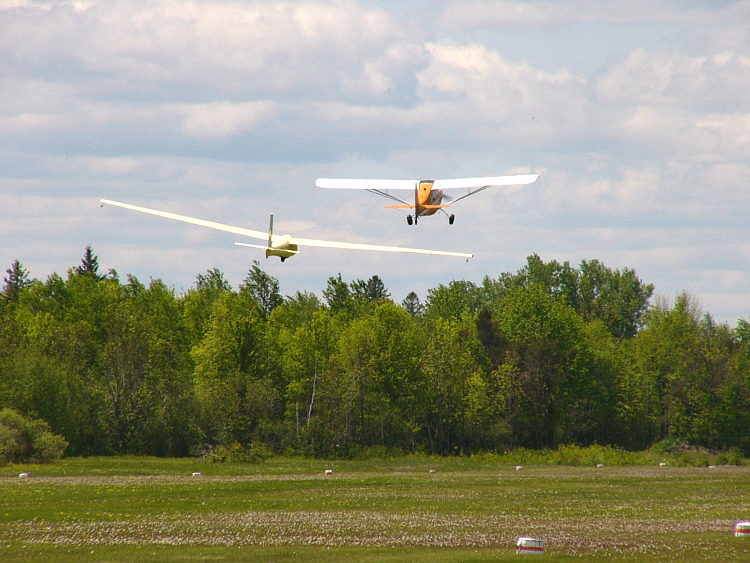
Schweizer SGS 1-34 being towed by a Champion 7GCAA Citabria

The Schweizer SGS 1-34 is a United States Standard Class, single-seat, high-wing glider built by Schweizer Aircraft of Elmira, New York.

The 1-34 was designed over a number of years in the mid-1960s and first flew in 1969.

By the time the 1-34 was introduced it was no longer competitive in the Standard Class, but has proven very successful as a club aircraft.

== Design and development ==
The 1-34 was designed over several years to spread out the development costs. At the time the design work on the aircraft was started the Standard Class was new and described a very simple aircraft with terminal velocity dive brakes, fixed landing gear and no water ballast. By the time the 1-34 had flown in 1969 the Standard Class rules had changed to allow essentially unrestricted sailplanes with a 15-metre (49.2 feet) wingspan.

The SGS 1-34 is of all metal aluminum semi-monocoque construction. All surfaces are aluminum covered, with the exception of the rudder which is covered in aircraft fabric.

The 1-34 has air brakes capable of limiting the terminal velocity in a vertical dive to the maximum safe speed as specified in the original Standard Class rules. Developing and testing these proved expensive and time-consuming and this also extended the aircraft's development time.

The 1-34 was the first Schweizer design to depart from using a NACA airfoil. The 1-34 has no wing washout and instead uses a Wortmann FX 61-163 airfoil at the wing root, transitioning to a Wortmann FX 61-126 airfoil at the wing tip. The tip airfoil stalls at a higher angle of attack, ensuring that the wing root stalls first.

The one company concession to the changing Standard Class rules was the development of a retractable landing gear version of the 1-34, designated as the SGS 1-34R.

The 1-34 also features in-flight adjustable rudder pedals and a two-way adjustable seat to accommodate pilots of different heights.

The 1-34 was flown in Standard Class competitions, but was out-performed by the new fiberglass European gliders, such as the Glasflügel H-201 Standard Libelle.

During the protracted development process, Schweizer Aircraft was aware that the 1-34 would be overtaken by the changes in class rules and also by the performance of the newer European fiberglass sailplanes, but continued development of the SGS 1-34 anyway. The company identified that there was demand from private owners and especially clubs and commercial operations for a simple, rugged single seat glider with greater performance than the 1-26.

In service the 1-34 has proven to be a popular club aircraft and ideal for the completion of badge flights. If a greater number of 1-34s had been built, Schweizer indicated that it would have become another one-design class, similar to the 1-26.

The 1-34 type certificate is currently held by K & L Soaring of Cayuta, New York. K & L Soaring now provides all parts and support for the Schweizer line of sailplanes.

== Operational history ==
At least two 1-34s have been highly modified. Bob Park's 1-34R, registered N17974, was damaged when a hurricane passed through Georgia and resulted in a hangar collapse. The 1-34R was rebuilt with a V-tail and ballast tanks mounted in the wings that hold 230 lbs (105 kg) of water. The aircraft was subsequently registered in the experimental Racing – Exhibition category.

A modified SGS 1-34 airframe with tricycle landing gear and powered by a Lycoming TIO-360 piston engine was used as the basis for the pilotless Martin Marietta Model 845 prototype, an entry in the early 1970s USAF Compass Dwell endurance UAV program.

In May 2008 there were still 63 1-34s and six 1-34Rs registered in the USA and 5 SGS 1-34s in Canada.

The USAF designation for the SGS 1-34 is TG-6.

== Variants ==
1-34
The original fixed landing gear 1-34 model was certified under type certificate G3EA on 16 October 1969.
1-34R
The retractable gear 1-34R was added to type certificate G3EA on 15 June 1971.
Park 1-34R Modified
After a hangar collapsed on Bob Park's 1-34R and destroyed the aft part of the aircraft he rebuilt it in the Experimental – Racing/Exhibition category with a V-tail and 230 lb (104 kg) of water ballast. The new tail allowed 18 lb (8 kg) of lead nose ballast to be removed. The aircraft flew three diamond goal and gold distance flights in August 1983.

== Aircraft on display ==
- US Southwest Soaring Museum

== Specifications ==
General characteristics

- Crew: One
- Length: 25 ft 5 in (7.80 m)
- Wingspan: 49 ft 3 in (15.00 m)
- Height: 7 ft 6 in (2.31 m)
- Wing area: 151 sq ft (14.0 m^{2})
- Aspect ratio: 16
- Airfoil: Root: Wortmann FX 61-163, Tip: Wortmann FX 61-126
- Empty weight: 570 lb (259 kg)
- Gross weight: 840 lb (381 kg)

Performance

- Maximum speed: 142 mph (227 km/h, 123 kn)
- Maximum glide ratio: 33 at 55 mph (88 km/h)
- Rate of sink: 144 ft/min (0.73 m/s)

== See also ==
Aircraft of comparable role, configuration, and era

- N.V. Vliegtuigbouw 013 Sagitta
- Pilatus B-4
- ICA IS-29

Related lists

- List of gliders
