= Frontiers of Flight Museum =

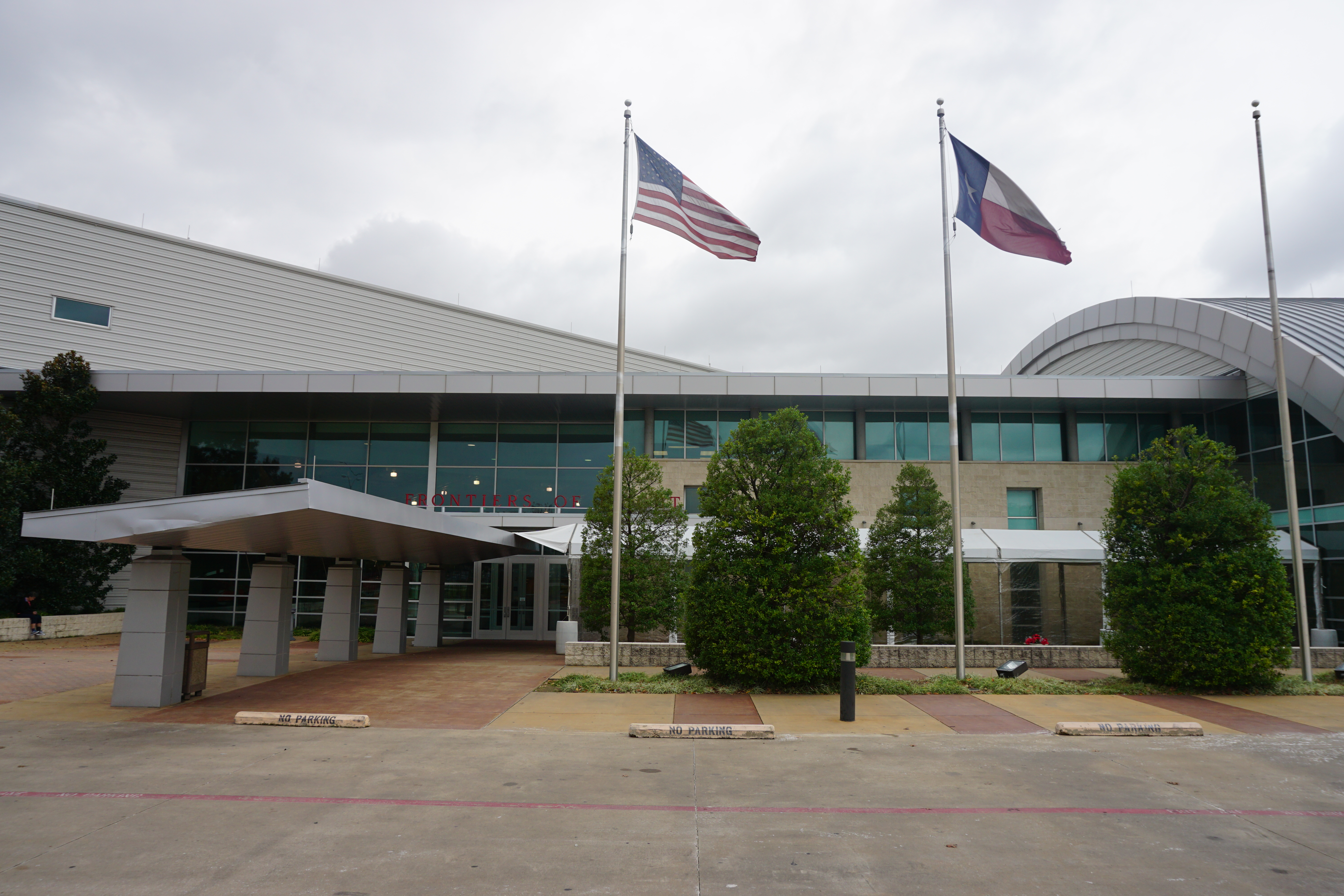
- Front entrance

- Location within Texas
- Established: 1988
- Location: Dallas, Texas
- Coordinates: 32.8424°N 96.8353°W
- Type: Aviation museum
- Founders: Jan Collmer, William E. “Bill” Cooper, Kay Bailey Hutchison
- Website: www.flightmuseum.com

The Frontiers of Flight Museum is an aerospace museum located in Dallas, Texas, founded in November 1988 by William E. Cooper, Kay Bailey Hutchison, and Jan Collmer. Originally located within a terminal at Dallas Love Field, the museum now occupies a 100,000-square-foot (9,300 m^{2}) building at the southeast corner of Love Field on Lemmon Avenue. The museum is an affiliate within the Smithsonian Affiliations program.

Aviation historian George E. Haddaway promoted the founding of the museum subsequent to donation of his extensive personal collection of aviation history books, journals, photographs, as well as archives to the University of Texas at Dallas as the nucleus of the History of Aviation Collection.

The museum features an extensive collection of aviation history artifacts and vehicles, and focuses on the history of aviation and space exploration with an emphasis on the role of the Dallas/Fort Worth area. Exhibits include the Apollo 7 Command Module; a Moon rock, billed as the only one on display in North Texas; a World War I Sopwith Pup biplane replica; artifacts from the German airship Hindenburg and other airships; and over 200 World War II aircraft models.

== Aircraft on display ==
- Bell TH-1L Iroquois
- Bell TH-13S Sioux
- Bell UH-1D Iroquois
- Boeing 737-200 nose section, Southwest Airlines livery.
- Boeing 737-300 registration N300SW, Southwest Airlines livery.
- Boeing-Stearman PT-17 Kaydet
- Bücker Bü 133 – replica
- Culver Dart GC
- Curtiss JN-4D
- de Havilland DH.82H Tiger Moth
- E-Systems XQM-93A
- Glasflügel BS-1
- Grumman EA-6B Prowler
- Laser 200
- LearAvia Lear Fan 2100
- Learjet 24D
- Lockheed T-33A
- Lockheed Martin F-16B Fighting Falcon
- LTV A-7 Corsair II
- McDonnell Douglas F/A-18C Hornet 163435 – former Blue Angels aircraft
- Meyer's Little Toot
- Northrop T-38 Talon
- Piper PA-20 Pacer
- Pitts S-2B
- Republic F-105D Thunderchief
- Ryan PT-22 Recruit
- Shoestring F1 Racer
- SpaceShipOne – exact replica, on long-term loan
- Sopwith Pup – replica
- Texas-Temple Sportsman – sole surviving example
- Thorp T-18
- Raytheon BGM-109 Tomahawk cruise missile
- Vought RF-8G Crusader
- Vought V-173
- Wright Flyer – model

== Gallery ==
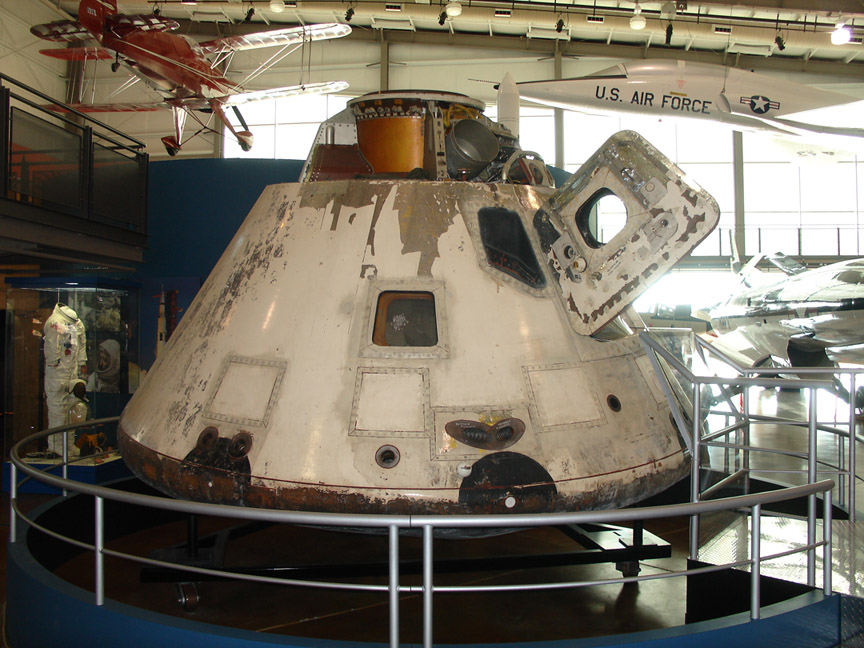
Apollo 7 Command Module

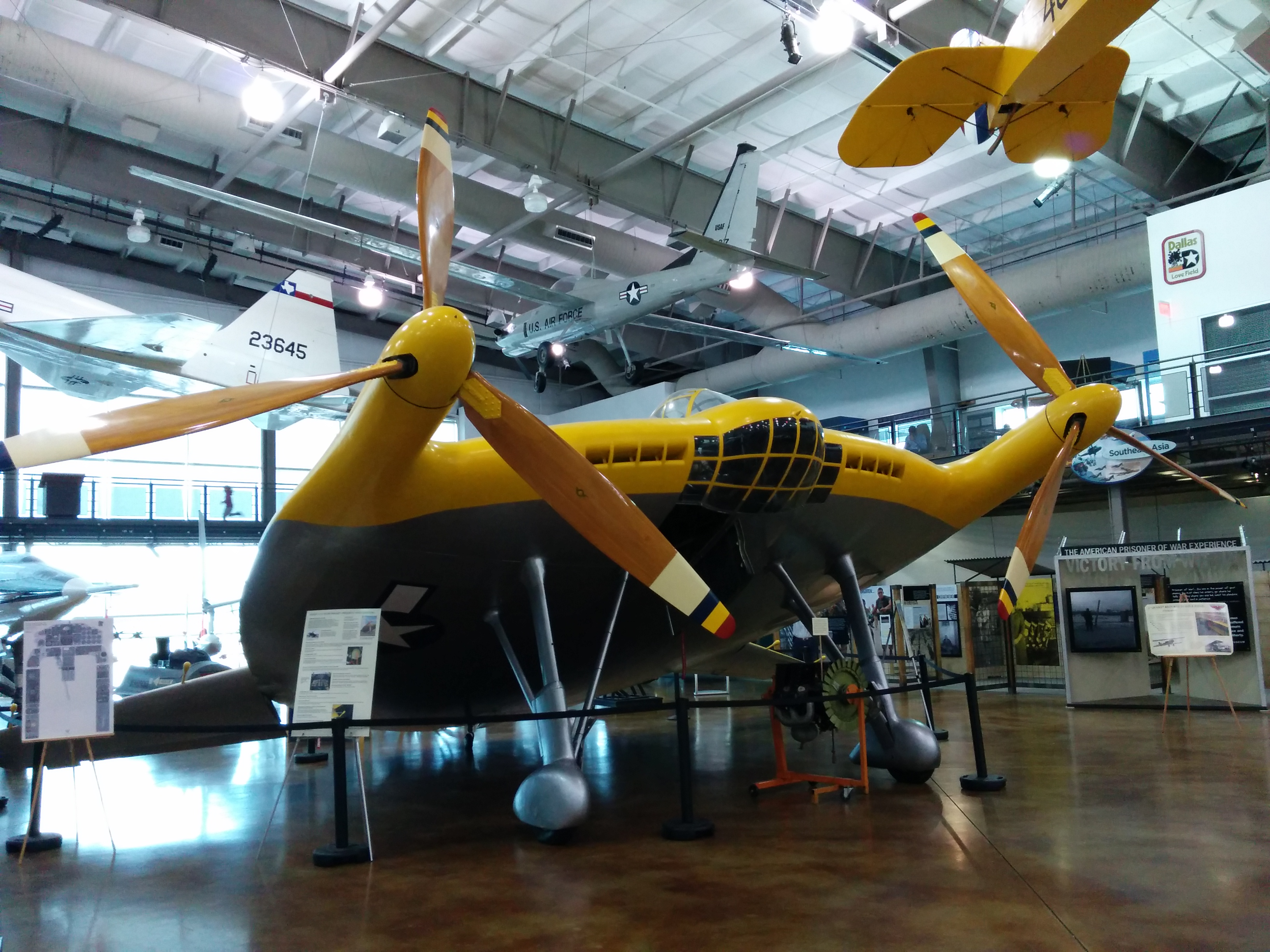
Vought V-173

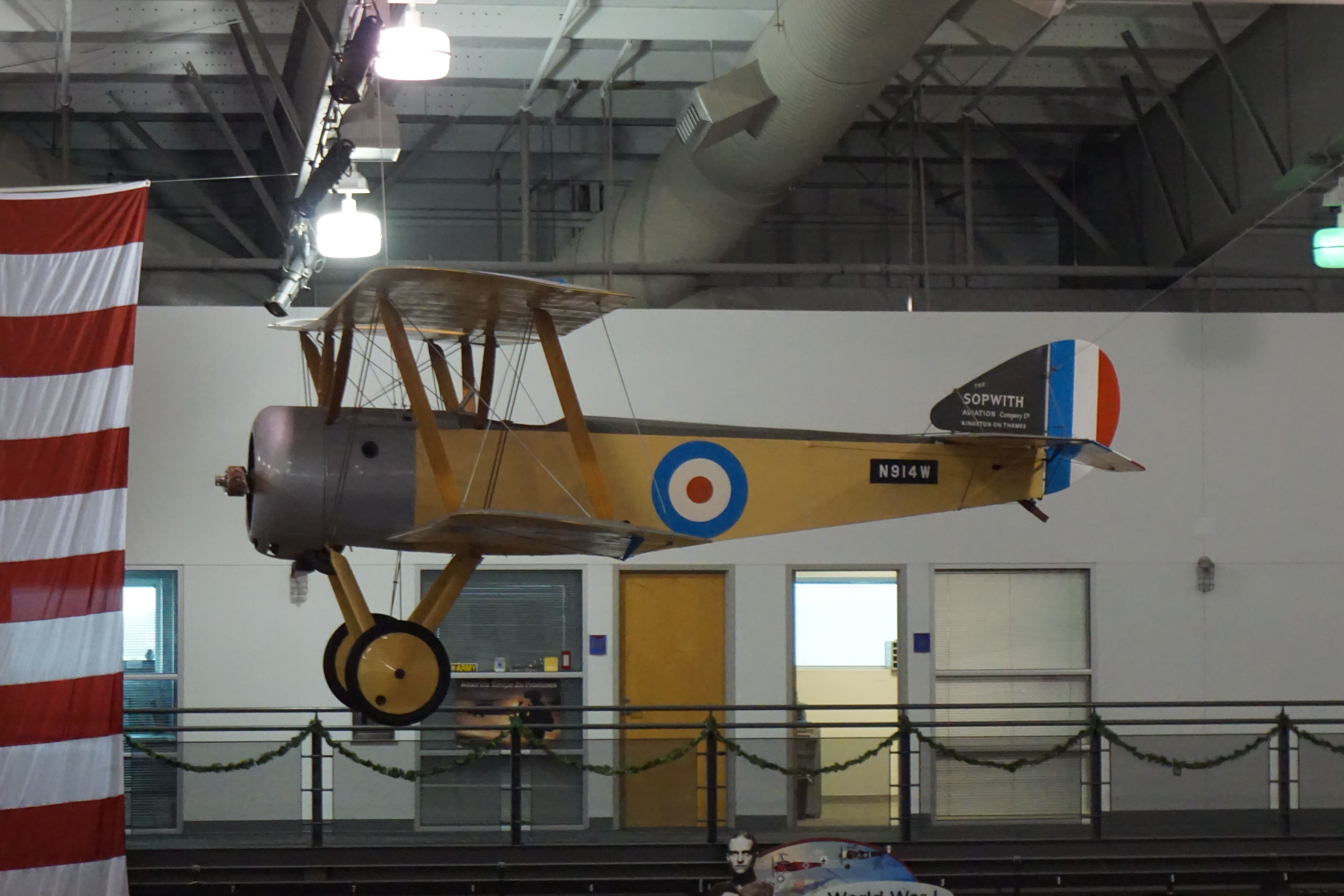
Sopwith Pup replica

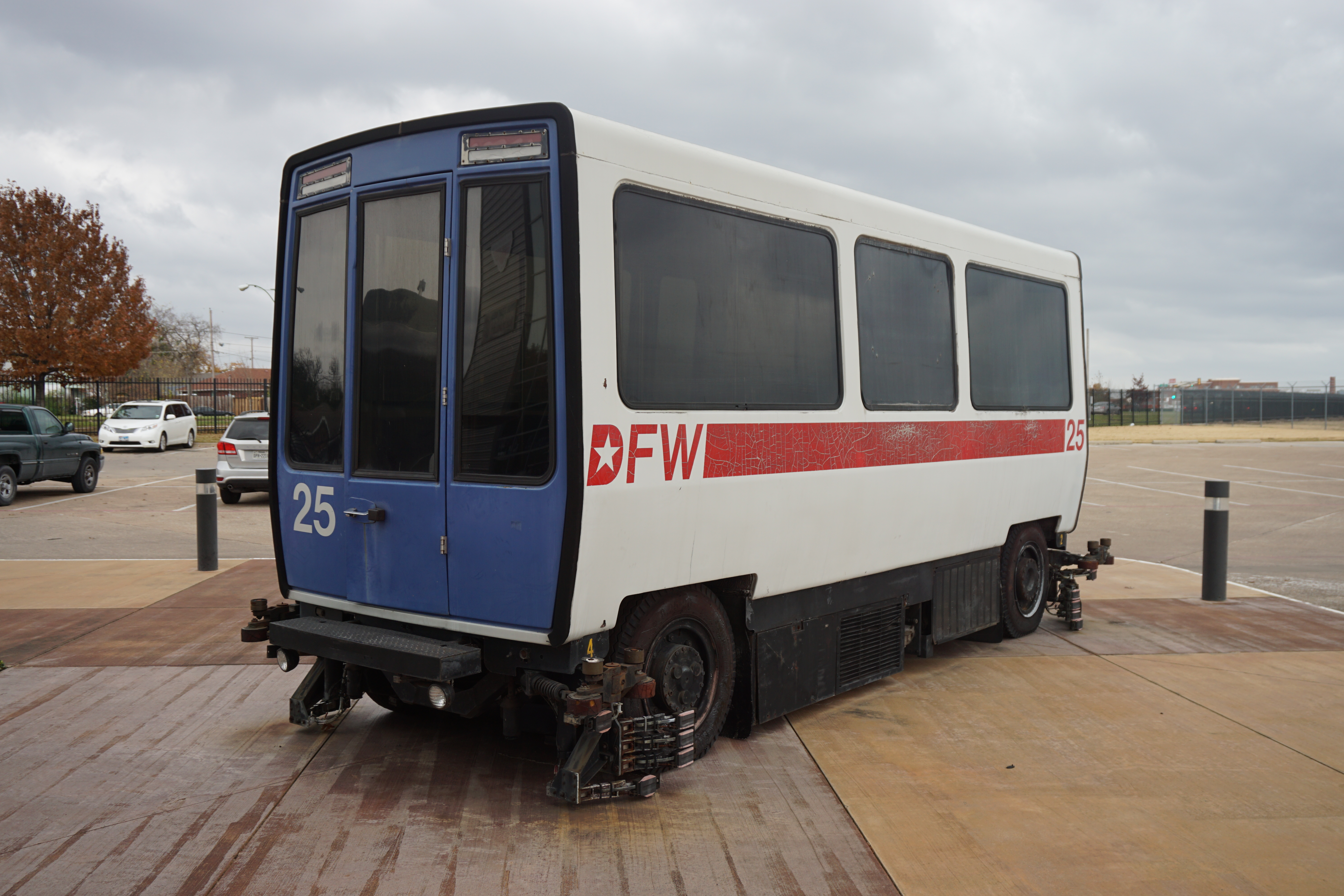
Vought Airtrans (Car #25)

== See also ==
- List of aerospace museums
