= Compass Cope =

Compass Cope was a program initiated by the United States Air Force to develop an upgraded reconnaissance Unmanned aerial vehicle. The two aircraft that participated in the program were:

- Boeing YQM-94 B-Gull – Compass Cope B
- Ryan YQM-98 R-Tern – Compass Cope R
