= Lockheed YO-3 Quiet Star =

American observer plane

YO-3A "Quiet Star"
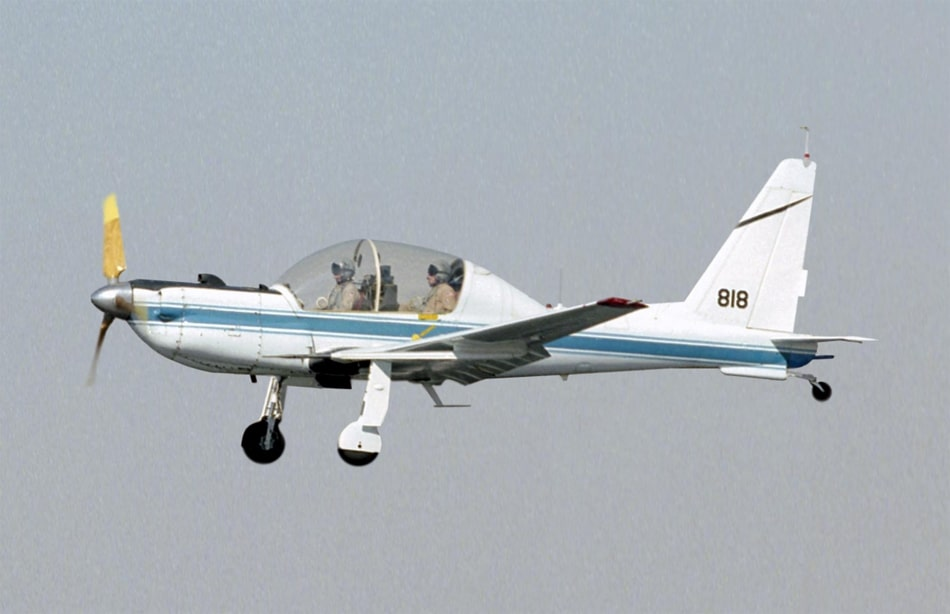
- NASA's YO-3A departing Armstrong Flight Research Center

General information
- Type: Night reconnaissance
- National origin: United States
- Manufacturer: Lockheed Missiles and Space Company
- Primary user: United States Army
- Number built: 11

History
- Manufactured: 1969–1970
- Introduction date: 1969
- First flight: 1969
- Retired: 1971
- Developed from: Schweizer SGS 2-32

The Lockheed YO-3A "Quiet Star" is an American single-engined, propeller-driven aircraft that was developed for battlefield observation during the Vietnam War. Designed to be as quiet as possible, it was intended to observe troop movements in near-silence during the hours of darkness.

== Design and development ==
The YO-3A was designed to a United States Army specification of 1968, which called for an observation aircraft that would be acoustically undetectable from the ground when flying at an altitude of 1,500 feet (457 m) at night.

Lockheed Missiles and Space Company located in Sunnyvale, California was contracted to produce two prototype aircraft. In 1966, the company built two QT-2 "Quiet Thrusters", using modified Schweizer SGS 2-32 gliders. The prototype QT-2s were then modified to the QT-2PC "Prize Crew" configuration. The QT-2PC had a silenced engine and a slow-turning propeller for quiet operation.

Following operational trials with the QT-2PC in Vietnam, a production aircraft, designated the YO-3A was ordered. This aircraft's design was also based on the Schweizer SGS 2-32 glider. Like the QT-2PC, the YO-3A has a large wingspan and a larger canopy area for observation. Two crew members (a pilot and an observer) are seated in tandem. The observer is located at the front of the cockpit. The YO-3A is an all-metal low-wing monoplane of semi-monocoque construction. The control surfaces of the YO-3A including the ailerons and rudder are fabric-covered. The engine cover, canopy, engine exhaust shroud, wing-root fairings, and wheel-well fairings were constructed of fiberglass. The YO-3A has retractable tailwheel-type landing gear.

The YO-3A was powered by an air-cooled, six-cylinder, horizontally opposed, fuel-injected, Continental Model No. IO-360D engine. The engine is coupled to a slow-turning propeller through a belt pulley-drive system. The propeller reduction ratio is 3.33:1. Originally equipped with a six-bladed ground-adjustable-pitch propeller, this was replaced in March 1971 with a three-bladed laminated constant-speed wooden propeller designed by Ole Fahlin. The engine cowling and firewall were lined with fiberglass material to dampen and contain engine noise.

The YO-3A is equipped with an Asymmetrical Exhaust System. A crossover exhaust pipe is used to remove exhaust from the left bank of engine cylinders to the right side of the engine compartment. This crossover joins the right bank exhaust pipe and exits along the lower right side of the engine compartment. The exhaust gases are then moved through an acoustical fairing into a dissipating and resonating muffler continuing to the aft end of the fuselage.

Nine of the eleven YO-3As produced operated in South Vietnam, at night, from 1970 to 1971 (Late June 1970 to September 1971) and, although three were destroyed in crashes, none were damaged by enemy fire or shot down. The YO-3A was very successful in spotting movement by the Viet Cong and North Vietnam Army (NVA) operating in South Vietnam.

== Operational history ==
=== Vietnam War ===
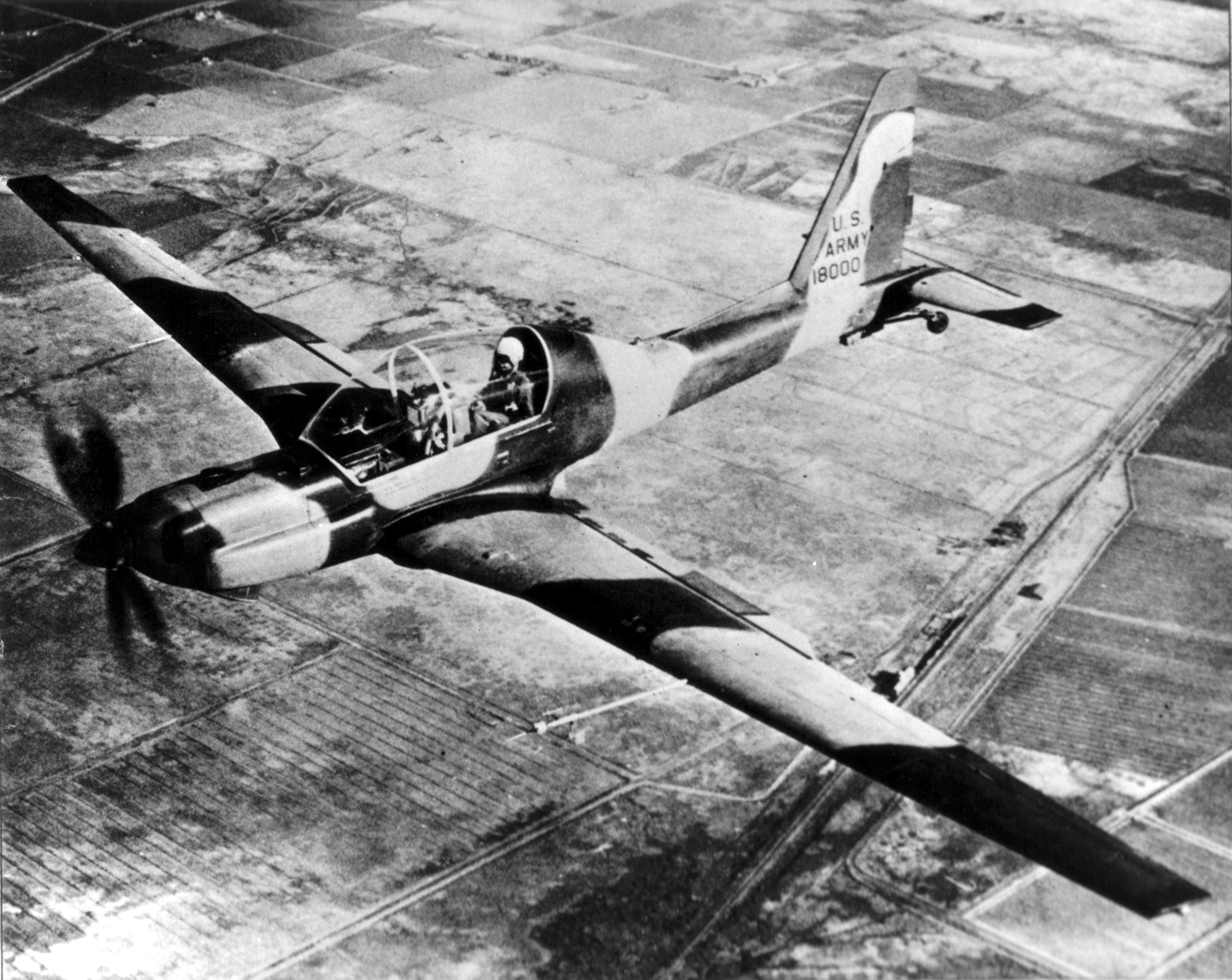
The YO-3 saw limited service in Vietnam.

Following combat evaluation of the QT-2s in Vietnam by the Army, nine production YO-3As were sent to Long Thanh North, Vietnam, in 1970. Shortly after, three were sent to the 220th Aviation Company, Phu Bai and two to Binh Thuy Air Base. Observations were initially made visually (80%), later followed on with a Night Vision Aerial Periscope developed by Xerox Electro-Optical of Pasadena, California. The mission equipment on the YO-3A was a Night Vision Aerial Periscope with infrared illuminator. One YO-3A was equipped with a laser target designator. The laser designator system was never used.

The YO-3A operated silently at 1,000 feet (300 m), or lower, depending on terrestrial background noise. Some pilots were known to have gone unobserved over the enemy at 200 feet (61 m). Occasionally, daylight flights were made over the rivers. Crew chiefs would monitor the YO-3A flying over the maintenance section prior to deployment, listening for rattles, whistles or other noises. The propeller, even at 500 feet (150 m) over the maintenance area, made only a light flutter, heard just as it approached. This was followed by a light rushing of wind over the wings. There was no audible sound once the aircraft had passed over. If any abnormal noises were heard, the aircraft returned to the runway, where duct tape and other measures were employed to quiet noticeable sounds.

=== Postwar usage ===
After Vietnam, two YO-3As, 69-18006 and 69–18007, were used by the Louisiana Department of Fish and Game. The aircraft was effective at catching poachers. The FBI eventually acquired the aircraft, and operated the type for several years, assisting the apprehension of kidnappers and extortionists.

NASA took possession of one YO-3A, 69–18010. Following service with the U.S. Army this aircraft was transferred to an airframe and powerplant mechanics school. NASA's Ames Research Center located at Moffett Federal Airfield in California acquired the YO-3A from the school in 1977. NASA equipped the aircraft with wing-tip and tail-mounted microphones. These microphones were used to record the in-flight acoustic signatures of a variety of U.S. Army helicopters and Tiltrotor aircraft. The YO-3 was also used to measure sonic booms from the Lockheed SR-71 Blackbird. In 1997, the NASA YO-3A was transferred to the Dryden Flight Research Center (now Armstrong Flight Research Center) at Edwards Air Force Base, in California. The YO-3A remained in a flyable storage state until October 2004. Then the YO-3A was flown back to Ames to support rotorcraft research again for nearly two years before once again returning to Dryden. In 2015, the aircraft was retired by NASA and sold by the General Services Administration at auction to the Vietnam Helicopters Museum.

== Variants ==
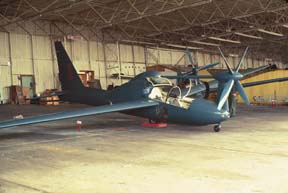
QT-2PC in 1968

QT-1 Quiet Thruster
Proposed single-seat powered glider based on the Schweizer SGS 2-32, not built.
QT-2
Two modified Schweizer X-26 two-seat sailplanes for evaluation, later modified with sensor packages as the QT-2PC.
QT-2PC Prize Crew
Two QT-2s with combat sensor packages for evaluation in Vietnam theatre, one reduced to spares and the other returned to the United States Navy as the Schweizer X-26B.
Q-Star
Modified Schweizer SGS 2-32 for engine/propeller development.
YO-3A
Production aircraft for the United States Army, 11 built

== Operators ==
=== Military operators ===
United States

- United States Army

=== Civil operators ===
United States

- FBI
- Louisiana Department of Fish and Game
- NASA

== Surviving aircraft ==
- 69-18000 – YO-3A in storage at the United States Army Aviation Museum in Fort Novosel, Alabama.
- 69-18001 – YO-3A on static display at the Hiller Aviation Museum in San Carlos, California.
- 69-18003 – YO-3A in storage, Miami, Florida. Privately owned by Richard Osborne.
- 69-18005 – YO-3A on static display at the Museum of Flight in Seattle, Washington.
- 69-18006 – YO-3A on static display at the Pima Air & Space Museum in Tucson, Arizona.
- 69-18007 – YO-3A in storage at the Western Museum of Flight in Torrance, California.
- 69-18010 – YO-3A in storage at the Vietnam Helicopters Museum in Concord, California.

== Specifications ==
General characteristics

- Crew: 2
- Length: 29 ft 4 in (8.94 m)
- Wingspan: 57 ft (17 m)
- Wing area: 213.1 sq ft (19.80 m^{2})
- Aspect ratio: 15.24
- Max takeoff weight: 3,800 lb (1,724 kg)
- Powerplant: 1 × Continental Model No. I0-360D engine , 210 hp (156 kW) at 2800 rpm
- Propellers: 3-bladed laminated wood, constant-speed propeller.

Performance

- Maximum speed: 103 mph (166 km/h, 90 kn)
- Cruise speed: 80.6 mph (129.7 km/h, 70.0 kn)
- Stall speed: 64.4 mph (103.6 km/h, 56.0 kn)
- Maximum glide ratio: 7:1 at 80kts IAS

== See also ==
Related development

- Schweizer SGS 2-32
- Schweizer X-26 Frigate
