= Beechcraft QU-22 Pave Eagle =

American airborne radio relay aircraft

QU-22 Pave Eagle
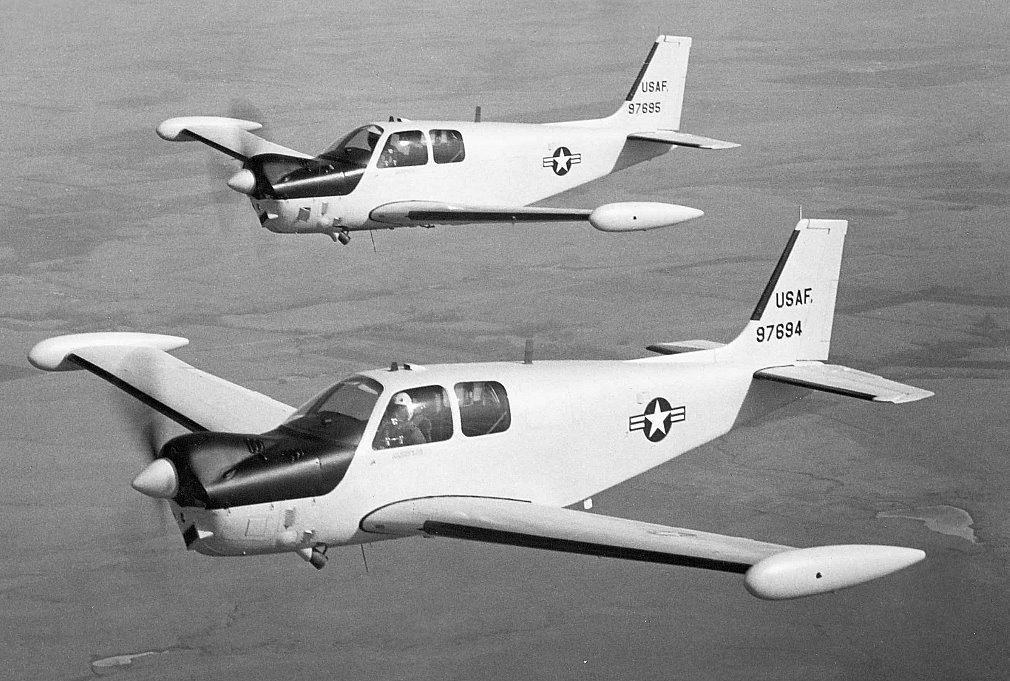
- Two QU-22B Pave Eagle IIs in flight

General information
- Type: Airborne radio relay
- National origin: United States
- Manufacturer: Beechcraft
- Status: Retired
- Primary user: United States Air Force
- Number built: 34 (including 6 converted from existing Bonanzas)

History
- Introduction date: 1968
- Retired: 1972
- Developed from: Beechcraft Bonanza

The Beechcraft QU-22 Pave Eagle is an American optionally-piloted airborne radio relay aircraft based on the Beechcraft Bonanza. Designed to replace the Lockheed EC-121R Batcat, the QU-22 served with the United States Air Force in the Vietnam War for a short period between 1968 and 1972.

== Design and development ==
The YQU-22A Pave Eagle I was conceived during the Vietnam War as a replacement for the Lockheed EC-121R Batcat in the Operation Igloo White mission. The Batcat, which was based on the Lockheed L-1049 Super Constellation airliner, proved to be expensive and required a crew of 15 people, prompting the United States Air Force to order a new aircraft based on the Beechcraft Bonanza. The Pave Eagle I was a modified Model E33A Bonanza and was capable of unmanned flight. The YQU-22A was powered by a Continental TSIO-520-D engine and was fitted with tip tanks.

The YQU-22A proved to be inadequate, so Beechcraft built an improved version in secret as the QU-22B Pave Eagle II, which was based on the Model A36 Bonanza. The Pave Eagle II is powered by a 375 hp (280 kW) Continental GTSIO-520-G engine; a model Teledyne Continental Motors has no record of. The aircraft is fitted with a propeller that combines the blades of a Mitsubishi MU-2 with a custom hub, which is driven by a reduction gearbox to reduce the propeller's revolutions per minute to reduce noise. The engine is also fitted with a turbocharger made by AiResearch, which the company claimed belonged to a semi truck. The QU-22B also had deicing boots, a sensor array, and equipment for remote control; all of which were powered by a large generator atop the engine. Though based on the Bonanza, the QU-22B uses the wing spar and landing gear of the Beechcraft Baron. The QU-22B's pilot's operating handbook specifies a maximum gross weight of 5,800 lb (2,600 kg); considerably higher than the later Mode G36 Bonanza's maximum takeoff weight of 3,650 lb (1,660 kg). When fitted with tip tanks, the QU-22B could carry 220 US gal (830 L) of fuel, compared to the 74 US gal (280 L) of the G36 Bonanza. The QU-22B had explosive bolts in the wings, allowing the aircraft to self-destruct if the operator lost control during unmanned flight.

Beechcraft also developed a low-cost close air support variant in 1970 as the YAU-22A using the fuselage of a Model A36 Bonanza, the wings of a Model 95-B55 Baron, and a 350 hp (260 kW) Continental GTSIO-520 engine. The YAU-22A was designed for the United States Air Force Pave COIN program, in which it competed against the Fairchild AU-23A Peacemaker, Helio AU-24 Stallion, and Piper PA-48 Enforcer. Although the Air Force initially chose the YAU-22A over the competing designs, flight testing revealed the aircraft to be underpowered and unsafe to fly with weapons. Only a single prototype was built before the YAU-22A program was canceled in 1972.

== Operational history ==
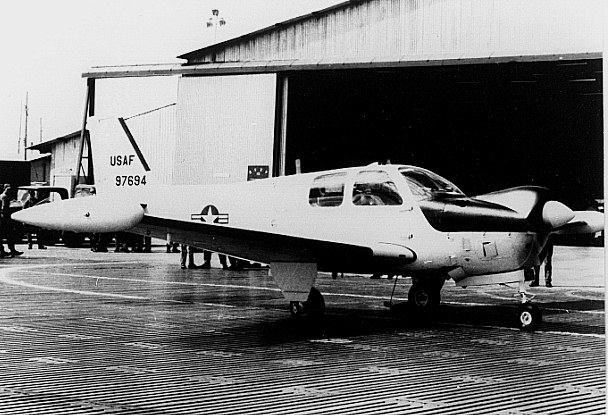
A QU-22B warming up its engine at Nakhon Phanom Royal Thai Navy Base.

The YQU-22A was evaluated by the 553rd Reconnaissance Wing from Nakhon Phanom Airport between December 1968 and August 1969. Two aircraft were lost in combat.

The 553rd Reconnaissance Wing performed a combat evaluation of the QU-22B between July and September 1970 before the aircraft was made fully operational with the wing in October. However, the wing was inactivated shortly thereafter in December 1970. The QU-22B was subsequently used by the 554th Reconnaissance Squadron. A typical QU-22B Igloo White mission involved of the aircraft orbiting near the Ho Chi Minh trail and relaying signals from ground sensors to the Information Surveillance Center at Nakhon Phanom Royal Thai Navy Base. Though the aircraft was designed to operate as an optionally piloted vehicle, the QU-22B was almost always flown with a pilot due to the impracticality of unmanned missions. Pilots disliked the aircraft's large cowling hump, which made climbing difficult as it induced vertigo and blocked the pilot's view. Pilots regularly flew with a total weight of 6,400 lb (2,900 kg), well exceeding the maximum gross weight of 5,800 lb (2,600 kg) specified in the pilot's operating handbook.

The QU-22B also flew missions under the code name "Compass Flag", where the aircraft would fly down the middle of Laos and listen to the North Vietnamese Army's General Directorate of Rear Services. For Compass Flag missions, the aircraft would fly with a "big black box", which was handcuffed to the pilot's wrist, in place of the typical radio equipment. Of the 27 QU-22Bs built, a total of six were lost in Vietnam, claiming the lives of two pilots. None of these crashes were due to ground fire. As a result of these crashes, the QU-22 program was canceled in 1972. The QU-22B was replaced by the Lockheed EC-130 for the Compass Flag mission.

In a now-declassified 1971 report from the RAND Corporation, the think tank outlined a plan for a border security program to be implemented by South Vietnam. Among the recommended equipment to be used by this program were 24 YQU-22A aircraft.

== Variants ==
YQU-22A Pave Eagle I
Company designation Model 1074. Prototypes based on the Model E33A Bonanza with a Continental TSIO-520-D engine, tip tanks, and capable of unmanned flight. Six aircraft were modified from existing E33As and assigned new construction numbers.
YAU-22A
Company designation Model PD.249. Prototype low-cost close-support version combining the fuselage of a Model A36 Bonanza with the wings of a Model 95-B55 Baron. The YAU-22A was powered by a 350 hp (260 kW) Continental GTSIO-520 engine. One built.
QU-22B Pave Eagle II
Company designation Model 1079. Production model based on the Model A36 Bonanza but with a geared 375 hp (280 kW) Continental GTSIO-520-G engine driving a custom propeller, the wing spar and landing gear of the Beechcraft Baron, deicing boots, a generator above the engine to power the electronics, and explosive wing bolts. 27 built, all new production.

== Surviving aircraft ==
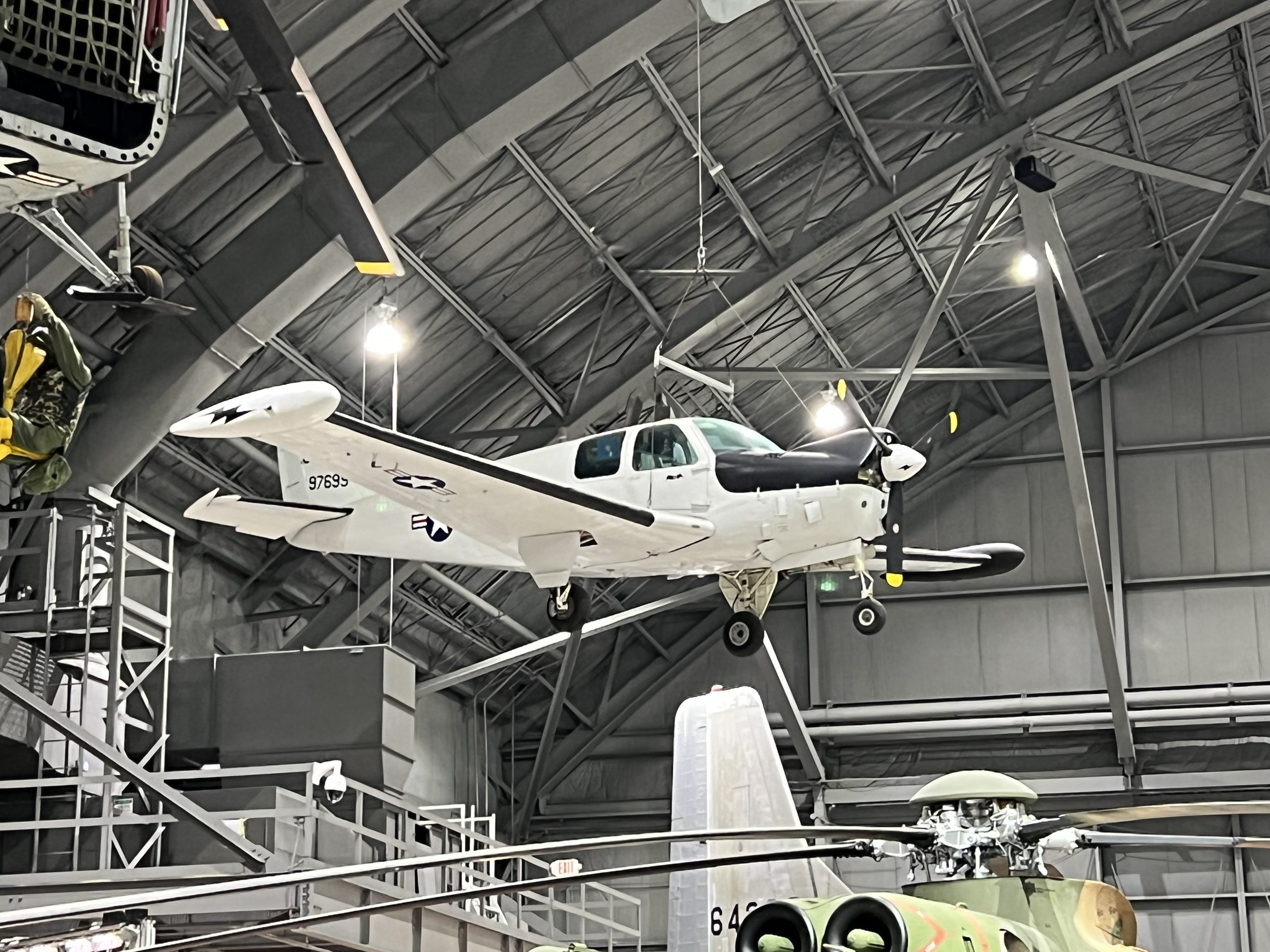
69-7699 on display at the National Museum of the United States Air Force.

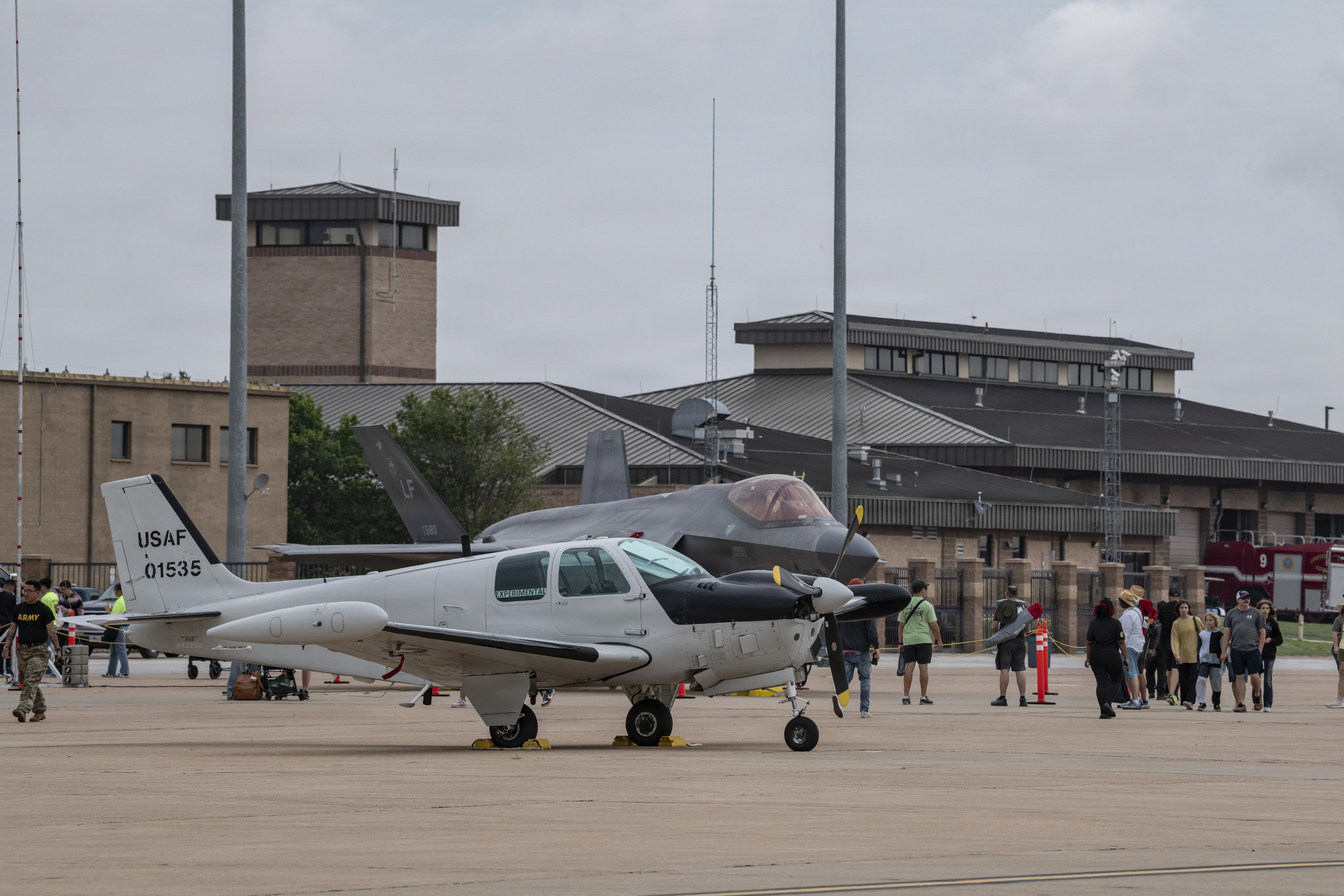
N22QU on display during the 2026 Wings Over Cannon airshow at Cannon Air Force Base.

A QU-22B, serial number 69‐7699, is on display in the Southeast Asia War Gallery at the National Museum of the United States Air Force. The aircraft has been on display since 2002.

At least two QU-22Bs remain airworthy as warbirds as of 2025. One of the aircraft is registered N22QU and has been demilitarized with the electronics, generator, and explosive bolts removed.

== Accidents and incidents ==
Although no QU-22Bs were lost in Vietnam due to ground fire, six aircraft crashed during missions, resulting in two pilots being killed. Four of these crashes were attributed to engine failures.

On 17 October 1984, a YQU-22A registered N83475 crashed into mountainous terrain in Fancy Gap, Virginia. The aircraft's wreckage was destroyed by a post-crash fire, and law enforcement officers estimated that the aircraft had been carrying 1,000 lb (450 kg) of marijuana at the time of the accident. The pilot, who was fatally injured, and the owner of the aircraft were not identified.

== Specifications (QU-22B) ==
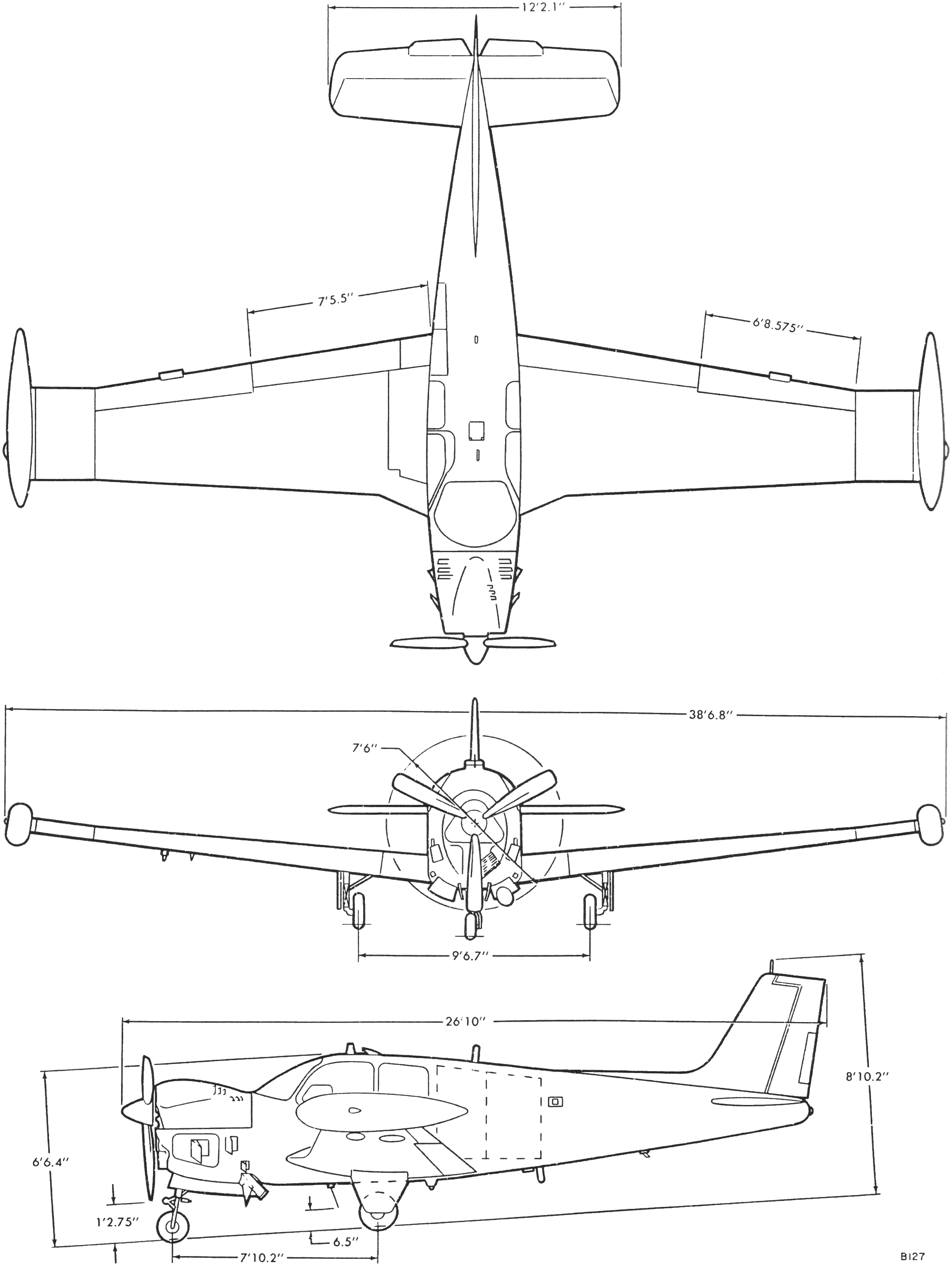
3-view drawing of a QU-22B Pave Eagle

Data from National Museum of the United States Air Force

General characteristics

- Length: 26.67 ft (8.13 m)
- Wingspan: 39.45 ft (12.02 m) with tip tanks
- Height: 8.45 ft (2.58 m)
- Gross weight: 4,800 lb (2,177 kg) (estimated)
- Powerplant: 1 × Continental GTSIO-520-G six-cylinder geared engine, 375 hp (280 kW)

Performance

- Maximum speed: 204 mph (328 km/h, 177 kn)
- Endurance: 10 hours (unmanned) or 6 hours (manned)
- Service ceiling: 30,000 ft (9,100 m) (unmanned) or 25,000 ft (7,600 m) (manned)

== See also ==
Related development

- Beechcraft Bonanza
- Bay Super V
- Beechcraft Baron
- Beechcraft T-34 Mentor
- Beechcraft Travel Air

Related lists

- List of military aircraft of the United States
