= Whitney Boomerang =

Boomerang DW200
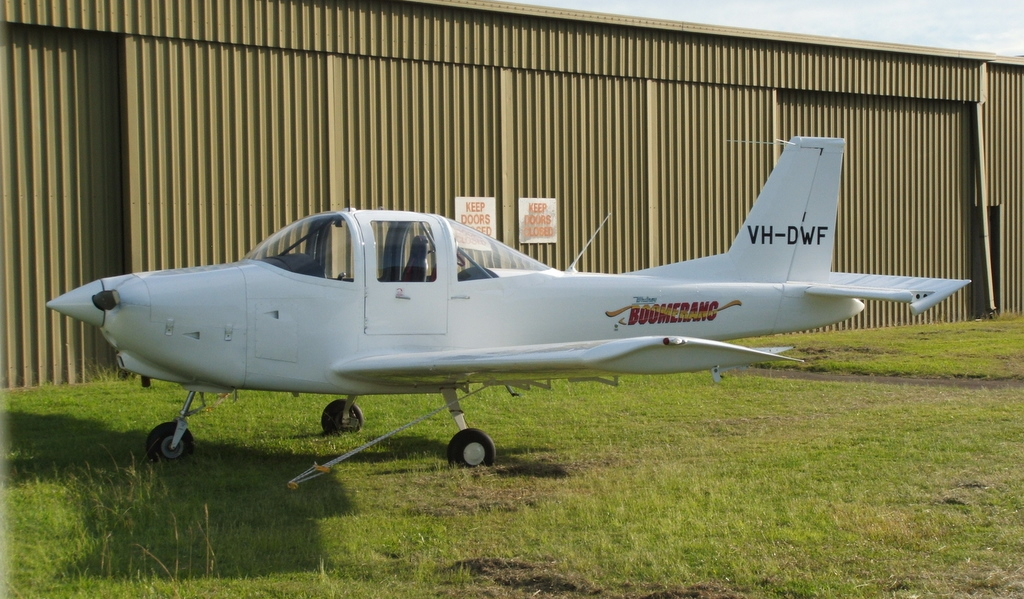

General information
- Type: Training aircraft
- National origin: Australia
- Manufacturer: Dean-Wilson Aviation Ltd
- Designer: C.W. Bill Whitney

History
- Manufactured: 2007–2011
- Introduction date: 2007
- First flight: 6 July 2006

The Whitney Boomerang DW200 is a two-seat, fixed tricycle gear general aviation airplane, originally designed for flight training, touring and personal use. It can be seen in active service at Darwin International, Brisbane's Archerfield and Perth's Jandakot general aviation airports.

== History ==
The Whitney Boomerang was designed by C.W. "Bill" Whitney as a replacement for the aging two-seat training aircraft fleets. The type certificate was granted on 18 December 2007 making the Boomerang only the 5th Australian aircraft to be granted an FAR 23 certificate. The Whitney Boomerang was produced by Dean Wilson Aviation located at Kingaroy Airport until 2011, when the company went into receivership. The machine has performed at several airshows and has also featured in media reports having made the trans-Tasman journey to New Zealand.

On Friday 27 May 2011, an advertisement appeared in the Aviation supplement of The Australian newspaper inviting expressions of interest in acquiring the assets of the companies manufacturing the Whitney Boomerang. The assets were listed as the Type Certificate, aircraft, plant and equipment, parts and tooling for aircraft manufacture and the hangar housing production facilities at Kingaroy, Queensland. The advertisement was inserted under instructions from the receivers and managers of Dean-Wilson Aviation P/L and Queensland Aviation Manufacturing P/L.

A notice on the SM Aviation website states:

SM Aviation has been appointed by Price Waterhouse in Brisbane to carry out the sale of assets of Dean-Wilson Aviation and QLD Aircraft Manufacturing (receivers and managers appointed). Simon Mathews will personally oversee the sale of the business, its intellectual property and assets located at Kingaroy in Queensland, Australia.

== Specifications ==
Data from Dean-Wilson Aviation Ltd

General characteristics

- Crew: 1
- Capacity: 2 people, 225 kg (496 lbs) useful load
- Length: 6.46 m (21 ft 2 in)
- Wingspan: 9.80 m (32 ft 2 in)
- Wing area: 13.72 m^{2} (147.68 sq ft)
- Empty weight: 600 kg (1,323 lb)
- Max takeoff weight: 825 kg (1,819 lb)
- Powerplant: 1 × Textron Lycoming O-235 air-cooled, horizontally opposed, four cylinder reciprocating engine, 88 kW (118 hp)
- Propellers: McCauley fixed-pitch two-bladed aluminium

Performance

- Cruise speed: 176 km/h (109 mph, 95 kn)
- Stall speed: 85 km/h (53 mph, 46 kn)
- Never exceed speed: 282 km/h (175 mph, 152 kn)

== See also ==
Aircraft of comparable role, configuration, and era

- Alpha 2000 (Robin R2000)
- Beechcraft Skipper
- Cessna 150
- Cessna 152
- Grumman American AA-1
- Piper Tomahawk
