= Javelin Aircraft =

Defunct American aircraft manufacturer

Javelin Aircraft Company
- Company type: Privately held company
- Industry: Aerospace
- Founded: 1970s
- Defunct: after 1998
- Fate: Out of business
- Headquarters: Wichita, Kansas, United States
- Products: Homebuilt aircraft plans

The Javelin Aircraft Company was an American aircraft manufacturer based in Wichita, Kansas. The company specialized in the design and manufacture of homebuilt aircraft in the form of plans for amateur construction.

The company was noted for its Javelin V6 STOL, which took a standard certified Piper PA-20 Pacer airframe and provided plans to replace the powerplant with a Ford Motor Company V6 engine of 210 to 300 hp (157 to 224 kW) and register the aircraft in the Experimental Amateur-built category.

Projects undertaken in the 1980s included the single-seat T200A, which was a high altitude, long range surveillance and TV signal relay aircraft with a ceiling of 40,000 to 50,000 ft (12,192 to 15,240 m) and the Mullens Phoenix, a development of the Bede BD-2 for a long-distance record attempt. The Phoenix had a wingspan of 63.0 ft (19.20 m) and was powered by a Lycoming O-540 of 210 hp (157 kW).

== Aircraft ==
Summary of aircraft built by Javelin Aircraft Company
Model name	First flight	Number built	Type
Javelin T200A	1980s		Surveillance and TV signal relay aircraft
Javelin V6 STOL	1980s	At least 25	Automotive engine conversion
Javelin Wichawk	24 May 1971	At least 18	homebuilt biplane
Mullens Phoenix	1981	1	Developed from Bede BD-2 for long-distance record attempt
