= PA16 =

PA16 may refer to:

- Pennsylvania Route 16
- Pennsylvania's 16th congressional district
- Piper PA-16 Clipper
