= Piper PA-15 Vagabond =

1940s American light aircraft

PA-15 & PA-17 Vagabond
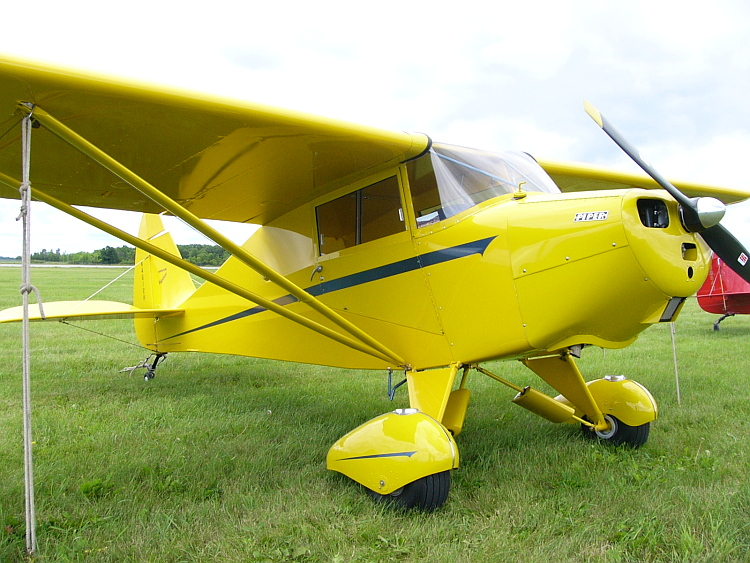
- PA-17 Vagabond

General information
- Type: Personal and training aircraft
- National origin: United States
- Manufacturer: Piper Aircraft
- Number built: 601

History
- Introduction date: January 1948 (PA-15); 1949 (PA-17)
- First flight: November 3, 1947 (PA-15)
- Developed from: Piper J-3 Cub

The Piper PA-15 Vagabond and PA-17 Vagabond are both two-seat, high-wing, conventional gear light aircraft that were designed for personal use and for flight training and built by Piper Aircraft starting in 1948.

== Development ==
The PA-15 was the first post-World War II Piper aircraft design. It utilized much of the same production tooling that created the famous Piper Cub, as well as many of the Cub structural components (tail surfaces, landing gear, most of the wing parts). The Vagabond has a wing that is one bay shorter (30 ft (9.1 m) versus 36 ft (11.0 m)) than that on the Cub, which led to the unofficial term describing the type: Short Wing Piper. This allowed the aircraft to be built with minimal material, design and development costs, and is credited with saving Piper Aircraft from bankruptcy after the war.

The prototype PA-15 made its first flight on November 3, 1947, with deliveries of production aircraft beginning in January 1948.

Vagabonds used a new fuselage with side-by-side seating for two instead of the Cub's tandem seating.

The PA-17 Vagabond version features dual controls, enabling it to be used for pilot training. It has a bungee cord shock-absorbed landing gear (solid gear on the PA-15), and a 65 hp (48 kW) Continental A-65 engine. There was a small increase in climb rate and useful load over the PA-15, despite an increase in empty weight.

The Vagabond was followed by the Piper PA-16 Clipper, which is essentially a Vagabond with a 17 in (43 cm) longer fuselage, Lycoming O-235 engine of 108 hp (81 kW), extra wing fuel tank, and four seats. The Pacer, Tri-Pacer and Colt are all variations of the Vagabond design and thus all Short Wing Pipers.

== Operational history ==
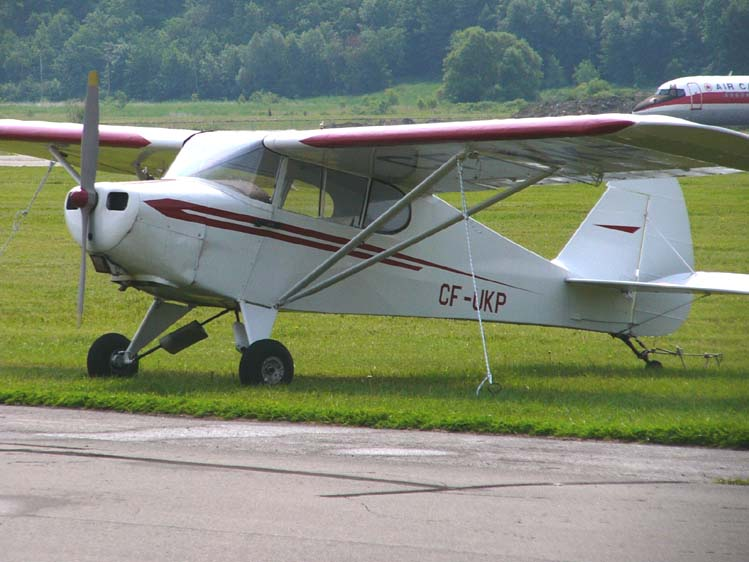
Piper PA-17 Vagabond

In March 2018 there were still 167 PA-15s and 101 PA-17s registered in the USA.

There were 13 PA-15s and 12 PA-17s registered in Canada in March 2018.

== Variants ==
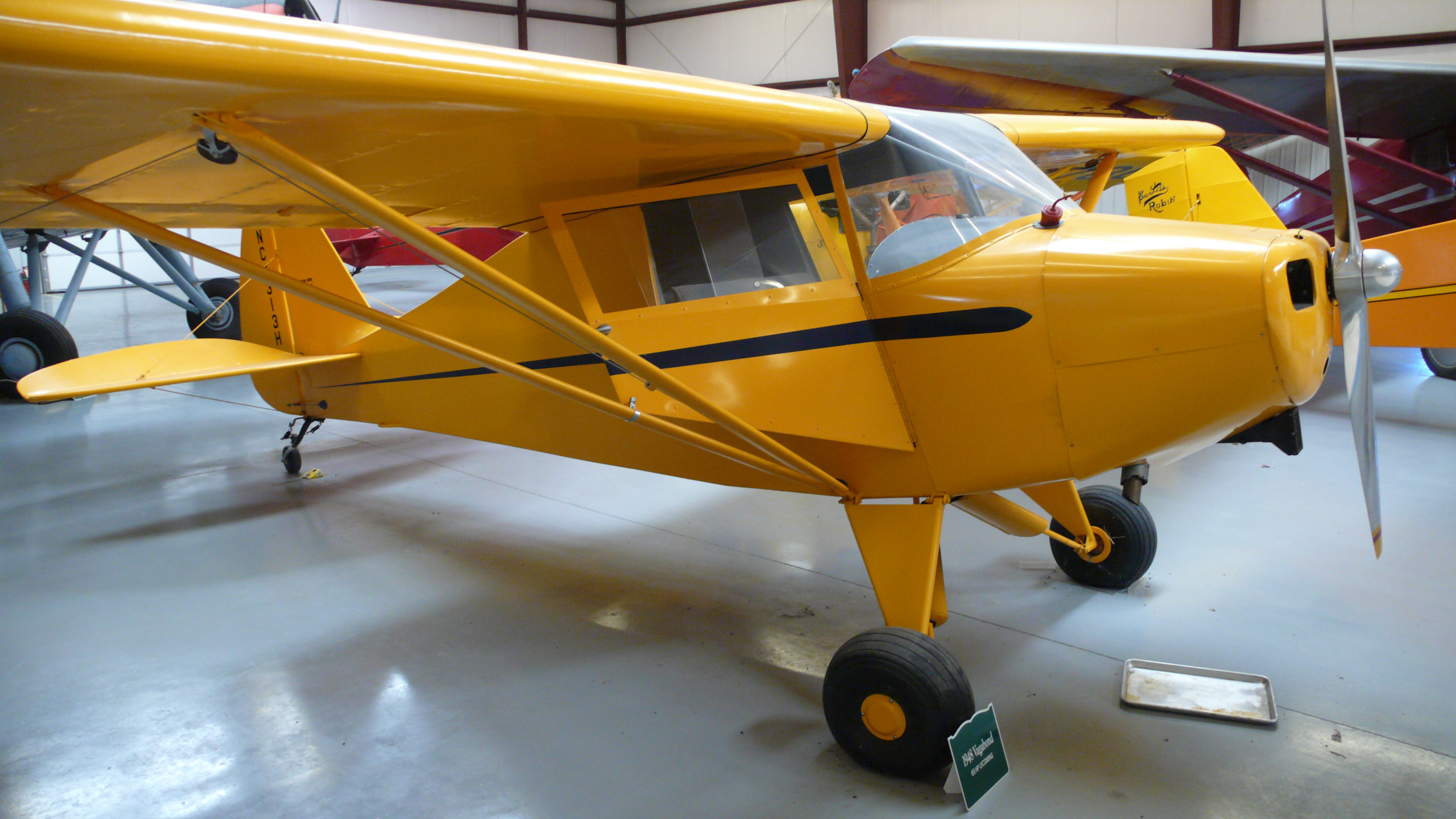
1948 Piper PA-15 Vagabond at the Historic Aircraft Restoration Museum.

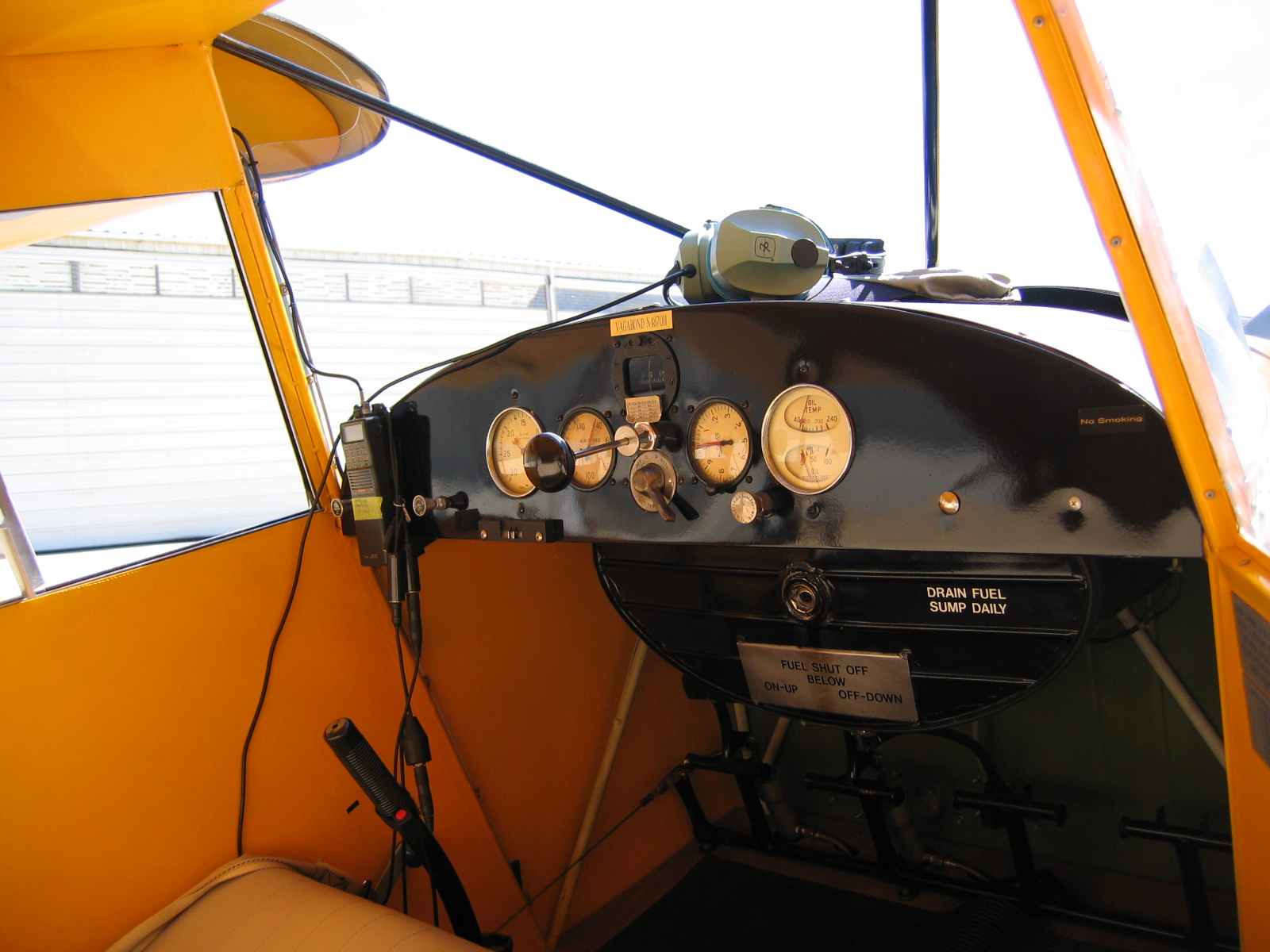
PA-17 interior

PA-15 Vagabond
Side-by-side two-seater powered by one 65 hp (48 kW) Lycoming O-145 engine. 387 built, plus one converted from a PA-17.
PA-17 Vagabond
Also known as the Vagabond Trainer a variant of the PA-15 with dual-controls, shock-cord suspension and powered by one 65 hp (48 kW) Continental A-65-8 engine. 214 built.

== Specifications (PA-15) ==
Data from 1978 Aircraft Directory

General characteristics

- Crew: one
- Capacity: one passenger
- Length: 18 ft 8 in (5.69 m)
- Wingspan: 29 ft 3 1/8 in (8.92 m)
- Height: 6 ft (1.8 m)
- Wing area: 147.5 sq ft (13.70 m^{2})
- Airfoil: USA 35B
- Empty weight: 630 lb (286 kg)
- Gross weight: 1,100 lb (499 kg)
- Fuel capacity: 12 U.S. gallons (45 L; 10.0 imp gal)
- Powerplant: 1 × Lycoming O-145 4-cylinder air-cooled horizontally-opposed piston engine, 65 hp (48 kW)
- Propellers: 2-bladed fixed-pitch propeller

Performance

- Maximum speed: 100 mph (160 km/h, 87 kn)
- Cruise speed: 90 mph (140 km/h, 78 kn)
- Stall speed: 45 mph (72 km/h, 39 kn)
- Range: 250 mi (400 km, 220 nmi)
- Service ceiling: 10,000 ft (3,000 m)
- Absolute ceiling: 11,500 ft (3,500 m)
- Rate of climb: 510 ft/min (2.6 m/s)
- Wing loading: 7.5 lb/sq ft (37 kg/m^{2})
- Power/mass: 0.06 hp/lb (0.099 kW/kg)
- Take-off run: 900 ft (270 m)
- Landing run: 300 ft (91 m)

== See also ==
- 1948 in aviation (first flight)

Related development:

- Piper Pacer

Comparable aircraft:

- Cessna 120/140
- RagWing RW11 Rag-A-Bond
- Wag-Aero Wag-a-Bond
