= Piper PA-16 Clipper =

1940s American light aircraft

PA-16 Clipper
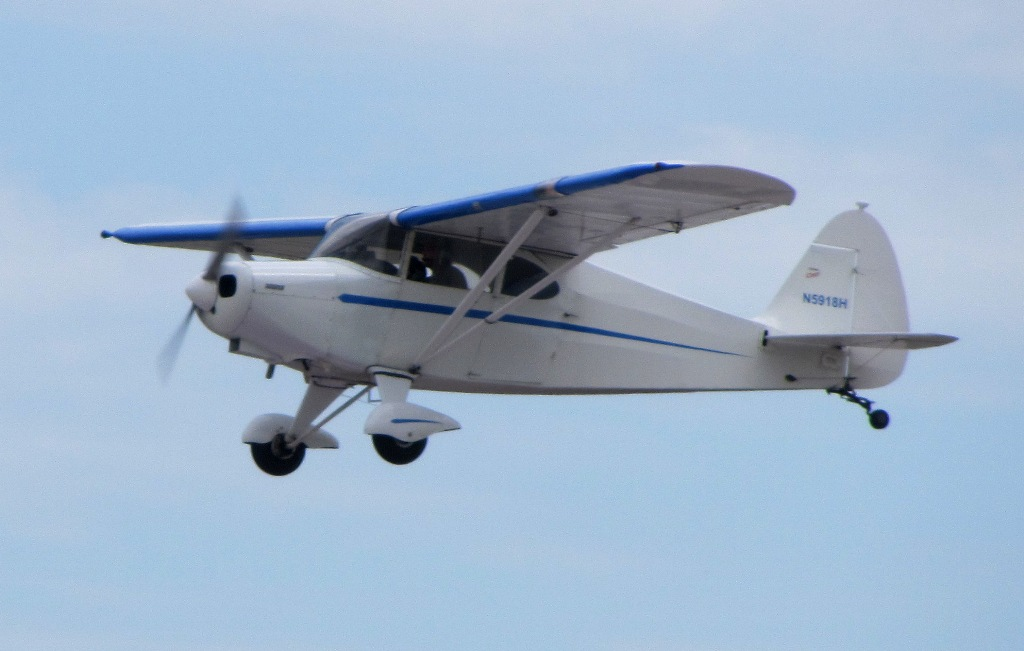
- Piper PA-16 Clipper in flight

General information
- Type: PA-16 Clipper
- Manufacturer: Piper Aircraft
- Number built: 736

History
- Manufactured: only in 1949
- Introduction date: 1949
- First flight: 1947
- Variant: Piper PA-20 Pacer

The Piper PA-16 Clipper is an extended fuselage model of the PA-15 Vagabond. Both models were designed in 1947 for the same reason – Piper Aircraft found itself in dire financial straits and needed to create new, competitive models using existing parts and tooling. The result was the Vagabond, essentially a side-by-side version of the tandem J-3 Cub credited with saving the company.

== Design and development ==
The PA-16 Clipper is a stretched and refined version of the Vagabond intended to seat four people (or "two-and-a-half to three" as often told by Clipper pilots). It is equipped with an extra wing tank, added doors to accommodate the new seating, and a Lycoming O-235, the same engine that would later power the Cessna 152. The PA-16 Clipper retained the control sticks that had up to that point been common in aircraft derived from the "Cub" family.

In 1949, the Clipper sold for $2995. The average four-place airplane on the market at that time cost over $5000. Only 736 Clippers were built in the one year of production before Piper changed to the Piper PA-20 Pacer.

Pan Am Airlines, which traditionally called its famous luxury airliners "Clippers", took offense at Piper using the name for its light aircraft. As a result of this pressure Piper further refined the model, adding wing flaps, further fuel tanks and replaced the control sticks with yokes. A more powerful Lycoming O-290 125 hp engine was installed and this model became the Piper PA-20 Pacer.

== Operational history ==
Despite the low number of aircraft built, according to the Federal Aviation Administration, in April 2018 there were still 303 examples in service in the United States.

== Specifications (PA-16) ==
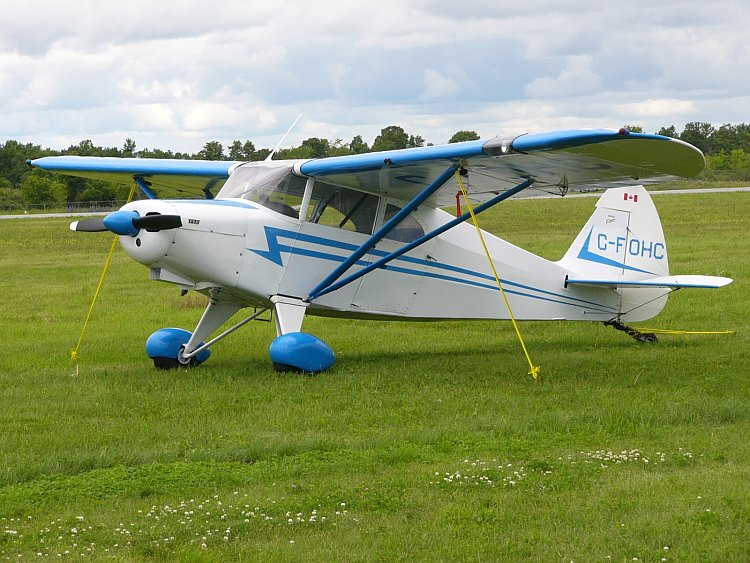
Piper PA-16 Clipper at the Short Wing Piper Convention in Kingston, Ontario on 6 July 2006

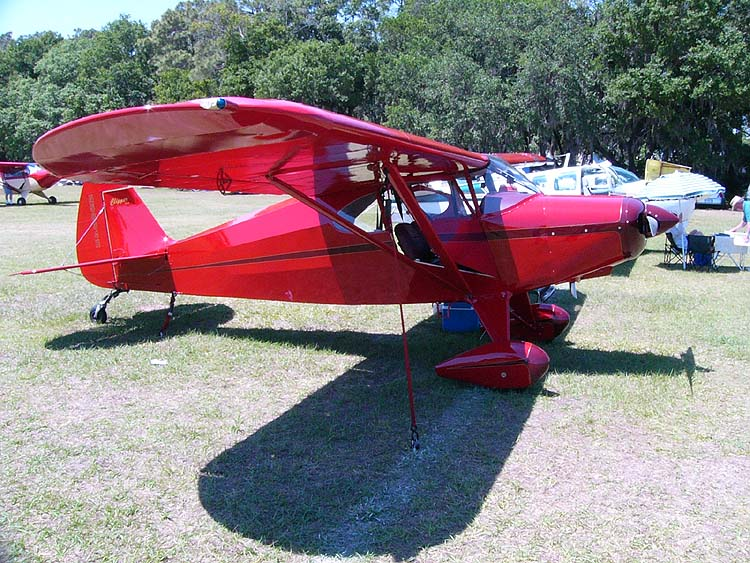
A Piper PA-16 Clipper at Sun 'n Fun 2006

Data from Plane and Pilot:1978 Aircraft Directory and Fonden Danmarks Flymuseum.

General characteristics

- Crew: one
- Capacity: three passengers (798 lb (362 kg) useful load)
- Length: 20 ft 1 in (6.12 m)
- Wingspan: 29 ft 3 in (8.92 m)
- Height: 6 ft 2 in (1.88 m)
- Empty weight: 850 lb (385 kg)
- Gross weight: 1,650 lb (750 kg)
- Max takeoff weight: 1,650 lb (748 kg)
- Powerplant: 1 × Lycoming O-235 with cruise pitch propeller, 115 hp (86 kW)

Performance

- Maximum speed: 109 kn (125 mph, 203 km/h)
- Cruise speed: 102 kn (117 mph, 188 km/h)
- Stall speed: 43 kn (50 mph, 80 km/h)
- Never exceed speed: 122 kn (140 mph, 225 km/h)
- Range: 417 nmi (480 mi, 778 km)
- Service ceiling: 11,000 ft (3,385 m)
- Rate of climb: 580 ft/min (2.9 m/s)
- Power/mass: 0.070 hp/lb (0.115 kW/kg)

Avionics
Originally none were fitted. Many now have VHF Nav-com radios, GPS and transponders installed.

== See also ==
Related development

- PA-15/17 Vagabond
- PA-20 Pacer, PA-22 Tri-Pacer/Caribbean, PA-22-108 Colt

Aircraft of comparable role, configuration, and era

- Cessna 170
