= Lucas L7 =

French homebuilt aircraft

L7

General information
- Type: Amateur-built aircraft
- National origin: France
- Designer: Emile Lucas
- Status: Plans available (2012)

The Lucas L7, also called the L 7 and L-7, is a French amateur-built aircraft that was designed by Emile Lucas of Lagny-le-Sec. The aircraft is supplied in the form of plans for amateur construction.

== Design and development ==
The L7 features a strut-braced high-wing, a two-seats-in-side-by-side configuration enclosed cockpit with doors for access, fixed main tricycle landing gear with a retractable nosewheel and a single engine in tractor configuration.

The aircraft is made from sheet aluminum. Its 10 m (32.8 ft) span wing has an area of 12 m^{2} (130 sq ft) and mounts both flaps and leading edge slots for STOL performance. The standard engine used is the 118 hp (88 kW) Lycoming O-235 four-stroke powerplant which provides a cruise speed of 175 km/h (109 mph).

Reviewers Roy Beisswenger and Marino Boric described the design in a 2015 review as have a "somewhat boxy shape".

== Specifications (L7) ==
Data from Bayerl and Tacke

General characteristics

- Crew: one
- Capacity: one passenger
- Wingspan: 10 m (32 ft 10 in)
- Wing area: 12 m^{2} (130 sq ft)
- Empty weight: 500 kg (1,102 lb)
- Gross weight: 750 kg (1,653 lb)
- Fuel capacity: 120 litres (26 imp gal; 32 US gal)
- Powerplant: 1 × Lycoming O-235 four cylinder, air-cooled, four stroke aircraft engine, 88 kW (118 hp)
- Propellers: 2-bladed metal

Performance

- Maximum speed: 190 km/h (120 mph, 100 kn)
- Cruise speed: 175 km/h (109 mph, 94 kn)
- Stall speed: 70 km/h (43 mph, 38 kn)
- Rate of climb: 3.5 m/s (690 ft/min)
- Wing loading: 62.5 kg/m^{2} (12.8 lb/sq ft)
