= Stern ST 87 Vega =

French homebuilt aircraft

ST 87 Vega

General information
- Type: Homebuilt aircraft
- National origin: France
- Designer: Rene Stern
- Status: Plans available (2014)
- Number built: 2 (1998)

History
- First flight: July 1992

The Stern ST 87 Vega (sometimes ST-87) is a French homebuilt aircraft that was designed by Rene Stern, first flying in July 1992. The aircraft is supplied in the form of plans for amateur construction.

== Design and development ==
The ST 87 Vega features a cantilever low-wing, a two-seats-in-side-by-side configuration enclosed cockpit under a bubble canopy, fixed conventional landing gear with wheel pants and a single engine in tractor configuration.

The aircraft is made from wood, with its flying surfaces covered in doped aircraft fabric. Its 7.62 m (25.0 ft) span wing mounts flaps and has a wing area of 10.0 m^{2} (108 sq ft). The cabin width is 110 cm (43 in). The acceptable power range is 85 to 125 hp (63 to 93 kW) and the standard engine used is the 108 hp (81 kW) Lycoming O-235 powerplant.

The ST 87 Vega has a typical empty weight of 469 kg (1,034 lb) and a gross weight of 726 kg (1,601 lb), giving a useful load of 257 kg (567 lb). With full fuel of 110 litres (24 imp gal; 29 US gal) the payload for the pilot, passenger and baggage is 175 kg (386 lb).

The manufacturer estimates the construction time from the supplied kit as 2000 hours.

== Operational history ==
By 1998 the company reported that four kits had been sold and two aircraft were completed and flying.

== Specifications (ST 87 Vega) ==
Data from AeroCrafter

General characteristics

- Crew: one
- Capacity: one passenger
- Wingspan: 7.62 m (25.00 ft)
- Wing area: 10.0 m^{2} (108 sq ft)
- Empty weight: 469 kg (1,035 lb)
- Gross weight: 726 kg (1,600 lb)
- Fuel capacity: 110 litres (24 imp gal; 29 US gal) standard, a total of 260 litres (57 imp gal; 69 US gal) optional
- Powerplant: 1 × Lycoming O-235 four cylinder, air-cooled, four stroke aircraft engine, 81 kW (108 hp)
- Propellers: 2-bladed metal fixed pitch

Performance

- Maximum speed: 240 km/h (150 mph, 130 kn)
- Cruise speed: 201 km/h (125 mph, 109 kn)
- Stall speed: 80 km/h (50 mph, 43 kn) flaps down
- Range: 1,210 km (750 mi, 650 nmi)
- Service ceiling: 4,000 m (13,000 ft)
- Rate of climb: 3.6 m/s (700 ft/min)
- Wing loading: 72 kg/m^{2} (14.8 lb/sq ft)
