= Piper PA-38 Tomahawk =

1978 utility aircraft series by Piper

PA-38 Tomahawk
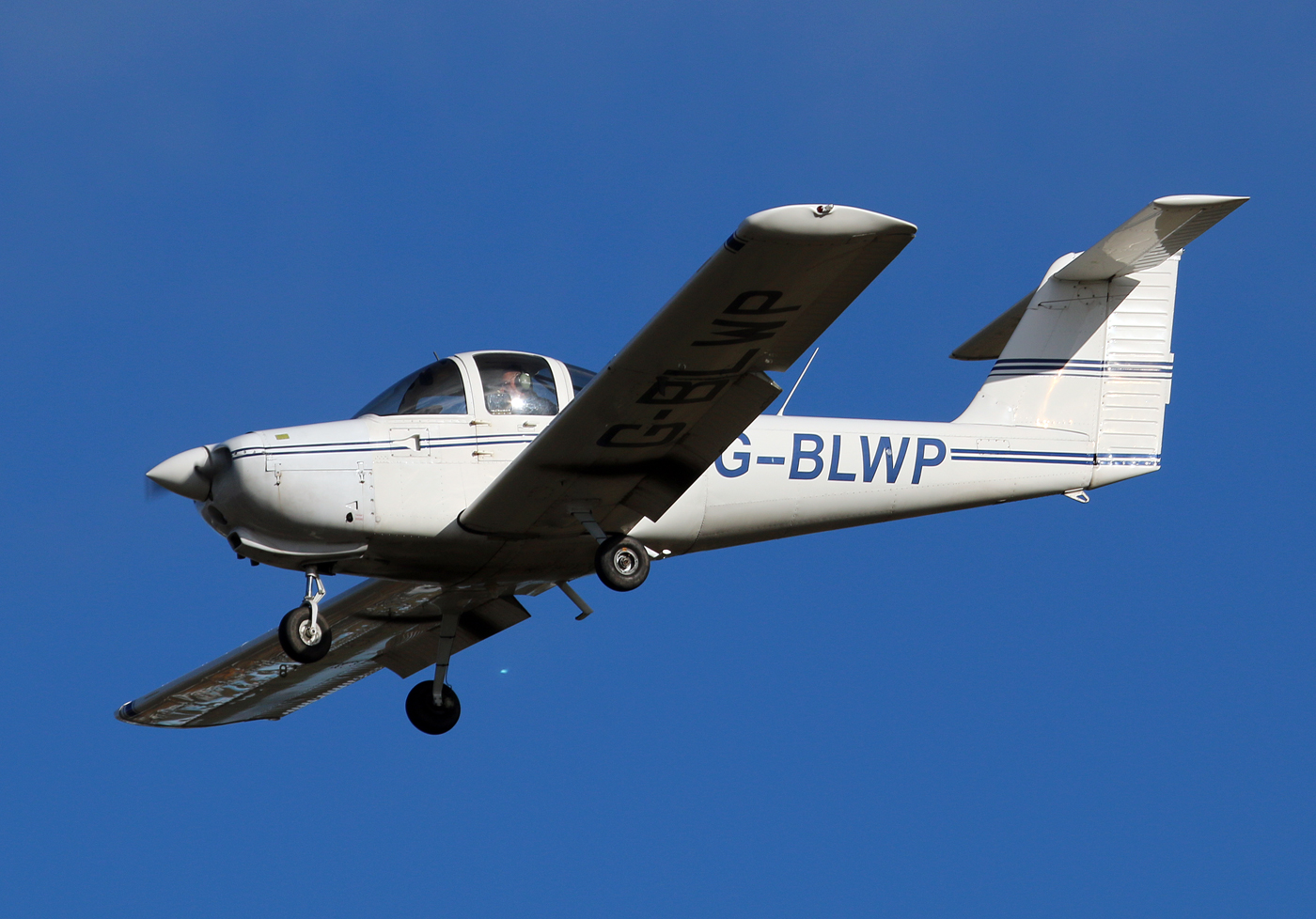

General information
- Type: Light aircraft
- Manufacturer: Piper
- Number built: 2,484

History
- Manufactured: 1978–1982
- Introduction date: 1978

The Piper PA-38-112 Tomahawk is a twin-seat general aviation aircraft designed and produced by the American aircraft manufacturer Piper. Designed specifically to be used for flight training, it can also be used for both touring and personal use.

== Design and development ==
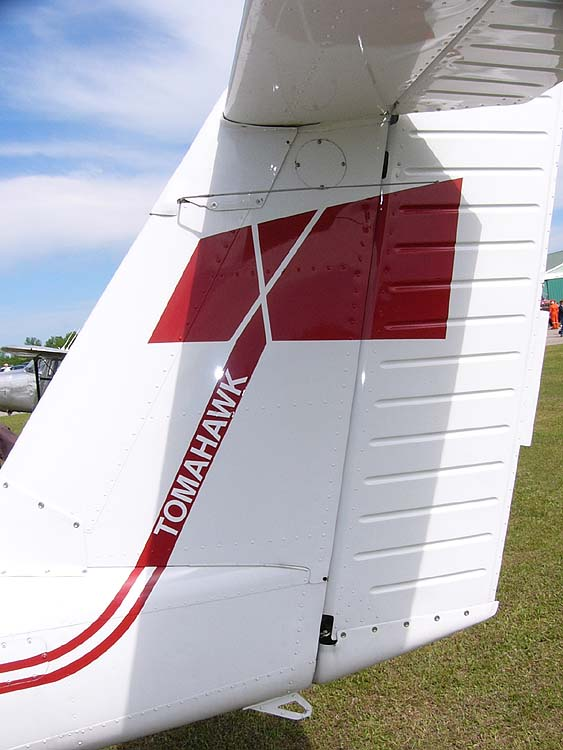
The axe logo was applied at the Piper factory to many PA-38s delivered

The Tomahawk originated in the mid 1970s in Piper's ambitions to create an affordable two-place aircraft optimised for use as a trainer aircraft. Before proceeding forward to the design phase, the company conducted extensive market research, surveying roughly 10,000 flight instructors to collect input into the design as well as their views on the physical aspects and handling characteristics of the optimal training aircraft. Many of these instructors requested a more spinnable aircraft, since most contemporary twin-seat trainers, such as the Cessna 150 and 152, were designed to spontaneously fly out of a spin. Other sought criteria included a simplistic and accessible fuel system, favourable visibility, ample cabin space, and somewhat heavy flight controls, the latter feature being useful in preparing trainee pilots for flying other aircraft.

The Tomahawk is a single-engined low-wing cantilever monoplane with fixed tricycle landing gear and a T-tail. One consequence of the T-tail arrangement is that the responsiveness of the elevator drops considerably when at flown at low air speeds, although this tendency is not an issue for a prepared pilot. The aircraft has a bubble-shaped enclosed cockpit with room for up to two occupants, which is accessed via a pair of front-hinged doors. To provide the occupants with a high degree of external visibility, this cockpit is provided with extensive wrap-around windows. The pilot's field of vision is further boosted by the relatively low placement of the Tomahawk's wing. The cockpit was typically provision with basic instrumentation for visual flight rules, although kits existed to add more extensive instruments.

It is powered by a Lycoming O-235 four-cylinder piston engine that drives a twin-bladed fixed-pitch metal propeller. For ease of maintenance, this engine can be accessed via a fairly large double-opening cowling; accessibility is such that the engine can be taken out while the propeller remains attached. The flight controls are relatively heavy; consequently, the Tomahawk's handling resembles that of a substantially larger aircraft. Furthermore, it possesses a relatively slow stall speed of 56.5 mph, and the stall recovery procedure is entirely orthodox, the aircraft intentionally lacking any self-recovery tendencies. To achieve the spin characteristics sought by flight instructors, the Tomahawk was equipped with a NASA GA(W)-1 Whitcomb airfoil, which necessitates specific pilot input in order to recover from spins, thus allowing trainees to develop proficiency in dealing with spin recovery.

The Tomahawk was introduced in 1977 as a 1978 model; at the time, it was a fairly unique aircraft. Relatively quickly, the aircraft accumulated a series of airworthiness directives and service bulletins, resulting in changes and improvements. Incorporating these changes, the 1981 and 1982 models were designated as the Tomahawk II. Specific differences included the adoption of improved cabin heating and windshield defroster performance, an improved elevator trim system, improved engine thrust vector, 100 percent airframe zinc-chromate anti-corrosion treatment, better cockpit soundproofing, and larger 6" wheels and tires for greater propeller ground clearance and improved performance on grass and dirt runways, among other enhancements. In the long term, the Tomahawk II has proved to be more desirable that the more common early-build aircraft.

During the early 1980s, there was an industry-wide slump in demand for general aviation aircraft, which negatively impacted sales of the Tomahawk. Accordingly, in 1982, the company decided to terminate production of the Tomahawk, by which point 2,484 aircraft have been completed.

== Operational history ==
As of 2020, a handful of Tomahawks are currently being used to train Australian Air Force Cadets in flight courses. These are operated from RAAF Base Amberley by 211 Squadron AAFC. These aircraft have been in service since the early 2000s.

=== Safety record ===
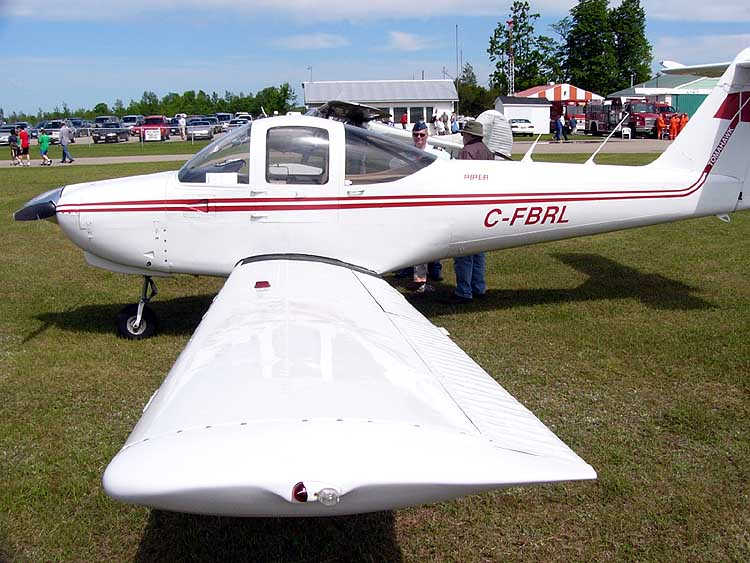
Stall strips were applied to the leading edge.

According to the Aircraft Owners and Pilots Association Air Safety Foundation, which published a Safety Highlight report on the Piper Tomahawk, the Piper Tomahawk has a one-third lower accident rate per flying hour than the comparable Cessna 150/152 series of two-place benchmark trainers. The Tomahawk has a higher rate of fatal spin accidents per flying hour. The National Transportation Safety Board (NTSB) estimated that the Tomahawk's stall/spin accident rate was three to five times that of the Cessna 150/152.

According to the NTSB, the Tomahawk's wing design was modified after FAA certification tests, but was not retested. Changes included reducing the number of full wing ribs and cutting lightening holes in the main spar. The aircraft's engineers told the NTSB that the changes made to the design resulted in a wing that was soft and flexible, allowing its shape to become distorted and possibly causing unpredictable behavior in stalls and spins. The design engineers said that the GAW-1 airfoil required a rigid structure because it was especially sensitive to airfoil shape, and that use of a flexible surface with that airfoil would make the Tomahawk wing "a new and unknown commodity in stalls and spins."

Airworthiness Directive 83-14-08, issued in September 1983, mandated the fitting of an additional pair of stall strips to the inboard leading edge of the PA-38's wing to "standardize and improve the stall characteristics".

== Operators ==
=== Military ===
Australia

- Australian Air Force Cadets

Indonesia

- Indonesian Navy

== Specifications (PA-38-112 Tomahawk II) ==
3-view line drawing of the Piper PA-38 Tomahawk

Data from Janes's All The World's Aircraft 1982–83

General characteristics

- Crew: one
- Capacity: one passenger
- Length: 23 ft 1 1/4 in (7.042 m)
- Wingspan: 34 ft 0 in (10.36 m)
- Height: 9 ft 0 3/4 in (2.762 m)
- Wing area: 124.7 sq ft (11.59 m^{2})
- Aspect ratio: 9.27:1
- Airfoil: NASA GAW-1
- Empty weight: 1,128 lb (512 kg)
- Max takeoff weight: 1,670 lb (757 kg)
- Fuel capacity: 30 US gal (25 imp gal; 110 L) usable
- Powerplant: 1 × Avco Lycoming O-235-L2C air-cooled flat-four piston engine, 112 hp (84 kW)
- Propellers: 2-bladed Sensenich metal fixed-pitch propeller, 6 ft 0 in (1.83 m) diameter

Performance

- Maximum speed: 126 mph (203 km/h, 109 kn) at sea level
- Cruise speed: 115 mph (185 km/h, 100 kn) at 10,500 ft (3,200 m) (65% power)
- Stall speed: 56.5 mph (90.9 km/h, 49.1 kn) (flaps down, IAS)
- Never exceed speed: 159 mph (256 km/h, 138 kn) (IAS)
- Range: 539 mi (867 km, 468 nmi) at 10,500 ft (3,200 m) (65% power)
- Service ceiling: 13,000 ft (4,000 m)
- Rate of climb: 718 ft/min (3.65 m/s)
- Takeoff run to 50 ft (15 m): 1,460 ft (450 m)
- Landing run from 50 ft (15 m): 1,544 ft (471 m)

== See also ==
Aircraft of comparable role, configuration, and era

- Aerotec A-132 Tangará
- Alpha 2000 (Robin R2000)
- Beechcraft Skipper
- Cessna 150
- Cessna 152
- Diamond DA20
- Grumman American AA-1
- Liberty XL2
- Symphony SA-160
- Whitney Boomerang
