= Javelin Wichawk =

Wichawk

General information
- Type: Homebuilt aircraft
- National origin: United States
- Manufacturer: Javelin Aircraft Company
- Designer: Dave Blanton
- Number built: at least 18 (2014)

History
- First flight: 24 May 1971

The Javelin Wichawk is a sporting biplane designed in the United States in the early 1970s and marketed in plan form for amateur construction.

== Design and development ==
The Wichawk is a conventional design with staggered single-bay wings of equal span braced with N-struts and having fixed, tailwheel undercarriage. The pilot and a single passenger sit in side-by-side configuration in an open cockpit, but the plans make allowances for the aircraft to be built in two- or three-seat tandem configuration instead. The fuselage and empennage are of welded steel tube construction, with the wings built with wooden spars and aluminium alloy ribs, all covered in doped aircraft fabric.

== Operational history ==
Some 250 sets of plans had been sold by 1987, with 14 aircraft known to be flying by then.

In January 2014 nine examples were registered in the United States with the Federal Aviation Administration, but a total of 18 had been registered at one time.

== Specifications ==
General characteristics

- Crew: one pilot
- Capacity: one passenger
- Length: 19 ft 3 in (5.87 m)
- Wingspan: 24 ft 0 in (7.32 m)
- Height: 7 ft 2 in (2.18 m)
- Wing area: 185 sq ft (17.2 m^{2})
- Empty weight: 1,280 lb (580 kg)
- Gross weight: 2,000 lb (907 kg)
- Powerplant: 1 × Lycoming O-360 , 180 hp (134 kW)

Performance

- Maximum speed: 140 mph (225 km/h, 120 kn)
- Rate of climb: 1,700 ft/min (8.6 m/s)
