= Beechcraft Skipper =

Two seat fixed gear general aviation aircraft

Model 77 Skipper
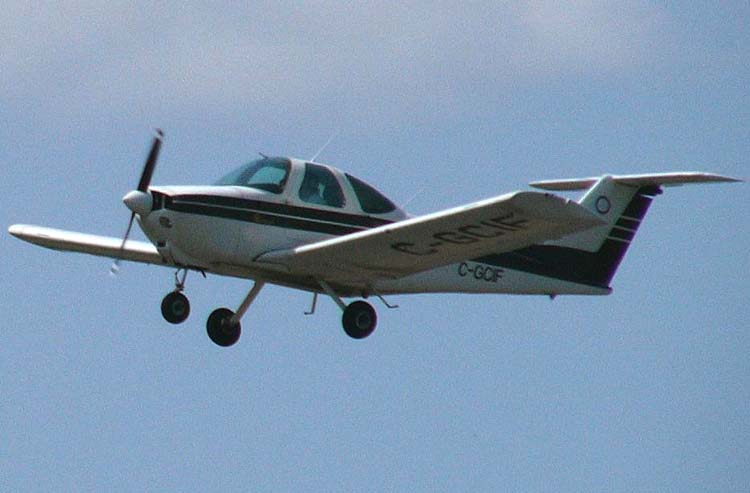

General information
- Type: Light utility aircraft
- Manufacturer: Beech Aircraft Corporation
- Number built: 312

History
- Manufactured: 1979-1983
- Introduction date: 1979
- First flight: September 12, 1978

The Beechcraft Model 77 Skipper is a twin-seat low-wing general aviation aircraft designed and produced by the Beech Aircraft Corporation. It was originally designed for flight training, but also used for touring and personal flying. A large proportion of the 312 aircraft built were used for student training across the various Beech Aero Clubs.

== Design and development ==
The Skipper was conceived of in the early-to-mid 1970s as an aircraft designed to be an economic primary trainer, key design goals included its ease of maintenance and low operating costs; it would also have to be competitive with incumbent aircraft in the twin-seat trainer market, such as the popular Cessna 150 line of trainer aircraft. Design work formally began in 1974, at which point the aircraft was referred to the PD 285. Production of the type was performed at Beechcraft's Liberal (Kansas) Division, where both the Beechcraft Duchess and Musketeer were also produced.

On February 6, 1975, The prototype made its maiden flight. While this prototype was originally flown with a conventional tail configuration fitted with a stabilator and flaperons; by the time the Skipper entered production, a T-tail configuration with conventional flaps and ailerons had been adopted instead, which gave the aircraft an appearance similar to its contemporary competitor, the Piper PA-38 Tomahawk. It was the third Beechcraft aircraft to feature a T-tail; this arrangement facilitates smoother flight by placing the horizontal stabilizer above the slipstream produced by the aircraft, instead remaining in undisturbed air; the T-tail also contributes to the aircraft maintaining positive control throughout the landing process.

The student pilot and instructor were seated in a side-by-side configuration within an canopy-type cabin that provides both occupants with favourable all-around external visibility via several relatively large wings and the aircraft's sloping nose; access is via a pair of doors on either side of the cabin. To aid in its intended use as a trainer aircraft, the Skipper was certified to routinely conduct intentional spins, and could be equipped with an intercom for better communication between the trainee and instructor. The Skipper was powered by the Lycoming O-235 engine, akin to both the Cessna and Piper trainers that comprised its primary competition.

The Skipper features all-metal construction, which incorporates a number of innovative construction techniques, including tubular spars and aluminum honeycomb construction with metal-to-metal bonding, a technique that Beechcraft had previously used the Musketeer family. Specific areas of the airframe that used bonded metal construction include the lower section of the cabin, the leading edge of the vertical stabilizer, trim tabs, rudder, and the entire wing. The aircraft's tricycle landing gear is mounted to the fuselage/wing junction and possesses a 5.17 ft (2 m) wide wheelbase, which gives the Skipper a "spraddle-legged" appearance on the ground. Relatively little maintenance is required by the main landing gear, which employs springs, and is designed for both sturdiness and utility. The nose gear employs an oleo strut.

The wing of the Skipper, which is supported by a tubular spar, produced relatively low drag and high lift via its use of a GA(W)-1 airfoil, which was specifically developed for low-speed aviation applications and based on research conducted by NASA in the 1970s. The leading edge of the wing near the fuselage features a strake that prevents airflow separation occurring at the wing root. The flaps and ailerons are both actuated via torque tubes, rather than cables. The responsiveness of the flight controls is balanced while the ailerons remain effective all speeds above stall. In advance of any stall, noticeable turbulence is produced by the wings.

The Skipper has been certified to flight under both visual flight rules (VFR) and instrument flight rules (IFR), at day and night, in accordance with FAR 91 or FAR 135.

== Operational history ==
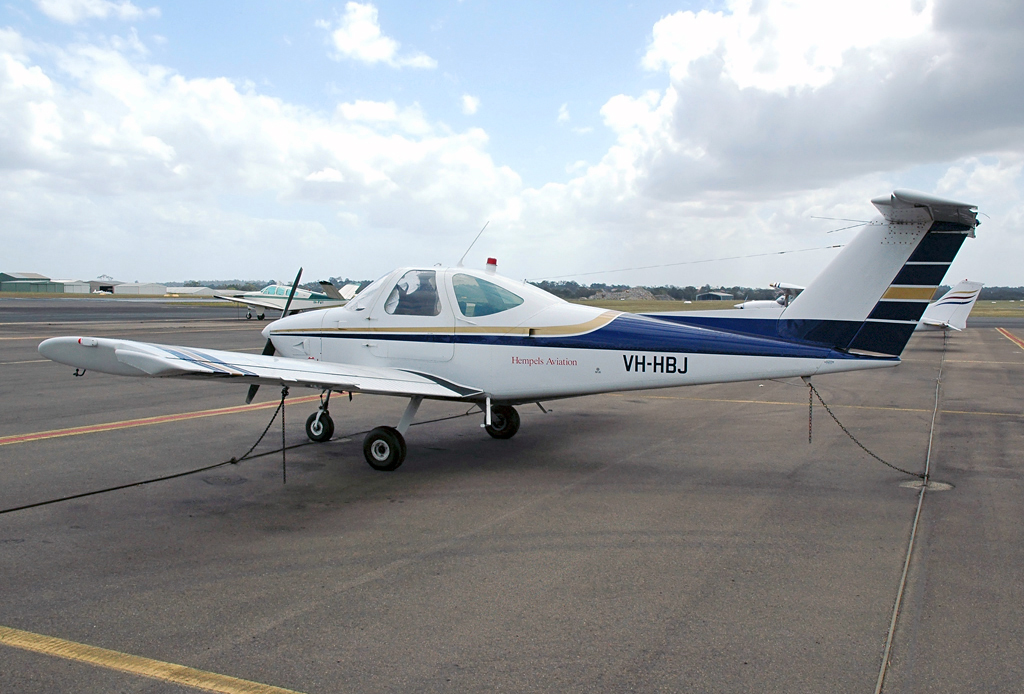
Beechcraft Skipper

The Skipper had the misfortune of being introduced at the beginning of a severe downturn in demand for general aviation aircraft in the United States. During 1979, 47 aircraft were built; this increased 140 aircraft in 1980, and declined to 125 aircraft in 1981. Production of the type was terminated in 1983, at which point 312 aircraft had been completed.

The majority of the type's production run was initially delivered to Beechcraft's flight school network, the Beech Aero Centers, where they were used as primary trainers. Into the twenty-first century, a handful of Skippers remained in use as trainers, while others are in the hands of private owners who use them as touring aircraft.

== Specifications ==
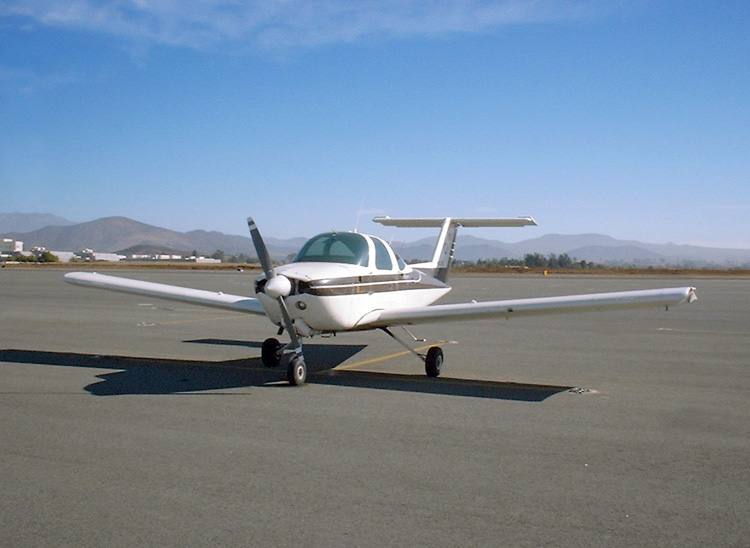
Beechcraft 77 Skipper

Data from Jane's All The World's Aircraft 1980–81 and Observer's Book of Aircraft 1981

General characteristics

- Crew: 2
- Length: 24 ft 0 in (7.32 m)
- Wingspan: 30 ft 0 in (9.14 m)
- Height: 7 ft 11 in (2.41 m)
- Wing area: 129.8 sq ft (12.1 m^{2})
- Airfoil: GA(W)-1
- Empty weight: 1,100 lb (499 kg)
- Max takeoff weight: 1,675 lb (760 kg)
- Powerplant: 1 × Lycoming O-235-L2C four-cylinder, air-cooled, horizontally opposed, piston aero engine, 115 hp (86 kW)

Performance

- Cruise speed: 105 kn (121 mph, 195 km/h)
- Stall speed: 47 kn (54 mph, 87 km/h) (flaps down)
- Range: 412 nmi (475 mi, 764 km) at 8,500 ft (2,600 m) (econ cruise)
- Service ceiling: 12,900 ft (3,930 m)
- Rate of climb: 720 ft/min (3.65 m/s)

== See also ==
Aircraft of comparable role, configuration, and era

- Cessna 150
- Cessna 152
- Grumman American AA-1
- Liberty XL2
- Piper PA-38 Tomahawk
- Symphony SA-160
- Whitney Boomerang
