= Javelin V6 STOL =

American homebuilt STOL aircraft

V6 STOL

General information
- Type: Homebuilt aircraft
- National origin: United States
- Manufacturer: Javelin Aircraft
- Status: Production completed
- Number built: At least 25

History
- Developed from: Piper PA-20 Pacer

The Javelin V6 STOL is an American STOL homebuilt aircraft that was designed and produced by Javelin Aircraft of Wichita, Kansas. When it was available the aircraft was supplied in the form of plans for amateur construction.

== Design and development ==
The V6 STOL consists of plans to power an existing certified Piper PA-20 Pacer airframe with a Ford Motor Company V6 engine and moving it from the Certified Category to the Experimental Amateur-built category.

The aircraft features a strut-braced high wing, a four-seat enclosed cabin accessed via doors, fixed conventional landing gear and a single engine in tractor configuration.

Since it uses a standard Piper Pacer airframe, the aircraft is made from welded steel tubing, covered in doped aircraft fabric. Its 32.00 ft (9.8 m) span wing employs a USA 35B airfoil, mounts flaps and has a wing area of 168.00 sq ft (15.608 m^{2}). The standard conversion installs a 230 hp (172 kW) Ford V6 powerplant, driving a fixed pitch propeller, although engines of up to 300 hp (224 kW) can be employed. The 230 hp (172 kW) engine gives the aircraft a sea level, standard day takeoff distance of 150 ft (46 m) and a landing distance of 300 ft (91 m).

The V6 STOL has a typical empty weight of 1,200 lb (540 kg) and a gross weight of 2,200 lb (1,000 kg), giving a useful load of 1,000 lb (450 kg). With full fuel of 36 U.S. gallons (140 L; 30 imp gal) the payload for pilot, passengers and baggage is 784 lb (356 kg).

The manufacturer estimates the time to complete the conversion from the supplied plans as 400 hours.

== Operational history ==
In January 2014, 14 examples were registered in the United States with the Federal Aviation Administration, but a total of 25 had been registered at one time.

== Specifications (V6 STOL) ==
Data from AeroCrafter and The Incomplete Guide to Airfoil Usage

General characteristics

- Crew: one
- Capacity: three passengers
- Length: 22 ft 3 in (6.78 m)
- Wingspan: 32 ft 0 in (9.75 m)
- Wing area: 168.00 sq ft (15.608 m^{2})
- Airfoil: USA 35B
- Empty weight: 1,200 lb (544 kg)
- Gross weight: 2,200 lb (998 kg)
- Fuel capacity: 36 U.S. gallons (140 L; 30 imp gal)
- Powerplant: 1 × Ford Motor Company V6 six cylinder, liquid-cooled, four stroke automotive conversion engine, 230 hp (170 kW)
- Propellers: 2-bladed fixed pitch

Performance

- Maximum speed: 140 mph (230 km/h, 120 kn)
- Cruise speed: 130 mph (210 km/h, 110 kn)
- Stall speed: 52 mph (84 km/h, 45 kn)
- Range: 700 mi (1,100 km, 610 nmi)
- Service ceiling: 18,000 ft (5,500 m)
- Rate of climb: 1,800 ft/min (9.1 m/s)
- Wing loading: 13.1 lb/sq ft (64 kg/m^{2})
