= Lycoming O-233 =

Four-cylinder, air-cooled, horizontally opposed piston engine

O-233
- Type: Piston aero engine
- National origin: United States
- Manufacturer: Lycoming Engines
- First run: 1940
- Manufactured: 1940-1944
- Number built: 106
- Developed from: Lycoming O-145
- Developed into: Lycoming O-235

The Lycoming O-233 is a four-cylinder, air-cooled, horizontally opposed piston aircraft engine that was built by Lycoming Engines between 1940 and 1944.

== Development ==
Lycoming applied for certification of the O-233 on 13 June 1940, with certification to CAR 13 (amended to 31 May 1938) granted on 16 August 1940. The O-233 had its type certificate cancelled on 25 February 1944 at serial number 106.

The FAA type certificate notes:

No engines of these models manufactured after the date or with serial numbers above those listed below are eligible for use in certificated aircraft. (The early production engines may still be used in certificated aircraft or installed under a supplemental type certificate). Detail specifications for these engines have been deleted from this data sheet.

== Variants ==
O-233-A1
Sole variant, type certification cancelled 25 February 1944

== Specifications (O-233-A1) ==
Data from TCDS

=== General characteristics ===
- Type: Four-cylinder, horizontally opposed piston engine

=== Components ===
- Cooling system: Air-cooled

== See also ==
Related lists

- List of aircraft engines
