= Piper PA-20 Pacer =

1950s American light aircraft

PA-20 Pacer & PA-22 Tri-Pacer Family
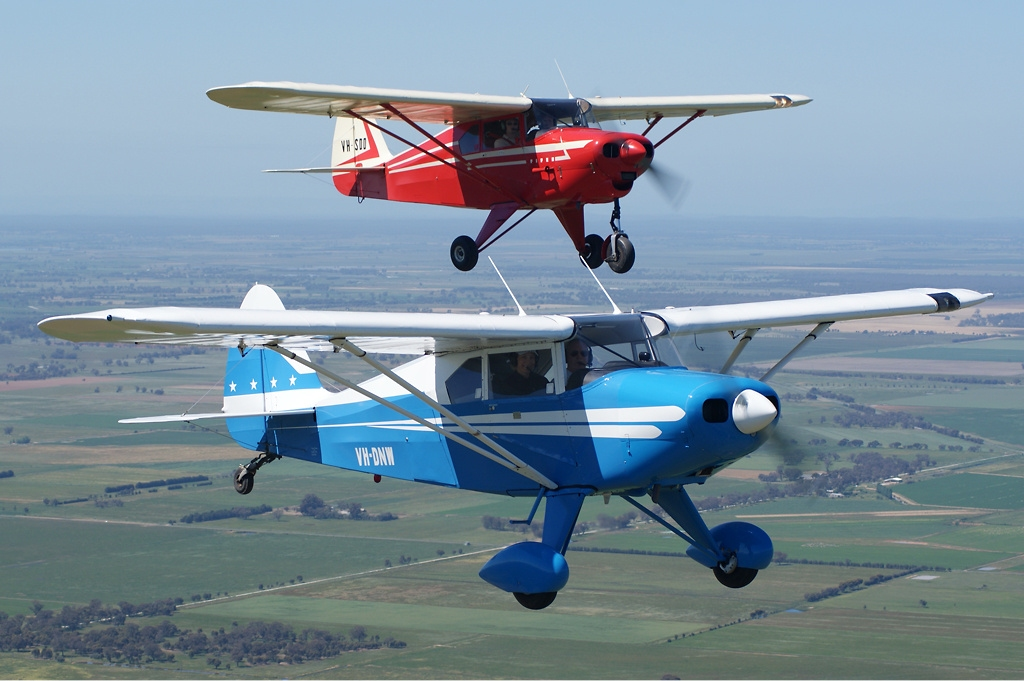
- Piper PA-22-150 Tri-Pacers. The red one is in original configuration, while the blue one has been converted to conventional landing gear

General information
- Type: Civil utility aircraft
- Manufacturer: Piper Aircraft
- Number built: 1,120 (PA-20); 9,490 (PA-22)

History
- Manufactured: 1950–1954 (PA-20); 1950–1964 (PA-22)
- First flight: 1949 (PA-20); 1950 (PA-22)
- Developed from: Piper PA-15 Vagabond
- Variant: Javelin V6 STOL

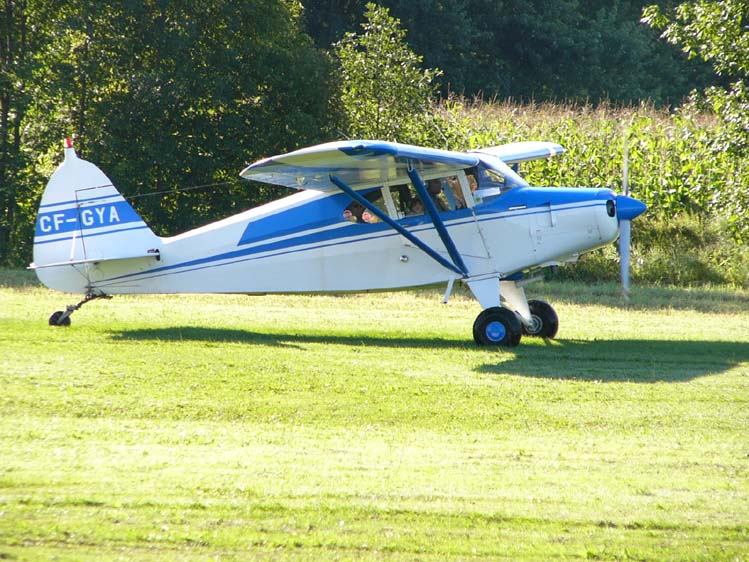
Piper PA-20-115 Pacer

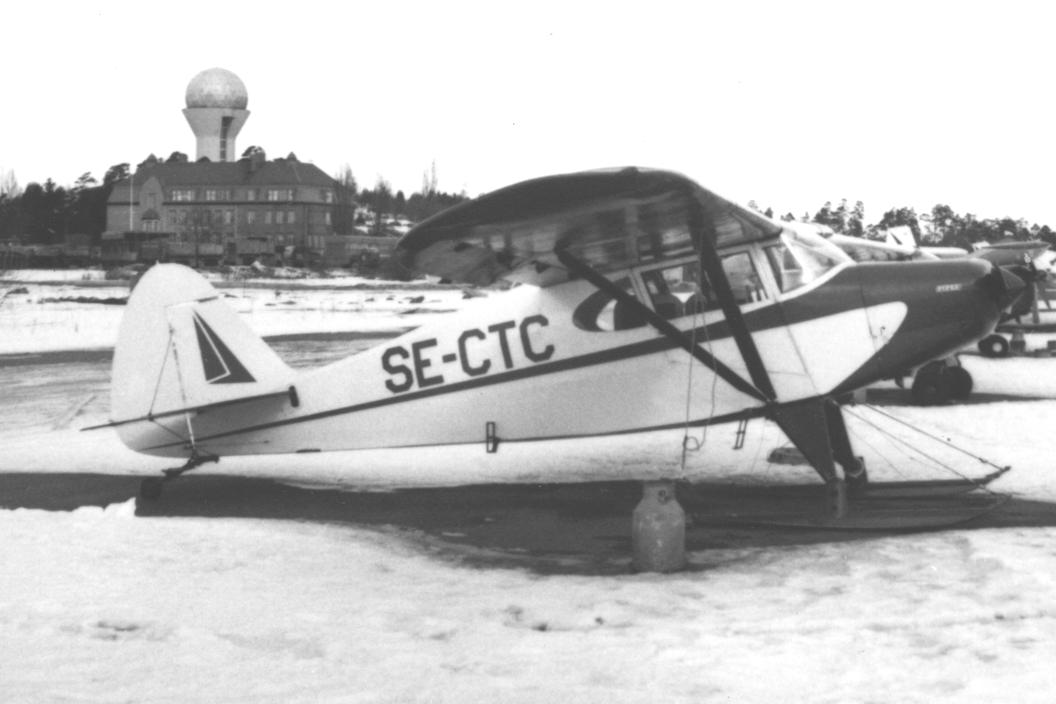
Ski-equipped PA-20 Pacer

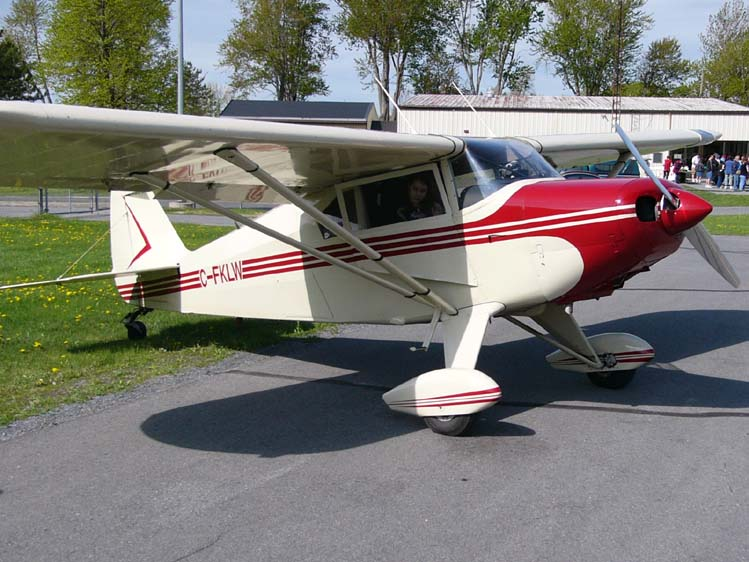
Piper PA-22-150 Tri-Pacer converted to conventional landing gear

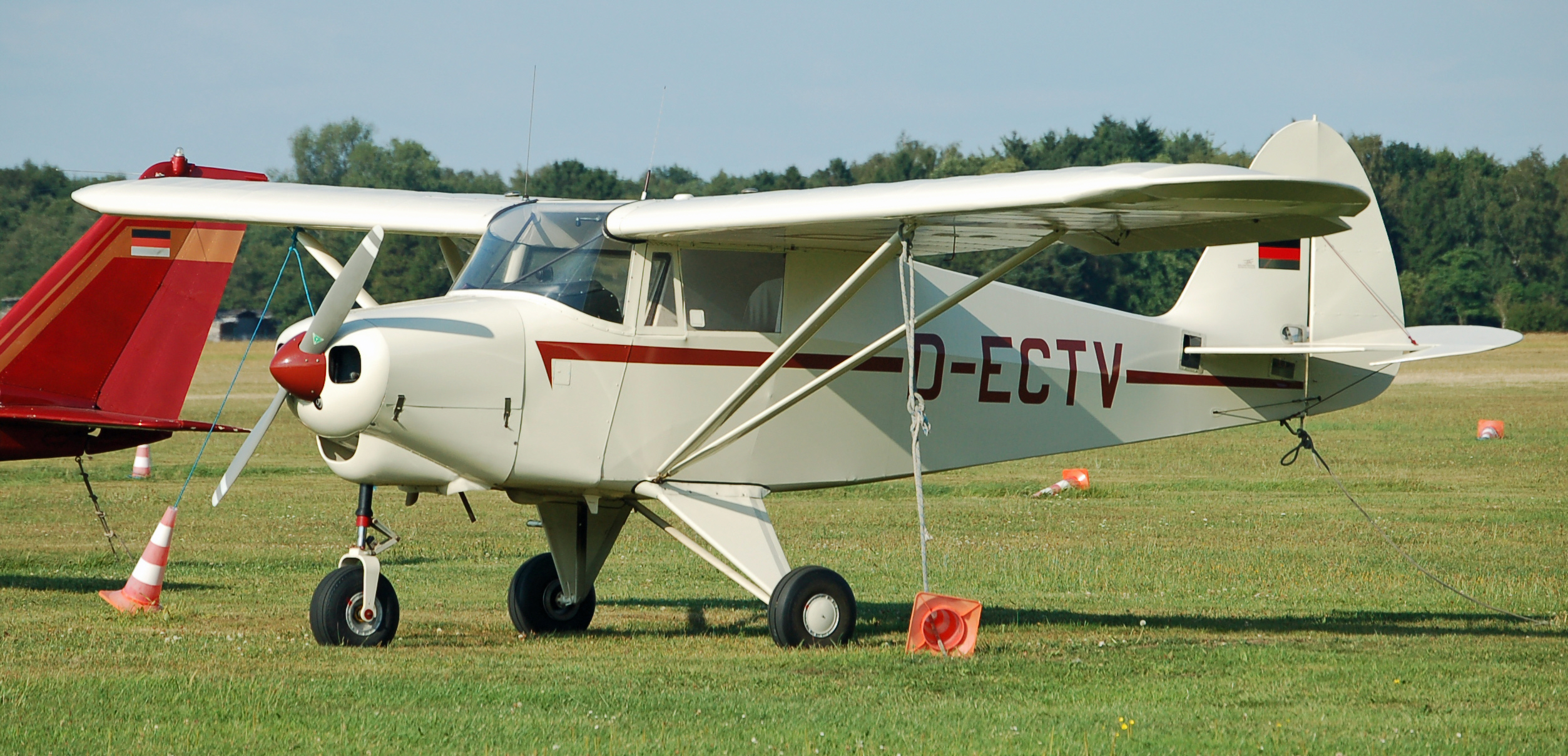
Piper PA-22 Colt

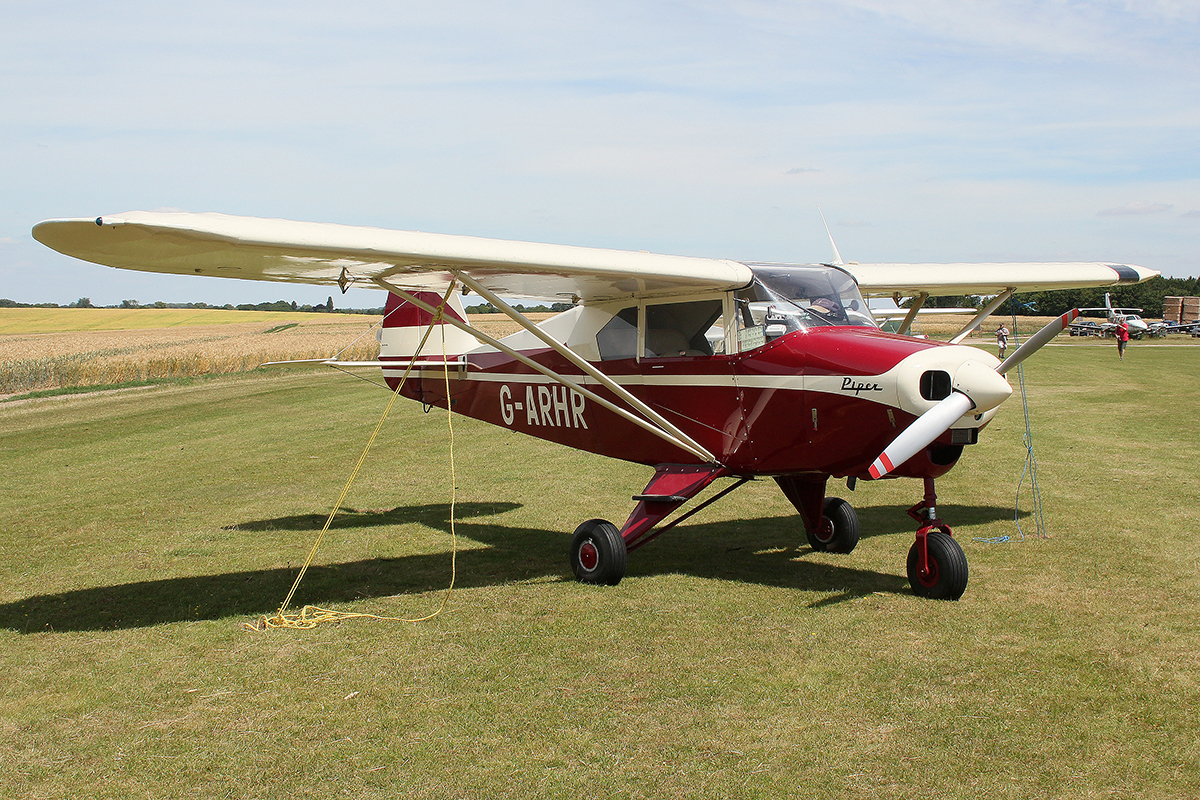
Piper PA-22-150 Caribbean

The PA-20 Pacer and PA-22 Tri-Pacer, Caribbean, and Colt are an American family of light strut-braced high-wing monoplane aircraft built by Piper Aircraft from 1949 to 1964.

The Pacer is essentially a four-place version of the two-place PA-17 Vagabond, with conventional landing gear, a steel tube fuselage and an aluminum frame wing covered with fabric, much like Piper's famous Cub and Super Cub. The Tri-Pacer is a development of the Pacer with tricycle landing gear, while the Colt is a two-seat flight training version of the Tri-Pacer. Prized for their ruggedness, spacious cabins, and, for the time, impressive speed, many of these aircraft continue to fly.

Factory installed 108 hp (81 kW), 125 hp (93 kW), 135 hp (101 kW), 150 hp (110 kW), and 160 hp (120 kW) engine options were available, and 180 hp (130 kW) engine after-market conversions have been offered.

== Development ==
The Pacer and the Tri-Pacer were the first post-World War II Piper designs with flaps and a control yoke instead of a center stick, and they belong to a sub-group of Piper aircraft popularly called "short wing Pipers," reflecting their shorter wingspans compared to the earlier J-3 Cub and PA-18 Super Cub. The PA-20 Pacer is a tailwheel aircraft and thus has somewhat limited forward visibility on the ground and relatively demanding ground-handling characteristics. To help introduce more pilots to easier, safer flying, from February 1951, Piper introduced the PA-22 Tri-Pacer with a nosewheel instead of the tailwheel landing gear. Additionally, the Tri-Pacer offered higher-powered engine options in the form of 150 hp (110 kW) and 160 hp (120 kW), whereas the largest engine available to the original Pacer had an output of 135 hp (101 kW). At that time the tricycle undercarriage became popular and 1953 saw the PA-22 Tri-Pacer outsell the Pacer by six to one. Due to the geometry of the nosewheel, the aircraft is sometimes called the "Flying Milk Stool."

In 1959 and 1960, Piper offered a cheaper, less well-equipped version of the Tri-Pacer with a 150 hp (110 kW) Lycoming O-320 designated the PA-22-150 Caribbean. Over 9400 Tri-Pacers were produced between 1950 and 1964 when production ended, with 3280 still registered with the U.S. Federal Aviation Administration (FAA) in 2018.

An unusual feature of the Tri-Pacer is bungees linking the ailerons and rudder to facilitate coordinated flight. The system can be easily overcome by the pilot as needed and allowed the installation of a simple Mitchell Industries transistorized autopilot marketed by Piper under the name Auto-control. It has roll and yaw data derived from a modified AN5735-1 Direction Indicator and AN5736-1 Gyro Horizon, boosted by a piggyback amplifier on the direction indicator driving a Globe Motors bi-directional motor/servo clamped to the top of the control column via the aileron control chains.

A trainer version of the PA-22 Tri-Pacer, the PA-22-108 Colt, was introduced to compete directly with other popular trainers such as the Cessna 150, and was powered by a 108 hp (81 kW) Lycoming O-235. Quickly designed in late 1960, the two-seat Colt was offered at a substantially lower price than the Tri-Pacer, and omitted the four-seat aircraft's flaps and second wing tank along with the rear side windows and door. The Colt otherwise closely resembles the Tri-Pacer, using the same front seats and door, landing gear, engine mounts, windshield, tail surfaces, struts and instrument panel. Over 2,000 Colts were manufactured and it was the last Pacer variant—and thus the last short wing Piper—to be dropped from production.

The last batch of 12 PA-22-150s were built for the French Army in 1963 and the last of the family, a PA-22-108 Colt, was completed on 26 March 1964. The type was replaced on the Vero Beach production line by the PA-28 Cherokee 140.

Some PA-22s have been converted to a tailwheel configuration, resulting in an aircraft very similar to a PA-20 Pacer, but retaining the refinements and features of the PA-22. These conversions are often referred to by owners as PA-22/20s and are often listed in classified aircraft ads as such, although officially such converted aircraft continue to be designated by the FAA as PA-22 Tri-Pacers. When this conversion is made, disc brakes are usually installed in place of the original drum brakes, and the Lycoming O-360 180 HP engine is the preferred upgrade. Some PA-22s have a Hartzell constant-speed controllable propeller or Koppers Aeromatic propeller. These installations improve performance and economy at the sacrifice of payload. A few Colts have also been converted to tailwheel configuration, although this is not as popular.

== Operational history ==
=== Cuba ===
Between 1953 and 1955, the Cuban Army Air Force (Fuerza Aérea Ejército de Cuba, or FAEC) received 7 PA-20s, 4 PA-22-150s, and 3 PA-22-160s. During the Cuban Revolution, PA-22s had their rear-doors removed and a .30 caliber machine gun installed in its place for use against insurgents, along with hand-dropped grenades. A PA-22 providing ground support for the Cuban Army during the Battle of Guisa is believed to be the lone aircraft lost by the FAEC to enemy fire.

=== France ===
A total of 24 PA-22s were acquired by the French Army, the first delivered in 1956 and the last decommissioned in 1975. A total of 14 were delivered to the Army Light Aviation: 3 with a 160 hp engine (2 of which were delivered in May 1957) and 11 with a 150 hp engine, delivered in February and March 1963. To these must be added 10 aircraft for the Marine Troops, delivered in 1957. They were primarily deployed in West Africa.

They were deployed to Chad from April 1969 against the FROLINAT as part of Operation Limousin in the Chadian Civil War (1965–1979). Six PA-22s were deployed in 1971 by the French Army Light Aviation (ALAT) Squadron of the French Marine Troops to Chad. One Tripacer was destroyed on February 18, 1972, during the fighting at Am Dagachi, resulting in the deaths of the three French soldiers on board.

=== Katanga ===
During the Congo Crisis, Katangese separatists received five PA-22-150s from the South African Air Force for the Force aérienne katangaise which were deployed against ONUC forces between 1961 and 1963.

== Variants ==
PA-20
Four seats, conventional landing gear, 125 hp (93 kW) Lycoming O-290-D engine. Certified 21 December 1949.
PA-20S
Three seats, conventional landing gear, optional float installation, 125 hp (93 kW) Lycoming O-290-D engine. Certified 18 May 1950.
PA-20 115
Four seats, conventional landing gear, 115 hp (86 kW) Lycoming O-235-C1 engine. Certified 22 March 1950.
PA-20S 115
Three-seat, conventional landing gear, optional float installation, 115 hp (86 kW) Lycoming O-235-C1 engine. Certified 18 May 1950.
PA-20 135
Four seats, conventional landing gear, 135 hp (101 kW) Lycoming O-290-D2 engine. Certified 5 May 1952.
PA-20S 135
Three seats, conventional landing gear, optional float installation, 135 hp (101 kW) Lycoming O-290-D2 engine. Certified 15 May 1952.
PA-22
Four seats, tricycle landing gear, 125 hp (93 kW) Lycoming O-290-D engine. Certified 20 December 1950.
PA-22-108 Colt
Two seats, tricycle landing gear, 108 hp (81 kW) Lycoming O-235-C1 or C1B engine. Certified 21 October 1960.
PA-22-135
Four seats, tricycle landing gear, 135 hp (101 kW) Lycoming O-290-D2 engine. Certified 5 May 1952.
PA-22S-135
Three seats, tricycle landing gear, optional float installation, 135 hp (101 kW) Lycoming O-290-D2 engine. Certified 14 May 1954.

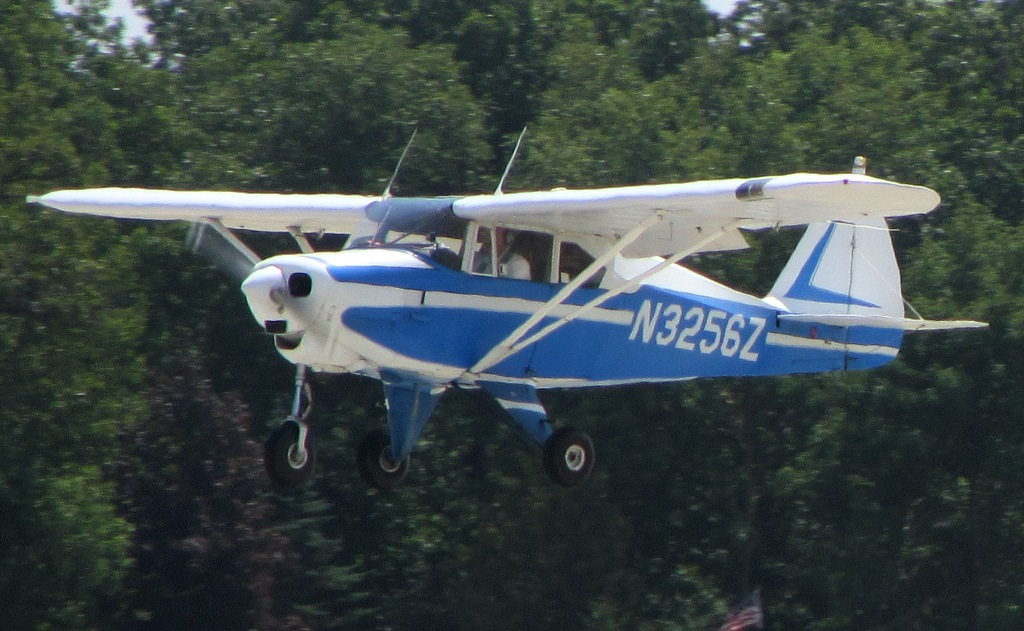
1959 PA-22-150 landing

PA-22-150
Two or four seats, tricycle landing gear, 150 hp (110 kW) Lycoming O-320-A2A or A2B engine. Certified 3 September 1952 as a four place in the normal category and 24 May 1957 as a two place in the utility category.
PA-22-150 Caribbean
The Caribbean model was a 150 hp (110 kW) Lycoming O-320-A2A equipped model that remained in production after the 160 hp (120 kW) was introduced, to differentiate it.
PA-22S-150
Three seats, tricycle landing gear, optional float installation, 150 hp (110 kW) Lycoming O-320-A2A or A2B engine. Certified 3 September 1954.
PA-22-160
Two or four seats, tricycle landing gear, 160 hp (120 kW) Lycoming O-320-B2A or B2B engine. Certified 3 September 1952 as a four place in the normal category and as a two place in the utility category.
PA-22S-160
Three seats, tricycle landing gear, optional float installation, 160 hp (120 kW) Lycoming O-320-B2A or B2B engine. Certified 25 October 1957.

== Specifications (1958 PA-22-160 Tri-Pacer) ==
3-view line drawing of the Piper PA-20 Pacer

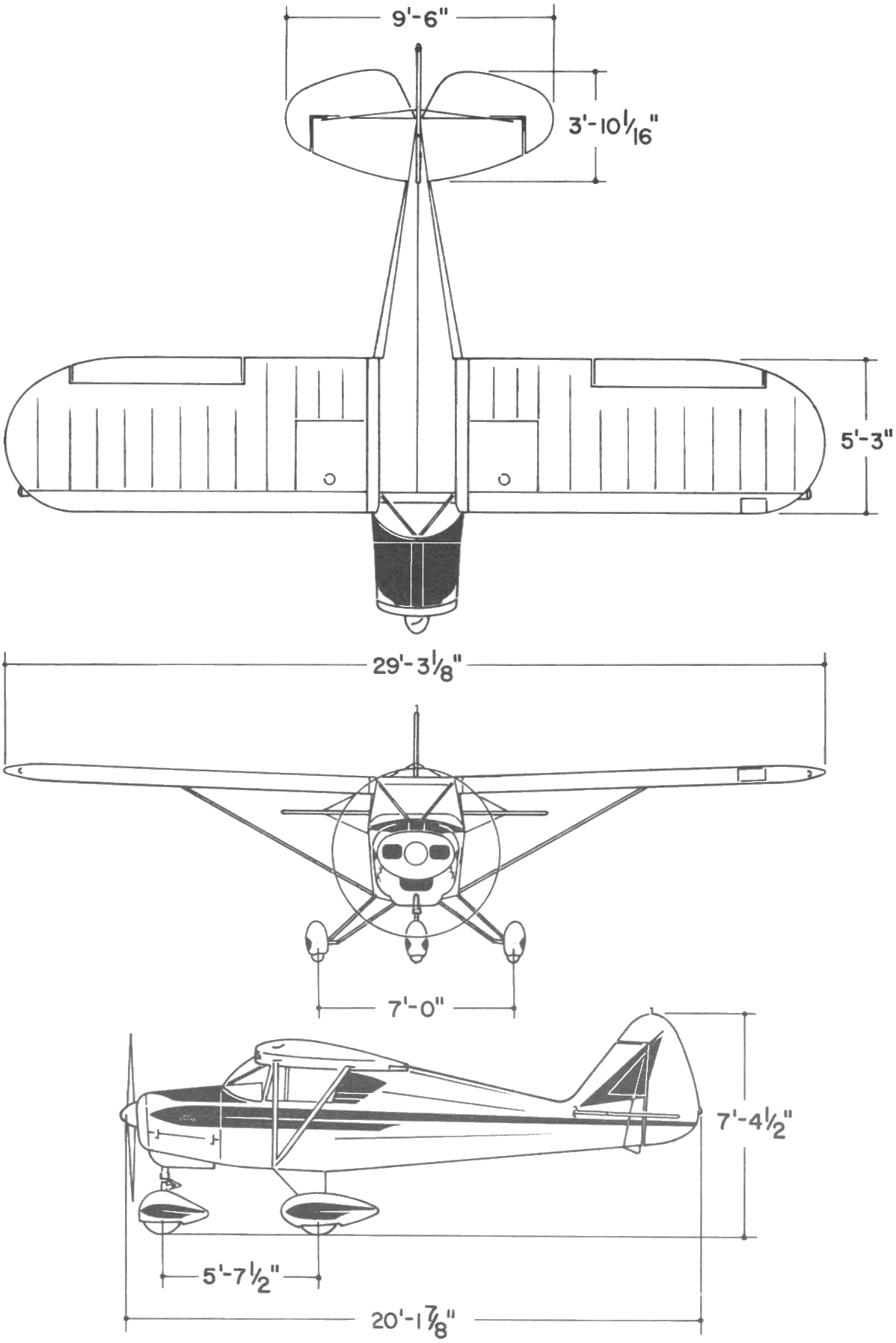
3-view line drawing of the Piper PA-22-108 Colt

Data from Piper PA-22-160 pilot's operating handbook, issued January 1960

General characteristics

- Crew: one
- Capacity: three passengers
- Length: 20 ft 6 in (6.25 m)
- Wingspan: 29 ft 3 in (8.92 m)
- Height: 8 ft 4 in (2.54 m)
- Wing area: 147.5 sq ft (13.70 m^{2})
- Empty weight: 1,110 lb (503 kg)
- Gross weight: 2,000 lb (907 kg)
- Fuel capacity: 36 US gal (140 L; 30 imp gal)
- Powerplant: 1 × Lycoming O-320-B four cylinder, four-stroke, air-cooled, horizontally opposed, piston aircraft engine, 160 hp (120 kW)
- Propellers: 2-bladed metal, fixed pitch

Performance

- Maximum speed: 141 mph (227 km/h, 123 kn)
- Cruise speed: 134 mph (216 km/h, 116 kn) 75% power, 7000ft
- Stall speed: 49 mph (79 km/h, 43 kn)
- Range: 500 mi (800 km, 430 nmi) with reserves, 610 with optional tank
- Endurance: 3:30 at 65% power with one hour reserve
- Service ceiling: 16,500 ft (5,000 m)
- Rate of climb: 800 ft/min (4.1 m/s)
- Wing loading: 13.5 lb/sq ft (66 kg/m^{2})

== See also ==
- 1949 in aviation

Related development

- PA-15/17 Vagabond
- Piper PA-16 Clipper

Aircraft of comparable role, configuration, and era

- Stinson 108
- Cessna 170
- Cessna 172
- Partenavia Fachiro
