= Lycoming O-235 =

Family of four-cylinder, air-cooled, horizontally opposed, piston aircraft engine

O-235
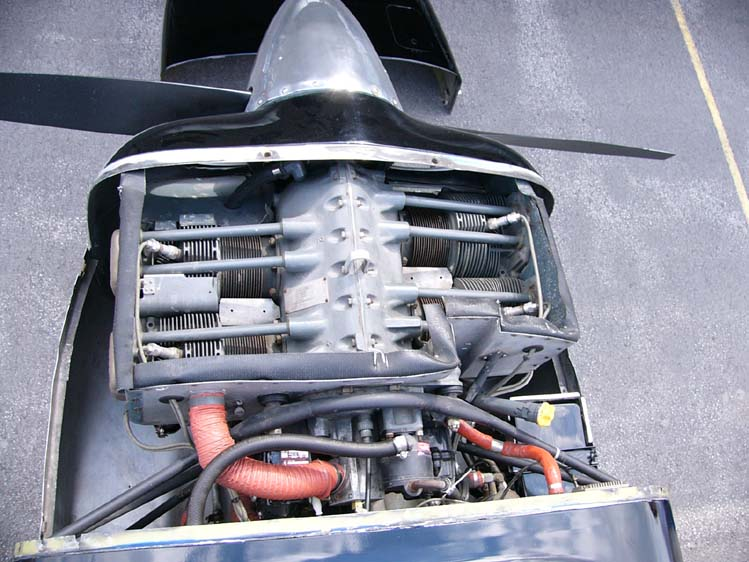
- A Lycoming O-235-C2C engine mounted in an American Aviation AA-1 Yankee light aircraft.
- Type: Certified piston aero-engine
- National origin: United States
- Manufacturer: Lycoming Engines
- First run: 1941
- Major applications: Cessna 152; Piper PA-18 Super Cub; Piper PA-38 Tomahawk; Grumman American AA-1; Beechcraft Skipper
- Manufactured: 1942–present
- Developed from: Lycoming O-233
- Developed into: Lycoming IO-233

The Lycoming O-235 is a family of four-cylinder, air-cooled, horizontally opposed, piston aircraft engines that produce 100 to 135 hp (75 to 101 kW), derived from the earlier O-233 engine.

Well-known designs that use versions of the O-235 included the Cessna 152, Grumman American AA-1 series, Beechcraft Model 77 Skipper, Piper PA-38 Tomahawk, American Champion Citabria, Piper Clipper, and the Piper PA-22-108 Colt.

== Development ==
The engines are all carburetor-equipped, feature dual magneto ignition and have a displacement of 233 cubic inches (3.82 L). The first O-235 model was certified on 11 February 1942.

The O-235 was developed into the lighter-weight Lycoming IO-233 engine for light sport aircraft.

== Variants ==
O-235-C1
Power 115 hp (86 kW) at 2800 rpm, dry weight 246 lb (112 kg) Provision for dual pump drives, tractor and pusher installation.
O-235-C1A
Power 100 hp (75 kW) at 2450 rpm, dry weight 236 lb (107 kg) Similar to O-235-C1 except ignition timing, lower rpm and power. Optional 2 position or automatic propeller governor drive.
O-235-C1B
Power 115 hp (86 kW) at 2800 rpm, dry weight 245 lb (111 kg) Similar to O-235-C1 except with retard breaker magnetos.
O-235-C1C
Power 108 hp (81 kW) at 2600 rpm, dry weight 243 lb (110 kg) Similar to O-235-C1 except with Slick magnetos.
O-235-C2A
Power 115 hp (86 kW) at 2800 rpm, dry weight 246 lb (112 kg) Similar to O-235-C1 except with a type 1 propeller flange.
O-235-C2B
Power 115 hp (86 kW) at 2800 rpm, dry weight 247 lb (112 kg) Similar to O-235-C2A but with two S-1200 series magnetos.
O-235-C2C
Power 108 hp (81 kW) at 2600 rpm, alternate rated maximum continuous power rating of 100 hp at 2400 rpm, dry weight 244 lb (111 kg) Similar to O-235-C2B except with Slick magnetos and shielded ignition harness.
O-235-E1
Power 115 hp (86 kW) at 2800 rpm, dry weight 250 lb (113 kg) Similar to O-235-C1 except crankcase and crankshaft supply pressurized oil to a constant speed propeller. Accessory case changed to accommodate a standard propeller governor drive.
O-235-E1B
Power 115 hp (86 kW) at 2800 rpm, dry weight 249 lb (113 kg) Similar to O-235-E1 except for S4LN-200 series retarded breaker magnetos.
O-235-E2A
Power 115 hp (86 kW) at 2800 rpm, dry weight 250 lb (113 kg) Similar to O-235-E1 except Type 1 propeller flange.
O-235-E2B
Power 115 hp (86 kW) at 2800 rpm, dry weight 251 lb (114 kg) Similar to O-235-E2A except incorporates S-1200 series magnetos.
O-235-F1
Power 125 hp (93 kW) at 2800 rpm, dry weight 250 lb (113 kg) Similar to O-235-C1 except compression ratio, fuel grade and rating.
O-235-F1B
Power 125 hp (93 kW) at 2800 rpm, dry weight 249 lb (113 kg) Similar to O-235-F1 except retarded breaker magnetos.
O-235-F2A
Power 125 hp (93 kW) at 2800 rpm, dry weight 250 lb (113 kg) Similar to O-235-F1 except a Type 1 propeller flange.
O-235-F2B
Power 125 hp (93 kW) at 2800 rpm, dry weight 251 lb (114 kg) Similar to O-235-F2A but with S-1200 series magnetos.
O-235-G1
Power 125 hp (93 kW) at 2800 rpm, dry weight 253 lb (115 kg) Similar to O-235-F1 except provisions for using constant speed propeller.
O-235-G1B
Power 125 hp (93 kW) at 2800 rpm, dry weight 252 lb (114 kg) Similar to O-235-G1 except has retarded breaker magnetos.
O-235-G2A
Power 125 hp (93 kW) at 2800 rpm, dry weight 253 lb (115 kg) Similar to O-235-G1 except a Type 1 propeller flange.
O-235-G2B
Power 125 hp (93 kW) at 2800 rpm, dry weight 254 lb (115 kg) Similar to O-235-G2A except S-1200 series magnetos.
O-235-H2C
Power 108 hp (81 kW) at 2600 rpm, alternate rated maximum continuous power rating of 100 hp at 2400 rpm, dry weight 243 lb (110 kg) Similar to O-235-C2C except Type 1 dynafocal mounting.
O-235-J2A
Power 125 hp (93 kW) at 2800 rpm, dry weight 252 lb (114 kg) Similar to O-235-J2B except magnetos.
O-235-J2B
Power 125 hp (93 kW) at 2800 rpm, dry weight 253 lb (115 kg) Similar to O-235-F2B except Type 1 dynafocal mounting.
O-235-K2A
Power 118 hp (88 kW) at 2800 rpm, dry weight 252 lb (114 kg) Similar to O-235-F2A except ignition timing, lower power and reduced compression ratio.
O-235-K2B
Power 118 hp (88 kW) at 2800 rpm, dry weight 253 lb (115 kg) Similar to O-235-F2B except ignition timing, lower power and reduced compression ratio.
O-235-K2C
Power 115 hp (86 kW) at 2700 rpm, dry weight 248 lb (112 kg) Similar to O-235-K2A except Slick magnetos.
O-235-L2A
Power 118 hp (88 kW) at 2800 rpm, alternate ratings of 115 hp (86 kW) at 2700 rpm, 112 hp (84 kW) at 2600 rpm, 110 hp (82 kW) at 2550 rpm and 105 hp (78 kW) at 2400 rpm, dry weight 252 lb (114 kg) Similar to O-235-J2A except ignition timing, lower power and reduced compression ratio.
O-235-L2C
Power 115 hp (86 kW) at 2700 rpm, alternate ratings of 115 hp (86 kW) at 2700 rpm, 112 hp (84 kW) at 2600 rpm, 110 hp (82 kW) at 2550 rpm and 105 hp (78 kW) at 2400 rpm, dry weight 249 lb (113 kg) Similar to O-235-L2A except Slick magnetos and lower maximum continuous rating.
O-235-M1
Power 118 hp (88 kW) at 2800 rpm, alternate ratings of 115 hp (86 kW) at 2700 rpm, 112 hp (84 kW) at 2600 rpm, 110 hp (82 kW) at 2550 rpm and 105 hp (78 kW) at 2400 rpm, dry weight 255 lb (116 kg) Similar to -L2A except provision for controllable propeller and has AS-127 Type 2 propeller flange.
O-235-M2C
Power 118 hp (88 kW) at 2800 rpm, alternate ratings of 115 hp (86 kW) at 2700 rpm, 112 hp (84 kW) at 2600 rpm, 110 hp (82 kW) at 2550 rpm and 105 hp (78 kW) at 2400 rpm, dry weight 252 lb (114 kg) Similar to O-235-M1 except Slick 4200 series magnetos and Type 1 propeller flange.
O-235-M3C
Power 118 hp (88 kW) at 2800 rpm, alternate ratings of 115 hp (86 kW) at 2700 rpm, 112 hp (84 kW) at 2600 rpm, 110 hp (82 kW) at 2550 rpm and 105 hp (78 kW) at 2400 rpm, dry weight 252 lb (114 kg) Similar to O-235-M1 except Slick 4200 series magnetos.
O-235-N2A
Power 116 hp (87 kW) at 2800 rpm, alternate ratings of 113 hp (84 kW) at 2700 rpm, 110 hp (82 kW) at 2600 rpm, 108 hp (81 kW) at 2550 rpm and 103 hp (77 kW) at 2400 rpm, dry weight 252 lb (114 kg) Similar to O-235-L2A except reduced compression ratio and reduced power ratings.
O-235-N2C
Power 116 hp (87 kW) at 2800 rpm, alternate ratings of 113 hp (84 kW) at 2700 rpm, 110 hp (82 kW) at 2600 rpm, 108 hp (81 kW) at 2550 rpm and 103 hp (77 kW) at 2400 rpm, dry weight 249 lb (113 kg) Similar to O-235-L2C except reduced compression ratio and reduced power ratings.
O-235-P1
Power 116 hp (87 kW) at 2800 rpm, alternate ratings of 113 hp (84 kW) at 2700 rpm, 110 hp (82 kW) at 2600 rpm, 108 hp (81 kW) at 2550 rpm and 103 hp (77 kW) at 2400 rpm, dry weight 255 lb (116 kg) Similar to O-235-M1 except reduced compression ratio and reduced power ratings.
O-235-P2A
Power 116 hp (87 kW) at 2800 rpm, alternate ratings of 113 hp (84 kW) at 2700 rpm, 110 hp (82 kW) at 2600 rpm, 108 hp (81 kW) at 2550 rpm and 103 hp (77 kW) at 2400 rpm, dry weight 255 lb (116 kg) Similar to O-235-P1 except a Type 1 propeller flange.
O-235-P2C
Power 116 hp (87 kW) at 2800 rpm, alternate ratings of 113 hp (84 kW) at 2700 rpm, 110 hp (82 kW) at 2600 rpm, 108 hp (81 kW) at 2550 rpm and 103 hp (77 kW) at 2400 rpm, dry weight 252 lb (114 kg) Similar to O-235-M2 except reduced compression ratio and reduced power ratings.
O-235-P3C
Power 116 hp (87 kW) at 2800 rpm, alternate ratings of 113 hp (84 kW) at 2700 rpm, 110 hp (82 kW) at 2600 rpm, 108 hp (81 kW) at 2550 rpm and 103 hp (77 kW) at 2400 rpm, dry weight 252 lb (114 kg) Similar to O-235-M3C except reduced compression ratio and reduced power ratings.

== Applications ==
- Aero Boero AB-115
- AMD Alarus
- ARV Griffin
- AESL Airtourer
- Beechcraft Model 77 Skipper
- Bushcaddy R-120
- CEA DR-221
- Cessna 152
- Criquet Storch
- Falconar F11 Sporty
- Fisher Celebrity
- Grob G 115
- Grumman American AA-1
- Kelly-D
- Lucas L-6A
- Lucas L-6B
- Lucas L7
- Murphy Elite
- Murphy Rebel
- Nexaer LS1
- Piel Emeraude
- Peña Joker
- Piper PA-12 Super Cruiser
- Piper PA-16 Clipper
- Piper PA-18 Super Cub
- Piper PA-22-108 Colt
- Piper PA-29 Papoose
- Piper PA-38 Tomahawk
- Preceptor STOL King
- Robin DR.221 Dauphin
- Robin R3000
- Rutan Long-EZ
- Socata Rallye 110ST
- Smith Miniplane
- Stern ST 87 Vega
- Storm Sea Storm
- Tri-R KIS TR-1
- Van's Aircraft RV-9
- Varga 2150 Kachina
- W.A.R. Focke-Wulf 190

== Specifications (O-235-C2C) ==
Data from Operator's Manual, Textron Lycoming Aircraft Engines.

=== General characteristics ===
- Type: 4-cylinder, air-cooled, horizontally opposed, piston aircraft engine
- Bore: 4.375 inches (111.1 mm)
- Stroke: 3.875 inches (98.4 mm)
- Displacement: 233.3 in^{3} (3.823 L)
- Dry weight: 240.0 lb (108.9 kg)

=== Components ===
- Valvetrain: Pushrod-actuated valves
- Fuel system: Carburetor
- Fuel type: 80/87 avgas
- Cooling system: Air-cooled

=== Performance ===
- Power output: 100 hp (75 kW) at 2,400 rpm
- Specific power: 0.57 hp/in³ (26.0 kW/L)
- Compression ratio: 6.5:1

== See also ==
Comparable engines

- Franklin O-235

Related lists

- List of aircraft engines
