= Cessna 152 =

Two-seat tricycle gear general aviation airplane

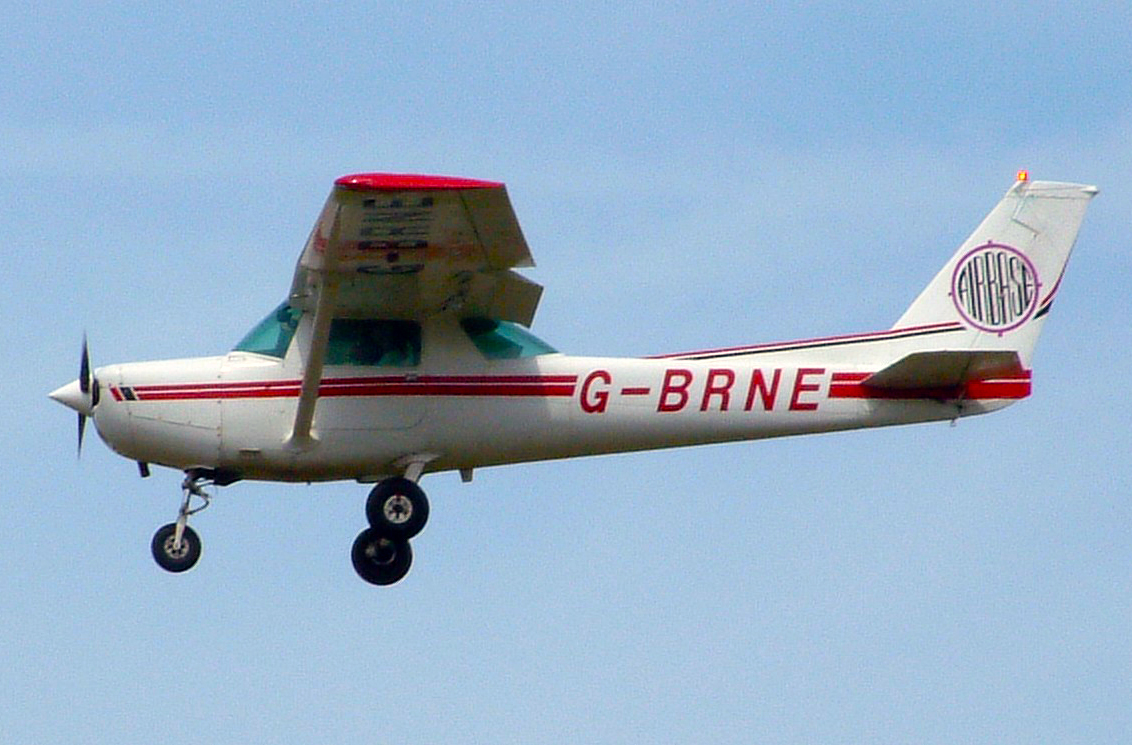

General information
- Type: Basic trainer, GA private aircraft
- National origin: United States
- Manufacturer: Cessna
- Primary users: Mexican Navy Bangladesh Army; Bolivian Air Force
- Number built: 7,584

History
- Manufactured: 1977–1985
- Introduction date: 1977
- Developed from: Cessna 150

The Cessna 152 is an American two-seat, fixed-tricycle-gear, general aviation airplane, used primarily for flight training and personal use. It was based on the earlier Cessna 150 incorporating a number of minor design changes and a slightly more powerful engine with a longer time between overhaul.

The Cessna 152 has been out of production since 1985, but many are still airworthy and are in regular use for flight training.

== Development ==
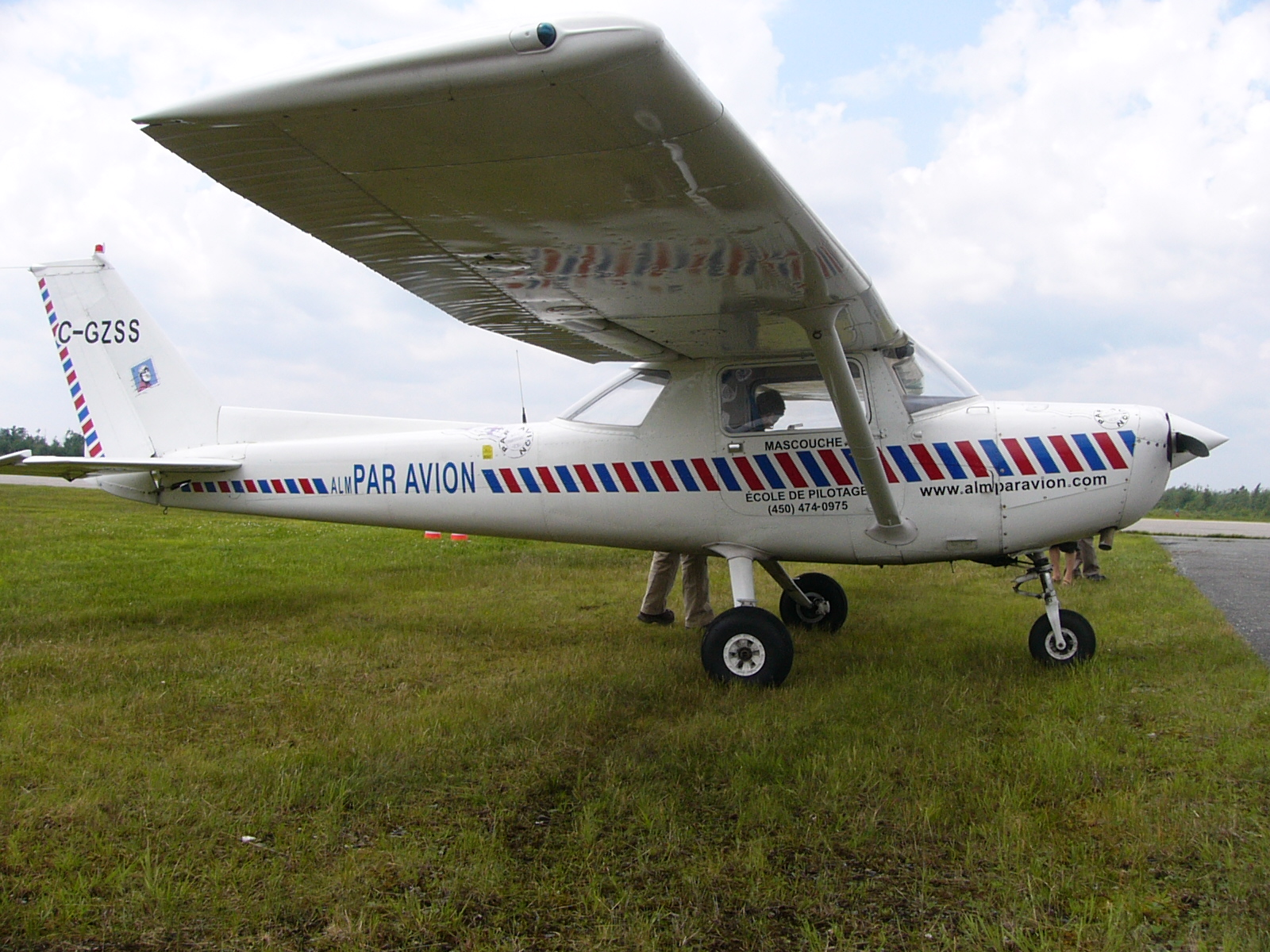
One of the first Cessna 152s produced, a 1978 model year built in 1977

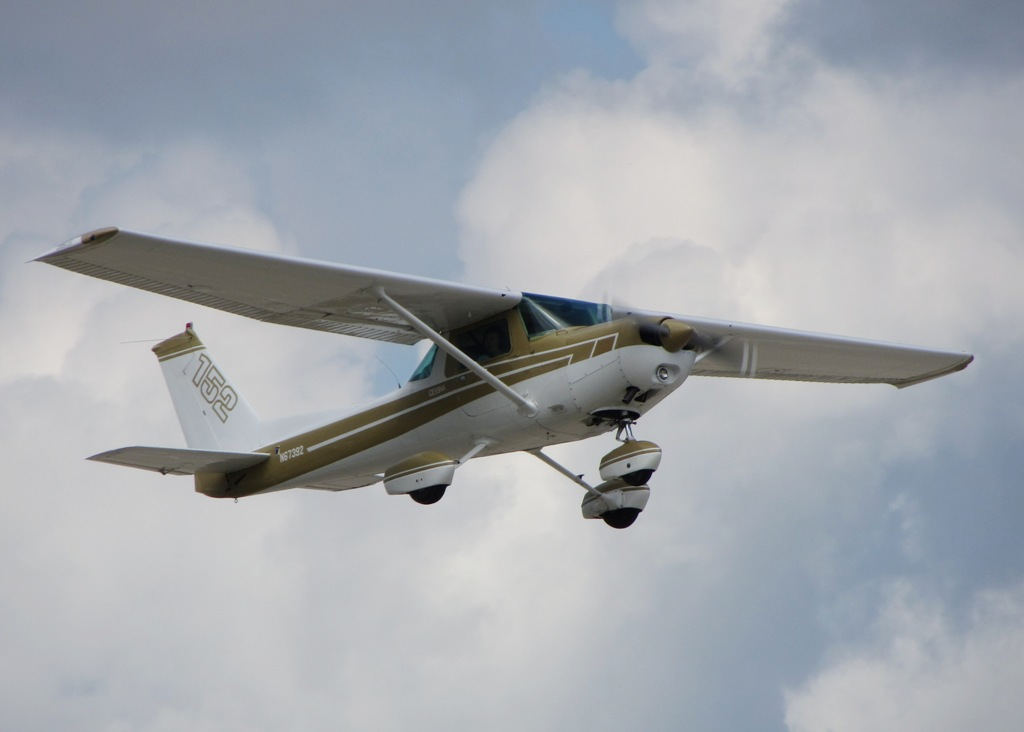
1978 Cessna 152

First delivered in 1977 as the 1978 model year, the 152 was a modernization of the proven Cessna 150 design. The 152 was intended to compete with the new Beechcraft Skipper and Piper Tomahawk, both of which were introduced the same year. Additional design goals were to improve useful load through a gross weight increase to 1,670 lb (760 kg), decrease internal and external noise levels and run better on the then newly introduced Avgas fuel.

As with the 150, the great majority of 152s were built at the Cessna factory in Wichita, Kansas. A number of aircraft were also built by Reims Aviation of France and given the designation F152/FA152.

Production of the 152 was ended in 1985 when Cessna ended production of all of their light aircraft; by that time, a total of 7,584 examples of the 152, including A152 and FA152 Aerobat aerobatic variants, had been built worldwide.

In 1996, the Cessna 152 was certified for operation using 100% ethanol fuel as an alternate to 100LL. This shows that the aircraft is adaptable to alternate and renewable energy sources.

In 2007, Cessna announced that it would build a light-sport successor, designated the Model 162 Skycatcher, although production ended in 2013.

== Design ==
=== Powerplant ===
All Cessna 152s were manufactured with a Lycoming O-235 engine which has been in production since 1942. The Lycoming provided not only an increase in engine power over the Cessna 150, but also was more compatible with the newer 100LL low-lead fuel.

Cessna 152s produced between 1977 and 1982 were equipped with Lycoming O-235-L2C engines producing 110 hp (82 kW) at 2,550 rpm. This engine still suffered some lead-fouling problems in service. In 1983, it was succeeded by the 108 hp (81 kW) O-235-N2C which featured a different piston design and a redesigned combustion chamber to reduce this problem. The N2C engine was used until 152 production ended in 1985.

=== Airframe ===
The airframe is mainly of metal construction, being primarily of 2024-T3 aluminum alloy with riveted skin. Components such as wingtips and fairings are made from glass-reinforced plastic. The fuselage is a semi-monocoque with vertical bulkheads and frames joined by longerons running the length of the fuselage. The wings are of a strut-braced design and have a 1 degree dihedral angle. The tapered (outboard) portion of each wing has one degree of washout (the chord of the tip section has one degree lower angle of attack than the chord at the end of the constant-width section). This allows greater aileron effectiveness during a stall.

The 1978 model has a one piece cowling nose bowl that requires removing the propeller to remove it. The 1979 model introduced a split-nose cowling nose bowl that can be removed without removing the propeller.

=== Flying controls ===
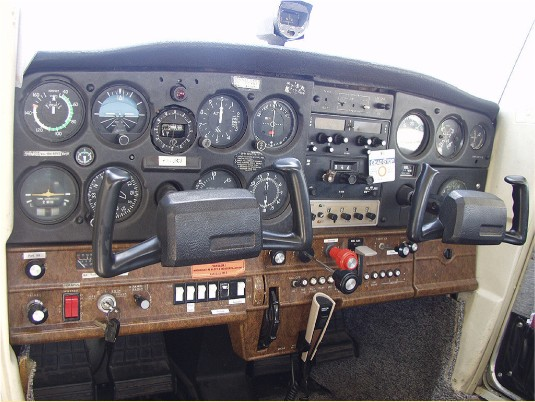
Instrument panel

Dual controls are available as optional equipment on the Cessna 152 and almost all 152s have this option installed.

The Cessna 152 is equipped with differential ailerons that move through 20 degrees upwards and 15 degrees downwards. It has single-slotted fowler flaps which are electrically operated and deploy to a maximum of 30 degrees. The rudder can move 23 degrees to either side and is fitted with a ground-adjustable trim tab. The elevators move up through 25 degrees and down through 18 degrees. An adjustable trim tab is installed on the right elevator and is controlled by a small wheel in the center of the control console. The trim tab moves 10 degrees up and 20 degrees down relative to the elevator chordline.

=== Landing gear ===
The Cessna 152 is equipped with fixed tricycle landing gear. The main gear has tubular steel legs surrounded by a full-length fairing with a step for access to the cabin. The main gear has a 7 ft 7 in (2.31 m) wheelbase.

The nosewheel is connected to the engine mount and has an oleo strut to dampen and absorb normal operating loads. The nosewheel is steerable through 30 degrees either side of neutral and can castor under differential braking up to 30 degrees. It is connected to the rudder pedals through a spring linkage.

The braking system consists of single disc brake assemblies fitted to the main gear and operated by a hydraulic system. Brakes are operated by pushing on the top portion of the rudder pedals. It is possible to use differential braking when taxiing and this allows very tight turns to be made.

The 152 is also fitted with a parking brake system. It is applied by depressing both toe brakes and then pulling the "Park Brake" lever to the pilot's left. The toe brakes are then released but pressure is maintained in the system thereby leaving both brakes engaged.

The standard tires used are 600 X 6 on the main gear and 500 X 5 on the nosewheel.

=== Modifications ===
There are hundreds of modifications available for the Cessna 152. The most frequently installed include:

==== Tailwheel landing gear ====
Taildragger conversions are available and have been fitted to some 152s. It involves strengthening the fuselage for the main gear being moved further forward, removing the nosewheel and strengthening the tail area for the tailwheel. This greatly improves short field performance and is claimed to give up to a 10 kn (19 km/h) cruise speed increase.

==== STOL kits ====
The wings can be modified using a number of STOL modification kits, some improving high speed/cruise performance but most concentrating on STOL performance. Horton's STOL kit is one of the better-known of the latter. It involves fitting a more cambered leading edge cuff to increase the maximum coefficient of lift, fitting fences at the aileron/flap intersection and fitting drooped wingtips. Stalls with these modifications are almost off the airspeed indicator, since instrument error is high at high angles of attack. It has been said that landings can be achieved in two fuselage lengths with the kit installed in addition to a taildragger modification, by balancing power against drag. Takeoff performance is also improved by varying degrees depending on the surface.

==== Engine ====
The engine's power can be increased by various modifications, such as the Sparrow Hawk power package, increasing it to 125 hp (93 kW). The disadvantage of the Sparrow Hawk conversion is that it uses pistons from the O-235-F series engine and therefore the engine recommended time between overhauls is reduced from 2,400 hours to 2,000 hours.

==== Other modifications ====
Other popular modifications include:

- Flap gap seals to reduce drag and increase rate of climb.
- Different wingtips, some of which claim various cruise speed increases and stall speed reductions.
- Auto fuel STCs, which permit the use of automobile fuel instead of the more expensive aviation fuel.
- Auxiliary fuel tanks for greater range.
- Door catches to replace the factory ones that often fail in service.
- Belly fuel drain valves to drain fuel from the lowest point in the fuel system.

== Variants ==
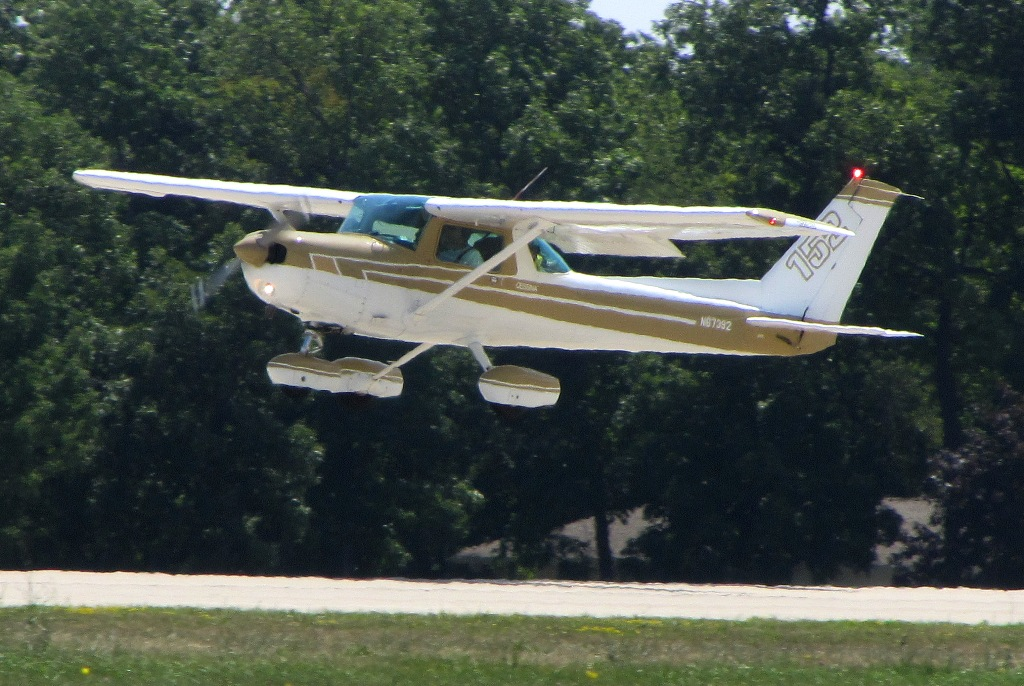
A 1978 Cessna 152 landing

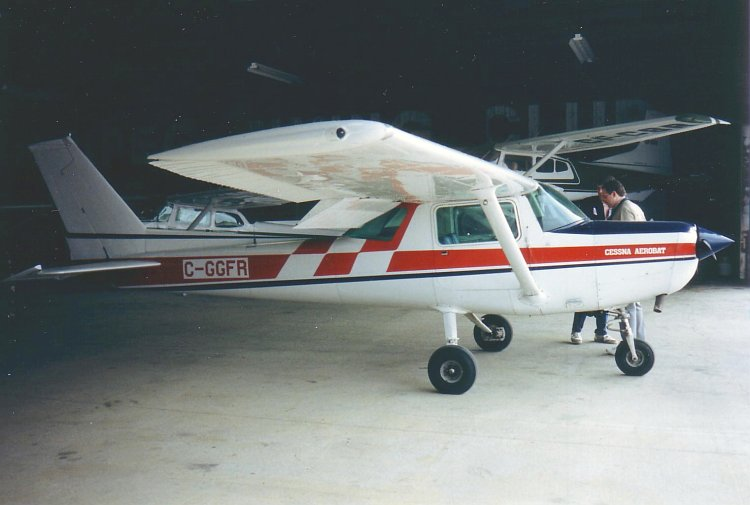
A 1980 A152 Aerobat with its distinctive factory paint scheme

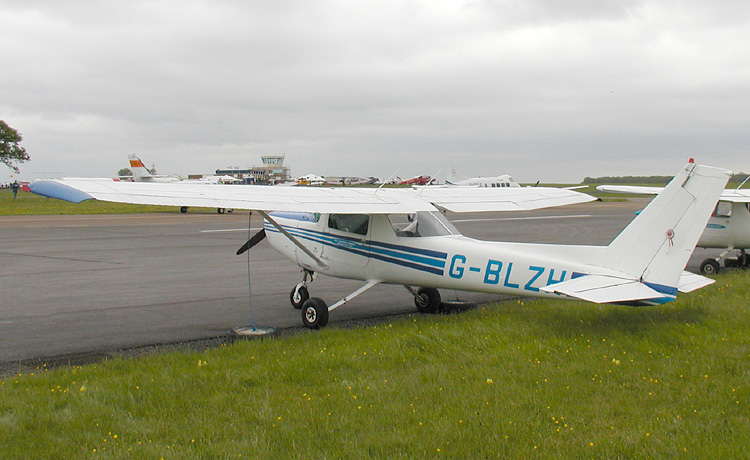
A 1985 Reims-built F152

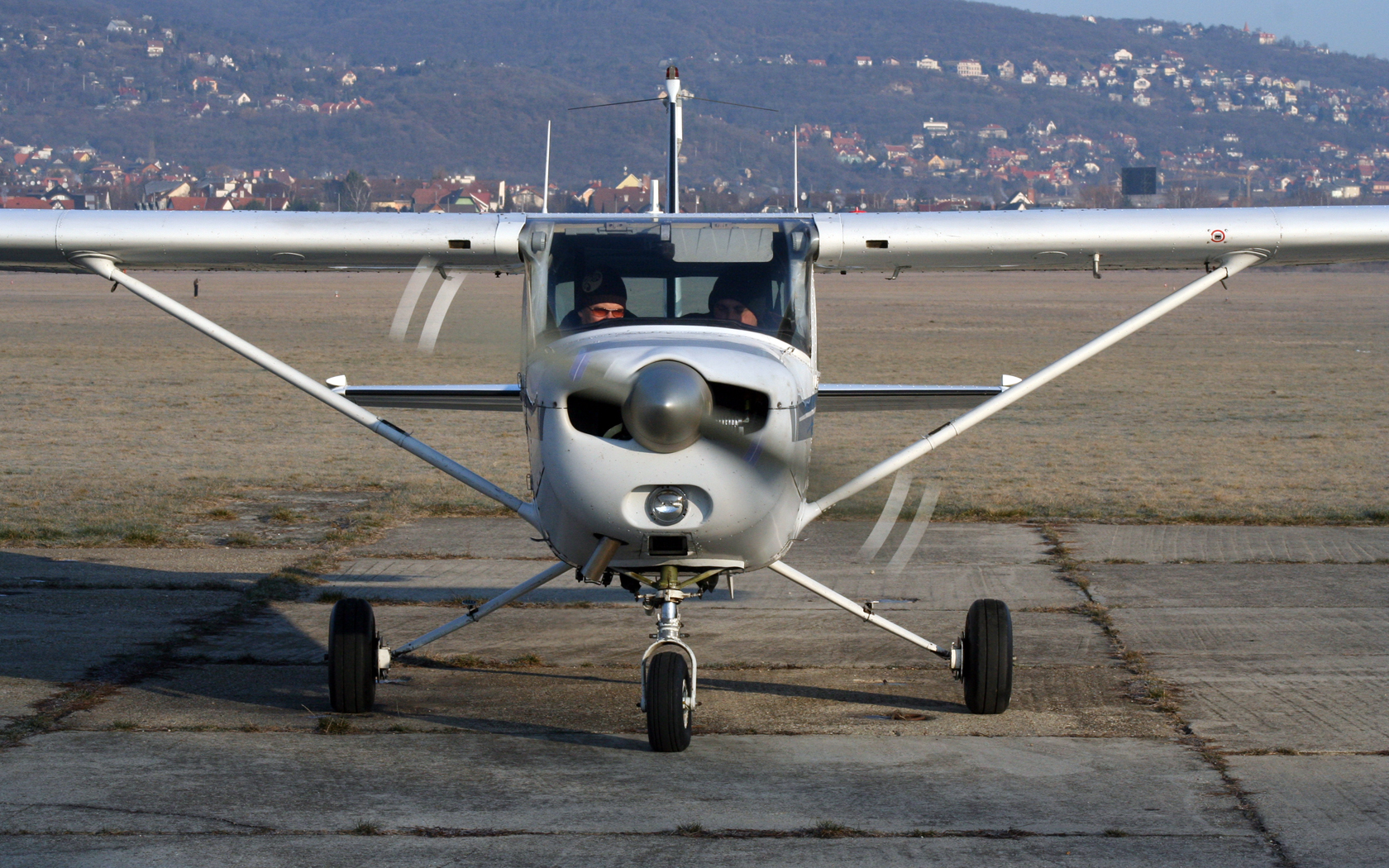
Front view of a Cessna 152

The Cessna 152 has only 4 model variants: 152, F152, A152, FA152 (all equipped with the Lycoming O-235):

152
Two-seat light touring aircraft, fitted with a fixed tricycle landing gear, powered by a 110 hp (82 kW) Lycoming O-235-L2C piston engine, 6628 built. Available with a number of avionic options, aside from the standard Model 152, there was a 152 II with an enhanced package of standard avionics and trim features. Type approved in 1977 and produced as 1978 to 1985 model years.

A152 Aerobat
Two-seat aerobatic-capable aircraft, 315 built. Certified for +6/-3 Gs and had standard four-point harnesses, skylights and jettisonable doors, along with a checkerboard paint scheme and removable seat cushions to allow parachutes to be worn by the crew. Type approved in 1977 and produced as 1978 to 1985 model years. The following aerobatic maneuvers are approved: chandelles, steep turns, barrel rolls, snap rolls, loops, vertical reversements, lazy eights, spins, aileron rolls, Immelmann turns, Cuban eights and stalls (except whip stalls).

F152
Reims-built Model 152, 552 built.

FA152 Aerobat
Reims-built Model A152, 89 built.

C152 II
Not a special model but with Nav Pac equipment package, which included better quality avionics for IFR flying and additional interior equipment, which slightly increases its basic weight.

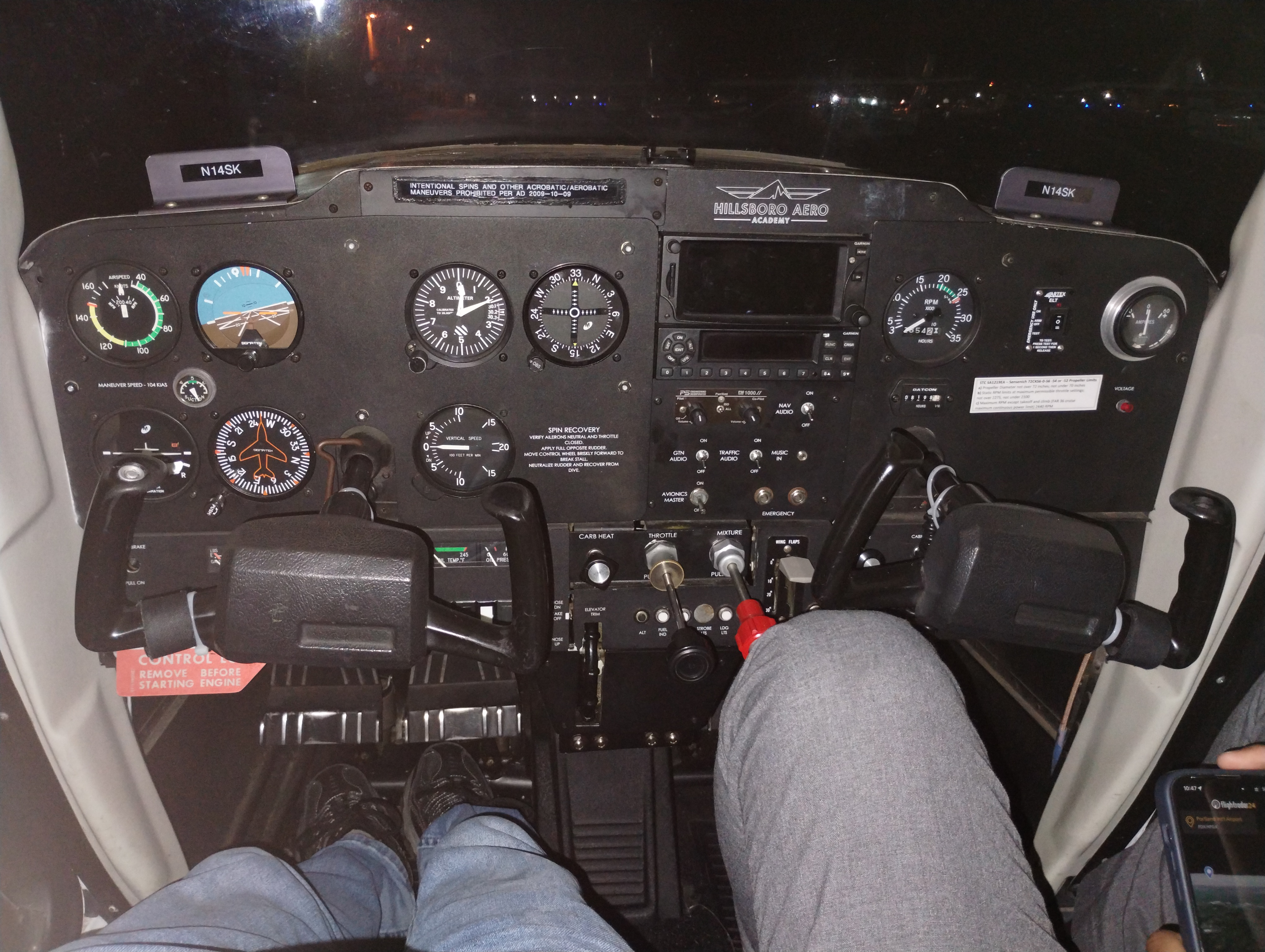
Cockpit of a Cessna 152-T trainer

C152 T
Not a special model but flight school equipment package, with "T" denoting "trainer".

C152 Reimagined
Not a special model but a general overhaul and rebuilt of Cessna 152s by Aviat.:

== Training ==
The Cessna 152 is a commonly used flight trainer for aviation schools around the world. This plane is good for its low operating cost, reliability, and forgiving flight characteristics making it a good option for student training.

== Operators ==
=== Civilian operators ===
The 152 is popular with flight training organizations and is also widely operated by private individuals.

=== Military operators ===
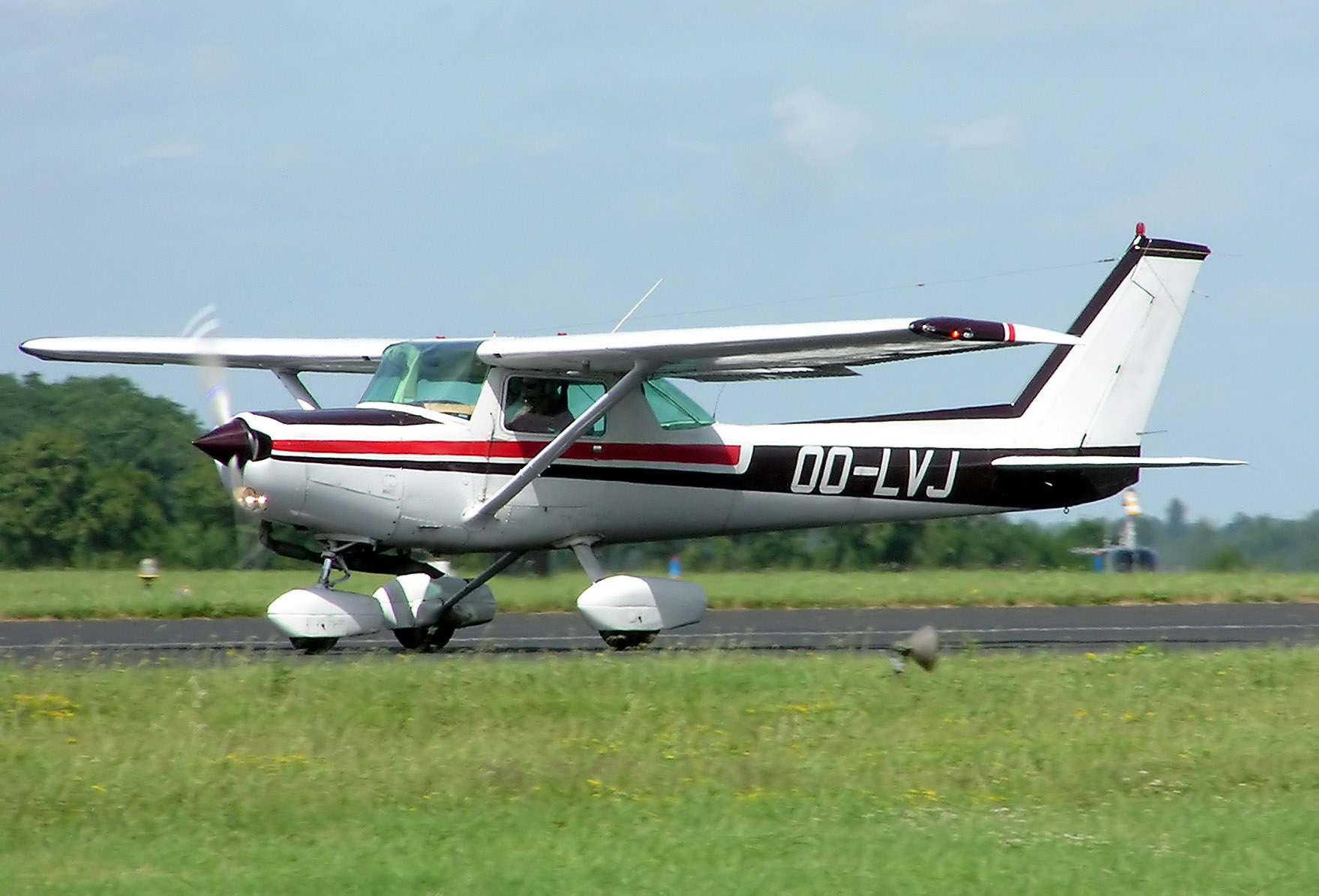
A 1981 Reims-built FA152 Aerobat

Argentina

- Argentine National Gendarmerie operated three from 2004.

Bangladesh

- Bangladesh Army 5 A152 Aerobat

Bolivia

- Bolivian Air Force – 12 in service as of 1987.

Botswana

- Botswana Defence Force Air Wing two A152

Gabon

- Gabonese Air Force one F152

Lesotho

- Lesotho Defence Force one A152

Mexico

- Mexican Navy operated seven from 1979

== Incidents and accidents ==
- On May 9, 1989, a man who had murdered his ex-wife earlier that evening stole a Cessna 152T at gunpoint from an employee at Beverly Municipal Airport. During the flight, which lasted over three hours, Alfred James Hunter III fired a semi-automatic AK-47 rifle at the ground below, buzzed the South Postal Annex in Boston several times, and briefly touched down at Logan International Airport before taking off again. He was arrested when he finally landed with just five minutes' worth of fuel remaining.
- On May 24th, 2001, a Cessna 152 violated Israeli airspace and was shot down by an IAF AH-64 Apache. Estephan Nicolian, a Lebanese student pilot, was shot down after ignoring repeated warnings by Israeli ATC to turn back. This is one of the two only-known operational air-to-air kills using an AGM-114 Hellfire missile.
- On August 1st 2006, during a flight from Cumbernauld Airport to Perth Airport in Scotland a Cessna 152 crashed in the Ochil Hills near Ben Cleuch due to engine issues. The pilot survived unharmed.

== Specifications (Cessna 152) ==
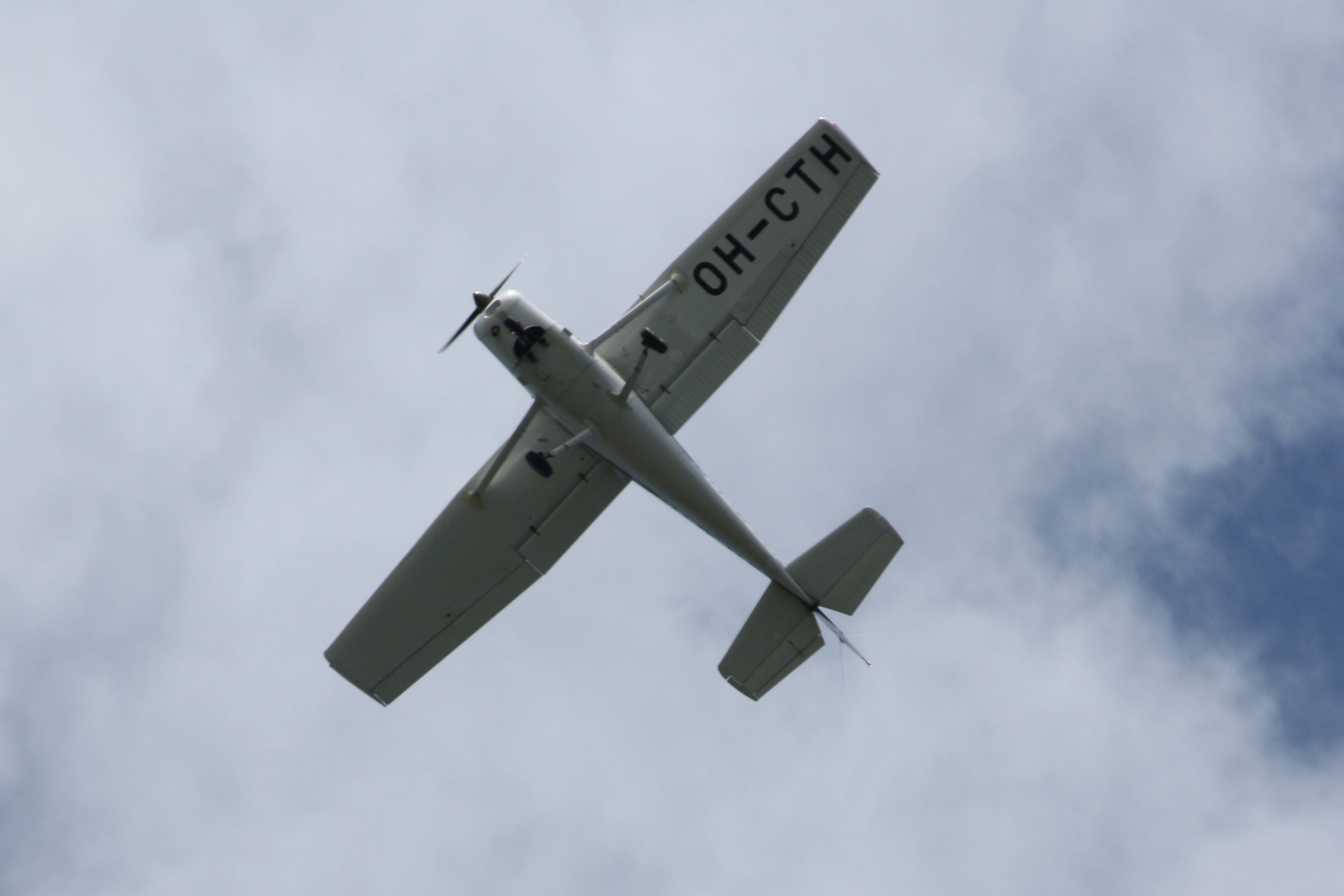
View of the underside of a Cessna 152

Data from Cessna 152 Pilot's Operating Handbook

General characteristics

- Crew: one
- Capacity: one passenger (plus two children not exceeding 120 lb (54 kg) on optional baggage compartment bench seat)
- Length: 24 ft 1 in (7.34 m)
- Wingspan: 33 ft 4 in (10.16 m)
- Height: 8 ft 6 in (2.59 m)
- Wing area: 160 sq ft (15 m^{2})
- Empty weight: 1,081 lb (490 kg)
- Gross weight: 1,670 lb (757 kg)
- Powerplant: 1 × Lycoming O-235-L2C flat-4 engine, 110 hp (82 kW)
- Propellers: 2-bladed fixed pitch, 69 inches (175 cm) McCauley or 72 in (183 cm) Sensenich propeller

Performance

- Maximum speed: 126 mph (203 km/h, 109 kn)
- Cruise speed: 123 mph (198 km/h, 107 kn)
- Stall speed: 49 mph (79 km/h, 43 kn) (power off, flaps down)
- Range: 477 mi (768 km, 415 nmi)
- Ferry range: 795 mi (1,279 km, 691 nmi) with long-range tanks
- Service ceiling: 14,700 ft (4,500 m)
- Rate of climb: 715 ft/min (3.63 m/s)

== See also ==
Related development

- Cessna 140
- Cessna 150
- Cessna 172

Aircraft of comparable role, configuration, and era

- Alpha 2000 (Robin R2000)
- Beechcraft Skipper
- Diamond DA20
- Grumman American AA-1
- Liberty XL2
- Piper PA-38 Tomahawk
- Symphony SA-160

Related lists

- List of aircraft
- List of civil aircraft
- List of most produced aircraft
