= Bede Aircraft =

American aircraft company

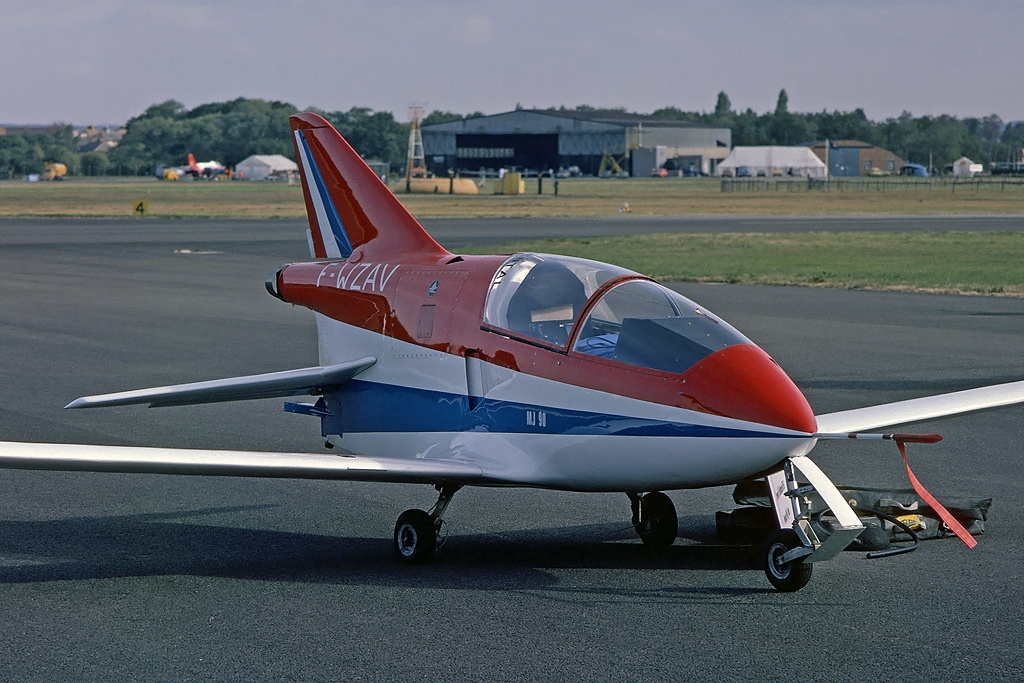
- A BD-5J at Farnborough Airport on 10 September 1976
- Industry: Aerospace
- Founded: 1961
- Founder: Jim Bede

Bede Aircraft Corporation was founded by aeronautical engineer Jim Bede in Cleveland in 1961 to produce the BD-1 kit aircraft, which eventually became the American Aviation Corporation's AA-1. The company also created and produced a number of advanced kit planes including the Bede BD-5 (pusher propeller driven) and BD-5J (turbojet driven). The BD-5J has held the Guinness record as the World's Smallest Jet Aircraft for more than a quarter century. Now surpassed by a jet powered Cri.see Serpentine Airfield Western Australia, CriCri test flight by Sakie. Versions of it saw use in various Budweiser commercials (the Bud Light Jet, which was lost in an inflight fire and crash unrelated to airshow work). The jet also appeared in two James Bond movies; Octopussy starring Sir Roger Moore, and later in a cameo appearance, hanging from the wall of Q's workshop in Die Another Day starring Pierce Brosnan as Agent 007.

A later design, the BD-10 powered by the same engine (GE J-85) used on Lear Jet business jets, claimed to be the first supersonic personal jet built from a kit. Five examples were built in total and three of these crashed. Only two examples remain, both unflyable. The second aircraft was built at the Peregrine Aircraft Company in Minden Nevada. During a flight Test at Douglas County Airport, the aircraft far exceeded the maximum safe flight test speed, and broke up inflight, killing pilot Mike VanWagonen. It was estimated that this aircraft experienced catastrophic vertical stabilizer failure, due to the excess speed during the flight. None of them ever broke the sound barrier. This aircraft was featured on the cover of Aviation Week in June 1994, with a full pilots report.

== Aircraft ==
| Model name | First flight | Number built | Type |
|---|---|---|---|
| Bede BD-1 | 1963 | | |
| Bede BD-2 | 1967 | 1 | |
| Bede XBD-2 | 1961 | 1 | |
| Bede BD-3 | 1965 | | |
| Bede BD-4 | 1968 | | |
| Bede BD-5 | 1971 | | |
| Bede BD-6 | 1974 | | |
| Bede BD-7 | | | |
| Bede BD-8 | 1980 | 1 | |
| Bede BD-10 | 1992 | 5 | |
| Bede BD-12 | | 1 | |
| Bede BD-14 | | 1 | |
| Bede BD-17 Nugget | 2001 | | |
| Bede BD-18 | | | |
| Bede BD-22L | | | |
| Bede Wing | | | Inflatable hang glider |
| Bede HB-1 Super Demoiselle | 1966 | 1 | Ultralight |
