= Chuck Coleman =

American aviator (died 2024)

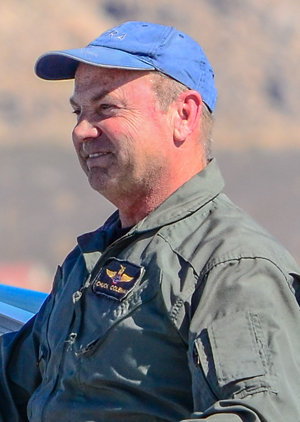
- Coleman in 2019
- Born: 1962 or 1963; Michigan, U.S.
- Died: October 20, 2024 (aged 61); Las Cruces, New Mexico, U.S.
- Education: University of Michigan
- Occupations: Pilot; test pilot; aerospace engineer
- Website: ctcoleman.com

Charles Thomas Coleman (1962 or 1963 – October 20, 2024) was an American aviator, aerospace engineer and airshow & test pilot. He worked as a design and performance engineer for several aircraft corporations such as McDonnell Aircraft Corporation, Bede Jet Corporation and Scaled Composites. Coleman was a member of the Society of Experimental Test Pilots SETP as an Associate Fellow, and served on the board of directors for the Mojave Air and Space Port. As a commercial, test, and instructor pilot, he logged more than 10,800 hours of flight time.

== Early life and education ==
Coleman was raised in St. Johns, Michigan, by Thomas Coleman and JoAnn (Benedict) Smith. He graduated from the University of Michigan in 1985 with a Bachelor's of Science in Aerospace/Mechanical Engineering.

== Career ==
Coleman was a design engineer for 6 years at McDonnell Aircraft Corporation in St. Louis, Missouri. He was involved in military jet projects including serving as the Senior Design Engineer on the High Alpha Research Vehicle, a modified F/A-18 Hornet, utilized by NASA to investigate controlled flight at high angles of attack by way of thrust vectoring.

Coleman also served as a Senior Engineer on the F/A-18 conversion from combat-ready aircraft into performance planes for the United States Navy Blue Angels flight demonstration squadron.

He was a project engineer at the Bede Jet Corporation in Chesterfield, Missouri at the Spirit of St. Louis Airport. He served as the test pilot on the BD-10, a kit-built experimental jet aircraft, and BD-12, a two-seat experimental plane with a pusher configuration.

Coleman joined Scaled Composites in Mojave, California as a performance engineer, test pilot, and chase pilot in 2002. He was on a team of five engineers that designed, constructed, and flight tested the Virgin Atlantic GlobalFlyer, which was the first jet powered aircraft to fly around the world non-stop un-refueled.

Coleman was also a test pilot for the Proteus high altitude jet and tested the Tier One Navigation System for SpaceShipOne, as well as conducting high-G astronaut training for SpaceShipOne astronauts and serving as chase pilot for SpaceShipOne flights. Coleman also served as a test pilot for the ICON A5, an American amphibious light-sport aircraft.

== Performance ==
Coleman performed at numerous airshows and flew aerobatic planes for Patty Wagstaff, Gene Soucy, Ian Groom, Tim Weber, Sean D. Tucker, Discovery Channel, Toyota Airsports, and Paramount Pictures. In 2018, Coleman trained the lead actors starring in Top Gun: Maverick featuring Tom Cruise, Val Kilmer, and Jennifer Connelly. Coleman conducted 140 G tolerance training flights in an Extra EA-300 with actors Glen Powell, Miles Teller, Monica Barbaro, Jay Ellis, Lewis Pullman, and Danny Ramirez, in a flight training regime designed by Cruise. These aerobatic flights were conducted in order to prepare the actors for flight in F/A-18F Super Hornets during actual filming.

== Death ==
On October 20, 2024, Coleman died in a crash during the Las Cruces Air & Space Expo at Las Cruces International Airport. He was 61 years old. The crash occurred around 2:30 pm. Coleman was performing aerobatics when his Extra EA-300 plane crashed half a mile west of the airport.

== Awards ==
Coleman won two Collier Trophies for his involvement in the development of the McDonnell Douglas C-17 Globemaster (1994) and Scaled Composites’ SpaceShipOne (2004). Coleman was also part of the Scaled Composites team that won the Ansari X Prize, a space competition in which the X Prize Foundation offered a cash prize for the first non-government organization to launch a reusable crewed spacecraft into space twice within two weeks.
