= Mumaw =

Mumaw is a surname. Notable people with the surname include:

- Barton Mumaw (1912–2001), American dancer and choreographer
- Katrina Mumaw (born c. 1983), United States Air Force officer

== See also ==
- Mumaw Chapel
