= Bede BD-7 =

BD-7

General information
- Type: Utility aircraft
- Designer: Jim Bede
- Status: Abandoned project
- Number built: 1

The Bede BD-7 was a light aircraft constructed in the United States in 1976. It shared the Bede BD-5's pusher propeller configuration but was considerably larger. The fuselage was all-metal, and the wings used the unique "panel-rib" wing construction pioneered on the Bede BD-4. Some sources state that the prototype (registration N7BD) flew in December 1976, but most suggest that it was never actually completed, much less flown.

== Specifications (prototype) ==
General characteristics

- Crew: one (pilot)
- Capacity: three passengers
- Length: 20 ft 6 in (6.25 m)
- Wingspan: 24 ft (7.3 m)
- Height: 7 ft 6 in (2.29 m)
- Wing area: 94 sq ft (8.7 m^{2})
- Powerplant: 1 × Lycoming IO-360 horizontally-opposed piston engine, 200 hp (150 kW)

Performance

- Maximum speed: 200 mph (320 km/h, 170 kn)
- Range: 1,000 mi (1,600 km, 870 nmi)

== See also ==
Related development

- Bede BD-5
