= Bede BD-6 =

BD-6

General information
- Type: Sports plane
- Manufacturer: Bedecorp for homebuilt aircraft
- Designer: Jim Bede
- Number built: 2

History
- First flight: 1974

The Bede BD-6 is a single-seat light aircraft first flown in the United States in 1974. Similar in design to the Bede BD-4, it is a high-wing cantilever monoplane of conventional configuration. The BD-6 is marketed as a kit homebuilt.

The prototype was damaged in St Louis in the Great Flood of 1993, but in 2005 was reportedly under restoration by Bedecorp. The company created new drawings to finally bring the design to market. By 2011 kits were for sale for US$13,000 and two aircraft had been flown.

The aircraft's recommended engine power range is 50 to 80 hp (37 to 60 kW) and standard engines used include the 60 hp (45 kW) HKS 700E four-stroke powerplant.

== Specifications (prototype) ==
Data from Jane's All the World's Aircraft 1976–77

General characteristics

- Crew: one
- Length: 16 ft 9 in (5.11 m)
- Wingspan: 21 ft 6 in (6.55 m)
- Height: 6 ft 6 in (1.98 m)
- Wing area: 55.5 sq ft (5.16 m^{2})
- Empty weight: 375 lb (170 kg)
- Gross weight: 650 lb (295 kg)
- Powerplant: 1 × HKS 700E , 60 hp (45 kW)

Performance

- Maximum speed: 140 mph (225 km/h, 120 kn)
- Cruise speed: 135 mph (217 km/h, 117 kn)
- Range: 800 mi (1,287 km, 700 nmi)
- Service ceiling: 14,000 ft (4,265 m)
- Rate of climb: 900 ft/min (4.6 m/s)
