= Bede BD-3 =

American prototype aircraft

BD-3

General information
- Type: Homebuilt aircraft
- National origin: United States
- Manufacturer: Bede Corporation
- Designer: Jim Bede
- Status: Prototype only

History
- First flight: 1965

The Bede BD-3 is a prototype six passenger homebuilt aircraft.

== Design and development ==
The BD-3 is a six place, low wing pusher configuration aircraft with tricycle landing gear. The aircraft is powered by two engines driving a single shrouded pusher propeller connected with V belts and overriding clutches. The aircraft uses STOL Boundary layer control devices. The fuselage was built using aluminum honeycomb. Bede intended to scale up a turboprop variant for 15 and 24 passengers. The BD-3 prototype was sold to the EAA AirVenture Museum, although by 2013 it did not appear on the museum's list of aircraft owned.

== Variants ==
Bede XBD-2
Flying prototype - Twin Continental O-300
BD-3
Production model

== Specifications (BD-3) ==
Data from Air Progress, Flying

General characteristics

- Crew: 1
- Capacity: 5 passengers
- Length: 30 ft 8 in (9.35 m)
- Wingspan: 38 ft 5 in (11.71 m)
- Height: 12 ft 4 in (3.76 m)
- Wing area: 192 sq ft (17.8 m^{2})
- Gross weight: 4,300 lb (1,950 kg)
- Fuel capacity: 116 U.S. gallons (440 L; 97 imp gal)
- Powerplant: 2 × Lycoming IO-540-B1A-5 horizontally opposed piston aircraft engine, 290 hp (220 kW) each
- Propellers: 3-bladed Hartzell - Aluminum

Performance

- Cruise speed: 260 kn (300 mph, 480 km/h)
- Stall speed: 36 kn (42 mph, 68 km/h)
- Range: 1,100 nmi (1,270 mi, 2,040 km)
- Service ceiling: 28,000 ft (8,500 m)

== See also ==
- Bede BD-4
