= BD-12 =

BD-12 may refer to:

- Bede BD-12, an American aircraft design
- Chuadanga District, a Western district of Bangladesh
