= BD-14 =

BD-14 may refer to:

- Bede BD-14, an American homebuilt aircraft design
- Dinajpur District, Bangladesh, a district in Northern Rangpur, Bangladesh
- The Bangladeshi variant of the Type 67 machine gun
