= Bede BD-2 =

General information
- Type: Experimental powered sailplane
- National origin: United States
- Manufacturer: Bede Aircraft
- Designer: Jim Bede
- Number built: 1

History
- First flight: March 12, 1967
- Developed from: Schweizer SGS 2-32

The Bede BD-2 was an American experimental powered sailplane designed by Jim Bede to attempt an unrefuelled round-the-world flight.

== Development ==
The BD-2 was a modified Schweizer SGS 2-32 fitted with a specially modified Continental IO-360-C engine. The BD-2 could carry 565 US gallons (2138 litres) of fuel in wing and fuselage tanks, and the modified engine produced only 30 hp (22.4 kW) during the cruise part of the flight.

The BD-2 made its first flight from Wichita on March 12, 1967. Between November 7 and 10, 1969, the aircraft set a world closed-circuit flight distance record for piston-engined aircraft, in which it covered 8,973.38 miles (14,441.26 km) in 70 hours 15 minutes. The flight had to be stopped following a complete electrical failure, and no further record flights were attempted by Bede.

The BD-2 was modified by Javelin Aircraft of Wichita as the Phoenix, which was used by Jerry Mullens to set a new closed-circuit record for piston aircraft on December 5–8, 1981 of 10,070 mi (16207 km) in 73 h 2 min, which was also the longest non-refueled flight made by a solo pilot at the time.

== Specifications (Phoenix) ==
Data from Jane's All The World's Aircraft 1982–83

General characteristics

- Crew: one
- Length: 27 ft 7 in (8.41 m)
- Wingspan: 63 ft 0 in (19.20 m)
- Wing area: 192 sq ft (17.8 m^{2})
- Aspect ratio: 20.7:1
- Empty weight: 1,725 lb (782 kg)
- Max takeoff weight: 5,600 lb (2,540 kg)
- Powerplant: 1 × Continental IO-360C air-cooled six-cylinder, 230 hp (170 kW)

Performance

- Cruise speed: 156 mph (251 km/h, 136 kn) at max takeoff weight, 108 mph (94 kn, 174 km/h) at 2,200 lb (998 kg)
- Stall speed: 62 mph (100 km/h, 54 kn) at 1,900 lb
- Never exceed speed: 194 mph (312 km/h, 169 kn)
- Range: 20,500 mi (33,000 km, 17,800 nmi) estimated, still air
- Endurance: 120 hr (estimated)
- Rate of climb: 1,500 ft/min (7.6 m/s) observed/ max takeoff weight

== See also ==
Aircraft of comparable role, configuration, and era

- Quickie Free Enterprise
- Rutan Voyager
- Virgin Atlantic GlobalFlyer
