= Bede Wing =

General information
- Type: Inflatable hang glider
- Manufacturer: Bede Aircraft
- Designer: Jim Bede

The Bede Wing was an inflated hang glider, designed in the 1970s by aeronautical engineer Jim Bede. Intended as a safer alternative to conventional hang gliders, it resembled an early ram-air parachute, but instead was an inflatable structure, that could be filled with air for gliding, or with helium to act as a gas balloon.

The aspect ratio of the Bede Wing was low, in the area of 1.8. Fitted with unusually long suspension lines, the Bede Wing had almost no dihedral. It was also reported to have a lower sink rate than conventional hang gliders of the time.

Although Bede intended to start full production of the Bede Wing, the project came to nothing. However, it foreshadowed the introduction of ram-air inflated paragliders in the mid-1980s.

== See also ==
- Powered parachute
