= Joshua Memorial Park =

Cemetery in Los Angeles County, California

Coordinates: 34°41′45″N 118°06′54″W

Joshua Memorial Park and Mortuary is a cemetery and mortuary in Lancaster, California. It is a popular location for the burials of notable local figures of the Antelope Valley. It is owned by Service Corporation International.

== Notable interments ==
- Paul Baxley (1923–2011) – Actor
- Raymond Hatton (1887–1971) – Actor
- George Hummel (1887–1965) – Businessman
- John B. McKay (1922–1975) – Astronaut
- Bruce Peterson (1933–2006) – Test Pilot, basis for "The Six Million Dollar Man"
- John Quade (1938–2009) – Actor
- Milton Orville Thompson (1926–1993) – Test pilot
- Joseph A. Walker (1921–1966) – Test pilot and astronaut
- Clarence White (1944–1973) – Bluegrass musician
