= Bede XBD-2 =

XBD-2

General information
- Type: Experimental aircraft
- National origin: United States
- Manufacturer: Bede Aircraft
- Number built: 1

History
- First flight: 26 July 1961
- Developed into: Bede BD-3

The Bede XBD-2 was an experimental short takeoff and landing (STOL) aircraft, with several novel features such as structural use of glass-fibre and aluminium honeycomb, a suction boundary layer control (BLC) system and fuselage-mounted twin engines driving a pusher configuration, shrouded single propeller. The sole example flew in the early 1960s in the United States.

== Design and development ==
Bede aircraft was formed to develop an STOL aircraft of novel construction, incorporating boundary layer control. They placed the design study with the Department of Aerodynamics at the University of Maryland. The boundary layer was controlled with a suction system via 160,0000 upper wing and aileron surface holes, with diameters ranging from 0.020 to 0.029 in (0.51 - 0.74 mm). Aluminium honeycombs were used throughout the fuselage as structural elements. The XBD-2 was powered by a pair of flat-six piston engines mounted inside the fuselage, driving a single pusher configuration propeller, turning within a circular shroud.

The wing of the XBD-2 had an aspect ratio of 9 and 5° of dihedral. It was built around an aluminium box spar, was aluminium skinned and carried sealed all-metal ailerons. A 14 in (356 mm) Joy blower pulled air through the pinholes in the surfaces, venting it in the fuselage to cool the engines. Sealed flaps smoothly changed the wing camber and increased its area by about 15% when extended.

Apart from its use of aluminium honeycomb, the front part of the flat-sided fuselage was conventional, with a cabin with space to seat four, though mostly filled with instrumentation. Aft, two 145 hp (108 kW) Continental O-300 engines were mounted one above the other. They drove the rear propeller shaft through ten V-belts via Sprag clutches to avoid engine speed synchronisation problems. The rear fuselage tapered to a vertical wedge with the propeller shaft emerging at its top. The circular shroud was attached to the fuselage by the fixed triangular fin mounted on the top of the fuselage, the triangular tailplane and a short boom at the bottom. The propeller rotated close to the shroud's leading edge; the shroud was intended partly to reduce propeller tip losses and also to act in the place of conventional stabilizing surfaces. The fin resumed above the shroud and carried the top of a high aspect ratio rudder behind the shroud's trailing edge, its bottom end attached to the tailboom, with a midpoint cutout to allow for elevator movement. The elevator was supported by tailplane extensions beyond the shroud, similar to that of the fin.

Structurally, the shroud was a glass-fibre shell surrounding an aluminium spar and filled with polyurethane foam. The control surfaces were conventionally constructed from aluminium sheet. The XBD-2 had a fixed tricycle undercarriage, with wheels enclosed in fairings. The main legs were glass-fibre cantilevers, unusual at the time.

After the XBD-2 first flew on 26 July 1961 it was flight tested and slightly modified to simplify future production. It was intended to lead to the BD-3, which would have been a six-seater with bigger engines, more use of honeycomb panels, retracting undercarriage and a laminar flow wing, but this was not built.

== Aircraft on display ==
The sole XBD-2 is mounted on outdoor display at the entrance to Manitowoc County Airport.

== Specifications ==
Data from Jane's All the World's Aircraft 1962-63

General characteristics

- Crew: one
- Capacity: four total
- Length: 23 ft 8 in (7.22 m)
- Wingspan: 37 ft 6 in (11.42 m)
- Height: 12 ft 5 in (3.78 m)
- Wing area: 150.0 sq ft (13.94 m^{2})
- Airfoil: Göttingen 549
- Max takeoff weight: 3,300 lb (1,497 kg)
- Powerplant: 2 × Continental O-300-A 6- cylinder horizontally opposed air-cooled, 145 hp (108 kW) each
- Propellers: Hartzell constant speed

Performance

- Maximum speed: 204 mph (328 km/h, 177 kn) at sea level
- Cruise speed: 179 mph (288 km/h, 156 kn) maximum at 65% power at 9,000ft (2,740 m)
- Stall speed: 42 mph (68 km/h, 36 kn) with BLC. Without BLC 64 mph (57 kn;106 km/h)
- Service ceiling: 21,000 ft (6,400 m) service
- Rate of climb: 1,050 ft/min (5.3 m/s)
- Take-off run: less than 300 ft (90 m)
- Take-off distance to clear 50 ft (15.25 m): under 500 ft (152 m)
- Landing distance from 50 ft (15.25 m): under 500 ft (152 m)
