= Bede BD-8 =

BD-8

General information
- Type: Aerobatics aircraft
- Designer: Jim Bede
- Number built: 1

History
- First flight: 1980

The Bede BD-8 was an aerobatics aircraft developed in the United States in the mid-1970s. It was a low-wing, single-seat monoplane of conventional configuration, albeit very short-coupled, and of all-metal construction. The single prototype was under construction by Jim Bede when his company, Bede Aircraft, faced bankruptcy in 1977. The incomplete BD-8 was purchased by Mike Huffman, who completed its construction in 1980. It first flew on May 14, 1980.

== Specifications ==
Data from Jane's All The World's Aircraft 1982–83

General characteristics

- Crew: one pilot
- Length: 17 ft 5 in (5.31 m)
- Wingspan: 19 ft 6 in (5.94 m)
- Height: 6 ft 9 in (2.06 m)
- Wing area: 97.0 sq ft (9.01 m^{2})
- Aspect ratio: 3.9:1
- Empty weight: 975 lb (442 kg)
- Gross weight: 1,510 lb (685 kg)
- Powerplant: 1 × Lycoming IO-360-A1A air-cooled flat-four , 200 hp (149 kW)

Performance

- Maximum speed: 215 mph (346 km/h, 187 kn)
- Cruise speed: 190 mph (306 km/h, 170 kn)
- Rate of climb: 2,000 ft/min (10.2 m/s)
