= Bede HB-1 Super Demoiselle =

American ultralight aircraft of the 1960s

HB-1 Super Demoiselle

General information
- Type: Homebuilt ultralight
- Designer: Jim Bede

History
- First flight: 1966

The Bede HB-1 Super Demoiselle was an ultralight aircraft designed by Jim Bede in 1966 and marketed for homebuilding. It was designed to be powered with engines in the 65-to-100-horsepower (48 to 75 kW) range. It was named in honour of Albert Santos-Dumont's pioneering aircraft Demoiselle (French for "Dragonfly"), which had a similar general configuration.

== Design ==
The Super Demoiselle carried its pilot within an open framework suspended on struts beneath a parasol wing. A Bede advertisement of the time described "the 'open-air' flying thrill only possible with this type of aircraft." The prototype featured an aerodynamic fairing in front of the pilot's seat though.

Its V-tail was mounted on a boom that extended from the wing, and a single piston engine driving a tractor propeller was mounted on the leading edge of the wing. Although the prototype was fitted with a Continental A65, the design was intended for various engines up to 100 horsepower (75 kW), with a Volkswagen air-cooled engine named as a specific example.

It had a fixed, tricycle undercarriage, the main units of which were enclosed in spats on the prototype.

The wing was constructed of 15 identical fiberglass sections mounted on an aluminum spar, the first of Bede's designs to introduce this construction method to the home builder. The same Bede advertisement stated that the wing could be fabricated in a single evening.

The tail boom was constructed from the same material as the wing spar, while the tail surfaces were made from an aluminum honeycomb material. The framework surrounding the pilot's seat was square-section alloy tube.

The entire airframe consisted of only 85 components, and Bede claimed it could be built in just a couple of months for $700 (this price not including engine and accessories.)

The prototype was registered N590A in November 1966 and remained on the FAA registry until cancelled in 1974. (Note: Note that the FAA records the manufacturer name as "DANOISELLE" (sic)) The design was only offered for sale for a short time, appearing in only a single edition of Jane's All the World's Aircraft, the 1967–68 edition.

== Specifications (prototype) ==
Data from Taylor 1967, p.197

General characteristics

- Crew: 1
- Length: 18 ft 5 in (5.61 m)
- Wingspan: 26 ft 0 in (7.92 m)
- Height: 7 ft 3 in (2.21 m)
- Wing area: 105 sq ft (9.8 m^{2})
- Empty weight: 525 lb (238 kg)
- Max takeoff weight: 767 lb (348 kg)
- Powerplant: 1 × Continental A65 air-cooled, four-cylinder, horizontally opposed engine, 65 hp (48 kW)

Performance

- Maximum speed: 75 mph (121 km/h, 65 kn) (estimated at MTO weight)
- Rate of climb: 900 ft/min (4.6 m/s) (estimated, at sea level, at MTO weight)

== Notes ==
=== Bibliography ===
- "Aircraft Inquiry [N590A]". Federal Aviation Administration.
- The Illustrated Encyclopedia of Aircraft. London: Aerospace Publishing.
- Taylor, John W. R. (1967). Jane's All the World's Aircraft 1967–68. London: Sampson, Low, Marston.
- Taylor, John W. R. (1971). Jane's All the World's Aircraft 1971–72. London: Sampson, Low, Marston.
