= Bede BD-14 =

American homebuilt aircraft

BD-14
- Bede BD-14 artist's concept

General information
- Type: Homebuilt aircraft
- National origin: United States
- Manufacturer: Bede Aircraft
- Designer: Jim Bede
- Status: Production completed
- Number built: One

History
- Developed from: Bede BD-12

The Bede BD-14 was an American homebuilt aircraft, designed by Jim Bede and produced by Bede Aircraft of Medina, Ohio, introduced in the 1990s. The aircraft was intended to be supplied as a kit for amateur construction, but only one was ever built.

== Design and development ==
Designed as a four-seat development of the Bede BD-12, which was, in turn, a two-seat version of the single-seat Bede BD-5, the BD-14 was to feature a cantilever low-wing, a four-seat enclosed cockpit under a gull-wing canopy, retractable tricycle landing gear and a single engine in pusher configuration. The aircraft was built from fibre-reinforced plastic composite materials.

The company that currently owns the rights to the design, BedeCorp, indicates that production was not started due to the cost of tooling and the lack of funds.

== Operational history ==
In April 2015 no examples were registered in the United States with the Federal Aviation Administration, although one had been registered to the designer at one time.

== Variants ==
BD-14A
Prototype
BD-14B
Proposed production version.

== Specifications (BD-14A) ==
Data from AeroCrafter and Bede sales brochure 1994

General characteristics

- Crew: one
- Capacity: three passengers
- Length: 24 ft 11 in (7.59 m)
- Wingspan: 27 ft 0 in (8.23 m)
- Height: 8 ft 7 in (2.62 m)
- Wing area: 113.6 sq ft (10.55 m^{2})
- Aspect ratio: 6.4
- Airfoil: 66 415 (root) 66 418 (tip)
- Empty weight: 1,050 lb (476 kg)
- Gross weight: 2,200 lb (998 kg)
- Fuel capacity: 45 US gallons
- Powerplant: 1 × Air-cooled, four stroke aircraft engine , 150 hp (110 kW)
- Propellers: 2-bladed

Performance

- Maximum speed: 195 mph (314 km/h, 169 kn)
- Stall speed: 56 mph (90 km/h, 49 kn)
- Range: 975 mi (1,569 km, 847 nmi)
- Service ceiling: 19,000 ft (5,800 m)
- Rate of climb: 1,050 ft/min (5.3 m/s)
