= Katrina Mumaw =

American aviator

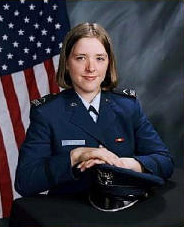
Mumaw's Air Force Academy photograph.

Captain Katrina Mumaw (born c. 1983 in Lancaster, California), is a United States Air Force Academy graduate and accomplished pilot who holds several records in aviation. On July 12, 1994, at the age of eleven, Mumaw became the youngest person to pilot a Russian MIG-29 fighter jet and also the youngest to break the sound barrier. Because of this media dubbed her "the world's fastest kid" during her youth.

== Early life and education ==
She was always interested in becoming a pilot when she met Jeana Yeager and Dick Rutan at the age of three after one of their last test flights of the Rutan Voyager, the first plane to fly nonstop around the world without refueling. Her first flight as a passenger occurred when she was 5 and when she became aware of the Air Force Academy, she was determined to study there and although her admittance was delayed by a dental malocclusion she was eventually accepted. She graduated from the academy on May 31, 2006, with a bachelor's degree in behavioral science-human factors engineering.

== Career and records ==
Mumaw first started piloting by competing in mock aerial combat at the age of eight and she held the record for the most victories in mock dogfights. She was also the youngest person to pilot a BD-10 (a prototype of the aircraft seen in the James Bond movie Octopussy) in 1993. On July 12, 1994, at the age of 11, Mumaw became the youngest person to fly a Mig-29 jet fighter and break the sound barrier with it. She first flew an Aero L-39 Albatros together with her instructor Vladimir Danilenko to prove she'd be able to handle the MIG safely. She satisfied the instructor and subsequently flew the MIG-29UB two-seat trainer to a speed of Mach 1.3 (940 mph). After that, she celebrated by performing a series of military-style maneuvers and aerobatics.

Because of her records, Mumaw has appeared in print publications and television programs including Sports Illustrated and Ripley's Believe it or Not!.

She is also an author of a paper on human performance titled: "PC-based Desktop Display versus Immersive Head-mounted Display Flight Simulator Performance".
