= Wayside Chapel, Rosamond, California =

Chapel in California

Coordinates: 34.87106°N 118.17746°W

Wayside Chapel is a chapel in Rosamond, California. It was built in the 1940s, funded largely by George Hummel, who sold off Mission land in lots to pay for it. Thomas Irvin Bailey was a pastor here from 1968.
