= George Hummel (business manager) =

American business manager and investor

George Philip Hummel (November 14, 1887 – December 10, 1965) was an American business manager and investor. Hummel was the engineer for Kern County, California, and has been cited as a county pioneer and a legendary figure in the Antelope Valley.

== Career ==
Hummel was born on November 14, 1887. He moved to Rosamond, California, in 1939 and became the business manager of the Los Angeles Union Rescue Mission. A real estate investor and businessman, Hummel played a major role in the development of the water facilities in Rosamond in the 1930s, and established the Rosamond Water Company. He was also one of the men responsible for the building of the Wayside Chapel, and was active in the running of local affairs, sitting on the board of the Rosamond Chamber of Commerce.

In 1951, he sold his water company to Samuel L. Berg when it had just 125 customers; the Rosamond Community Services District now provides water, sewer, recreation and graffiti removal services to the town of nearly 20,000 residents, covering the second-largest community (after Ridgecrest) in east Kern County.

== Later life and death ==
Following the sale to Berg, Hummel semi-retired from his real estate business, but remained active in local governance and commerce, serving as Director of the Antelope Valley Progress Association/Board of Trade and then vice president of the Lancaster Camp of Gideons International up until his death in 1965.

His funeral was held on December 13, 1965, at the Mumaw Chapel in Lancaster with the Rev. Norman C. Nelson, of the Wayside Chapel officiating. He was buried in Joshua Memorial Park of Lancaster and was survived by his widow Della K. Hummel, and one son, Walter J. Hummel.
