= Bede BD-22L =

BD-22L
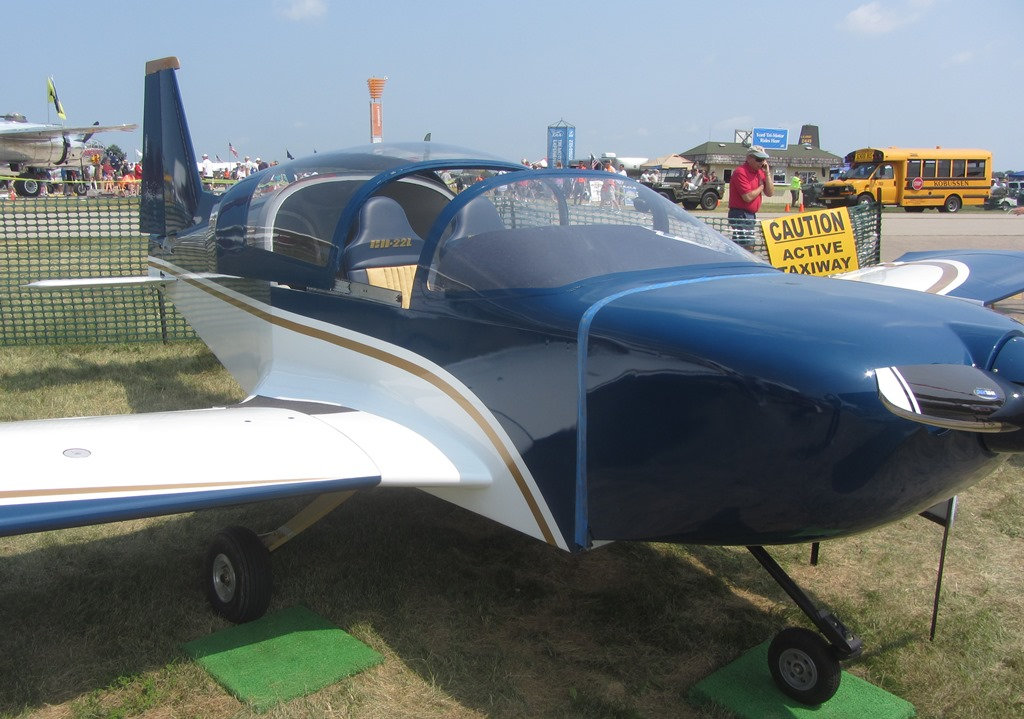
- BD-22L on display

General information
- Type: Homebuilt aircraft
- National origin: United States
- Manufacturer: Bede
- Designer: Jim Bede

History
- First flight: March, 2015

The Bede BD-22L is an American kit-built homebuilt aircraft.

== Design and development ==
The BD-22L is a two-seat, low wing, tricycle gear aircraft. It can be flown with the canopy open. The prototype N224BD first flew in March 2015, but suffered a fatal accident on April 1, 2015 in St. Lucie County, Florida. The development appears to have ended.

== Specifications (BD-22L) ==
Data from Aero News

General characteristics

- Crew: 1 pilot
- Capacity: 1 passenger
- Length: 20 ft (6.1 m)
- Wingspan: 32 ft (9.8 m)
- Empty weight: 850 lb (386 kg)
- Gross weight: 1,320 lb (599 kg)
- Fuel capacity: 30 U.S. gallons (110 L; 25 imp gal)
- Propellers: 2-bladed

Performance

- Cruise speed: 110 kn (130 mph, 210 km/h)
- Stall speed: 43 kn (49 mph, 79 km/h)
- Range: 520 nmi (600 mi, 970 km)
