= Bede BD-12 =

American homebuilt airplane

BD-12
- The BD-12 prototype

General information
- Type: Homebuilt aircraft
- National origin: United States
- Manufacturer: Bede Aircraft
- Designer: Jim Bede
- Status: Production completed
- Number built: One

History
- First flight: 1995
- Developed from: Bede BD-5
- Variant: Bede BD-14

The Bede BD-12 was an American homebuilt aircraft designed by Jim Bede and produced by Bede Aircraft of Medina, Ohio, introduced in the 1990s. The aircraft was intended to be supplied as a kit for amateur construction, but only one was ever built. It first flew in 1995.

== Design and development ==
Designed as a scaled-up Bede BD-5, the BD-12 featured a cantilever low-wing, a two-seats-in-side-by-side configuration enclosed cockpit under a gull-wing canopy, retractable tricycle landing gear and a single engine in pusher configuration.

The aircraft was made from fibre-reinforced plastic composite materials. Its 23.0 ft (7.0 m) span wing, mounted flaps and had a wing area of 93.0 sq ft (8.64 m^{2}). The standard engines used were the 100 hp (75 kW) Continental O-200A or the 150 hp (112 kW) Lycoming O-320 powerplant.

The aircraft had a typical empty weight of 680 lb (310 kg) and a gross weight of 1,310 lb (590 kg), giving a useful load of 630 lb (290 kg). With full fuel of 37 U.S. gallons (140 L; 31 imp gal) the payload for the pilot, passenger and baggage was 408 lb (185 kg).

The standard day, sea level, no wind, takeoff with a 150 hp (112 kW) engine was 725 ft (221 m) and the landing roll was 800 ft (244 m).

The company that currently owns the rights to the design, BedeCorp, indicates that production was not started due to the cost of tooling and the lack of funds.

The design was further developed into the Bede BD-14, a four-seat version.

== Operational history ==
In April 2015 no examples were registered in the United States with the Federal Aviation Administration, although one had been registered to the designer at one time.

== Variants ==
BD-12B
Version with 100 hp (75 kW) Continental O-200A engine.
BD-12C
Version with 150 hp (112 kW) Lycoming O-320 engine.

== Specifications (BD-12) ==
Data from AeroCrafter

General characteristics

- Crew: one
- Capacity: one passenger
- Length: 21 ft 6 in (6.55 m)
- Wingspan: 23 ft 0 in (7.01 m)
- Wing area: 93.0 sq ft (8.64 m^{2})
- Aspect ratio: 5.7:1
- Empty weight: 680 lb (308 kg)
- Gross weight: 1,310 lb (594 kg)
- Fuel capacity: 37 U.S. gallons (140 L; 31 imp gal)
- Powerplant: 1 × Lycoming O-320 four cylinder, air-cooled, four stroke aircraft engine, 150 hp (110 kW)

Performance

- Maximum speed: 215 mph (346 km/h, 187 kn)
- Cruise speed: 200 mph (320 km/h, 170 kn)
- Stall speed: 54 mph (87 km/h, 47 kn) clean
- Range: 800 mi (1,300 km, 700 nmi)
- Service ceiling: 21,000 ft (6,400 m)
- Rate of climb: 1,850 ft/min (9.4 m/s)
- Wing loading: 14.0 lb/sq ft (68 kg/m^{2})
