= Bede BD-17 Nugget =

BD-17 Nugget
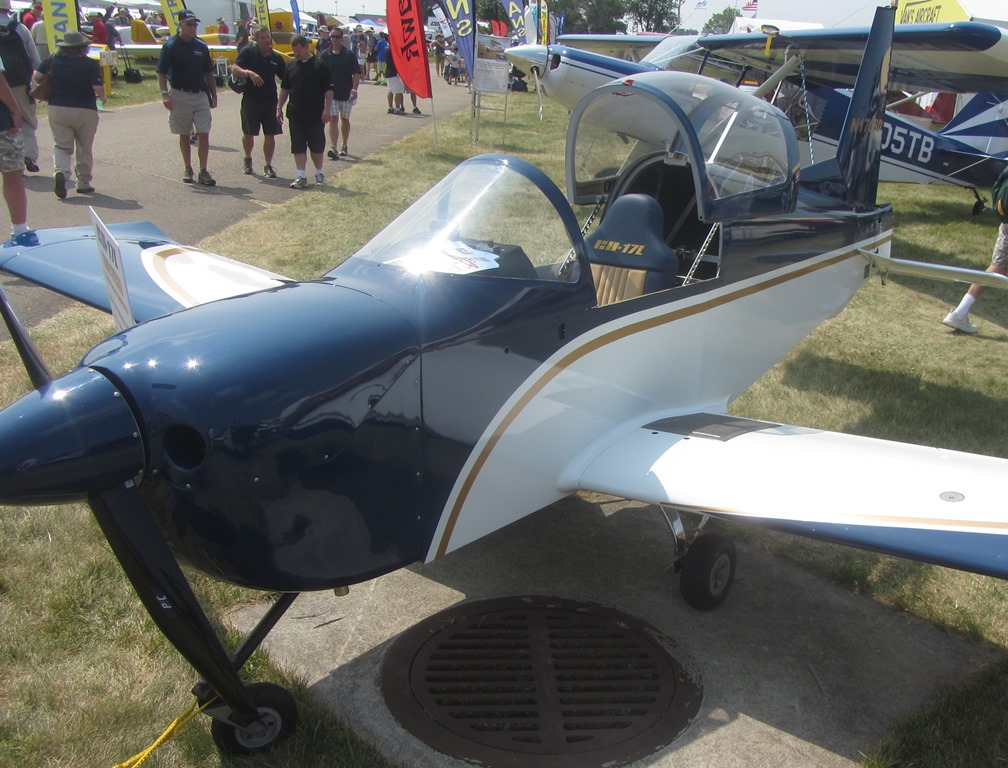
- BD-17L

General information
- Type: Single-seat homebuilt monoplane
- National origin: United States
- Manufacturer: Bedecorp

History
- Manufactured: 7 (2011)
- First flight: 11 February 2001

The Bede BD-17 Nugget is an American single-seat monoplane. designed by Bedecorp for amateur construction from a kit.

== Design and development ==
The Nugget was announced in June 2000 and was designed to be easy to build with a maximum of 100 parts. The first flight of the tricycle landing gear prototype was on 11 February 2001. It is an all-metal low-wing monoplane, it has optional folding wings and is available with fixed conventional landing gear with a tailwheel or a tricycle landing gear. It can be fitted with an engine between 45 and 80 hp (33.6 to 59.7 kW). The prototype had a 60 hp (45 kW) HKS 700E two-cylinder four-stroke engine. The pilot has an enclosed cockpit with a rearward-sliding canopy.

== Specifications ==
Data from Jane's All the World's Aircraft 2003-04

General characteristics

- Crew: one
- Length: 17 ft 6 in (5.33 m)
- Wingspan: 21 ft 6 in (6.55 m)
- Height: 7 ft 9 in (2.36 m)
- Wing area: 53.5 sq ft (4.97 m^{2})
- Empty weight: 450 lb (204 kg)
- Gross weight: 850 lb (386 kg)
- Powerplant: 1 × HKS 700E two-cylinder four-stroke engine , 60 hp (44.6 kW)

Performance

- Maximum speed: 195 mph (313 km/h, 169 kn)
- Cruise speed: 150 mph (241 km/h, 130 kn)
- Stall speed: 52 mph (84 km/h, 45 kn)
- Range: 702 mi (1,129 km, 610 nmi)
- Rate of climb: 1,050 ft/min (5.3 m/s)
