= Mumaw Chapel =

Funeral home in Kern County, California

Coordinates: 34.69413°N 118.14039°W

Mumaw is a chapel and funeral home in Lancaster, California. It is a popular location for the funerals of notable local figures.

== Notable funerals ==
- George Hummel (1887–1965) – businessman
