= Short-coupled aircraft =

A short-coupled aircraft or close-coupled aircraft is an aircraft design characterized by a relatively short distance between the wing and empennage (tail assembly). This configuration affects the aircraft's longitudinal stability and control characteristics.

== Design characteristics ==
In a short-coupled aircraft, the reduced distance between the wing and tail means the empennage must generate greater stabilizing forces to maintain aircraft balance. This often requires a larger tail surface area compared to conventional aircraft designs. The shorter moment arm can make the aircraft more sensitive to pilot-induced oscillation, potentially increasing the complexity of flight control.

== Aircraft types ==
Aircraft designs that frequently exhibit short-coupling include:

- Tandem wing configurations
- Many flying wing aircraft
- Specific aircraft models such as the Flying Flea and Saab Viggen

== Aerodynamic implications ==
The short-coupled design presents both challenges and potential advantages in aircraft engineering, influencing factors such as maneuverability, stability, and overall performance.
