= Bede BD-10 =

Kit-built supersonic aircraft

BD-10
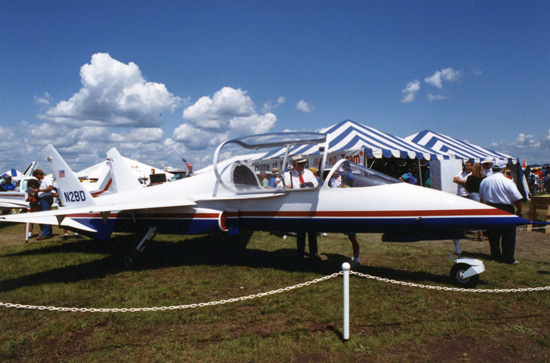
- The prototype Bede BD-10, circa 1994

General information
- Type: Recreational aircraft
- Manufacturer: Bede Jet Corporation; Fox 10 Corporation; Peregrine Flight International; Monitor Jet
- Designer: Jim Bede
- Status: Experimental
- Number built: 5

History
- First flight: 8 July 1992

The Bede BD-10 was Jim Bede's attempt to introduce the world's first kit-built jet-powered general aviation supersonic aircraft. After several years of testing and modifications, the project was taken over by investors in order to produce fully completed civilian and military training aircraft, but these projects were never realized. Five examples were built; three of these crashed, and the remaining two examples are unflyable.

== Design and development ==
The genesis of the BD-10 came about after the Bede BD-5 project in the 1970s, when the Federal Trade Commission (FTC) entered Jim Bede into a consent decree, forbidding him from accepting down payments for aircraft for a period of ten years. Bede worked on numerous other projects during this period with preliminary design begun by 1983 on a small jet. Within weeks of the agreement expiring in 1989, he announced plans for the BD-10J under the aegis of Bede Jet Corporation, at the Spirit of St. Louis Airport.

The BD-5's failure was due largely to the unavailability of a suitable engine; during the BD-5's history one engine company after another either exited the engine business or went bankrupt. Bede started the new design by selecting a suitable commonly available engine and then designing the aircraft around it. The selected engine was the General Electric J85, widely used in a variety of military aircraft and virtually identical to its civilian counterpart, the General Electric CJ610, available both in new-build and second-hand markets. Perhaps the best known military applications of the J85 are the twin-engined T-38 Talon and the closely related F-5 Freedom Fighter, with the most familiar civilian application being the early Learjet models. The new BD-10J design bore a strong resemblance to the T-38/F-5, although it was much smaller and used only a single engine. The Williams FJ44 and Pratt & Whitney JT12 were also offered as options.

The resulting design featured a shoulder-mounted cropped-delta wing with just over 21 feet (6.4 m) of span and a leading-edge sweep of about 30 degrees. Cropped-delta elevators were also used, although featuring a much greater 50 degree leading sweep. The large canopy extended a fair distance above the fuselage midline, in relative terms, so twin rudders were used, one on either side, to provide clean airflow. All of the controls were strictly mechanical, using pushrods. In order to deal with the increasing control stiffness with increased speed, the design initially specified two control sticks, a small side-stick with limited leverage for low speeds, and a full-sized one mounted in front of the seat with much more leverage for high speeds.

The aircraft was fairly conventional in construction terms, using aluminum sheeting for the majority of the airframe, and fiberglass for certain parts and fillets. The dry weight was only 1,600 lb (725 kg), about the same as light aircraft like the Cessna 172. Given the engine's nominal 3,000 lbf (13 kN) thrust at sea level, the design was significantly overpowered, generally considered a major advantage for any aircraft. Performance estimates were extremely exciting; after a takeoff roll of only 850 ft (260 m) even at a fully fueled weight of 4,400 lb (2,000 kg), the aircraft would climb at 20,000 ft/min to a cruising altitude of 45,000 ft (14,000 m). At this altitude it would cruise at Mach 0.9 (520 ktas, 595 mph) and at full power would reach Mach 1.4. The high-altitude cruise allowed flights up to 2,000 miles (3,200 km).

=== Prototypes ===
The first prototype, N2BD, was completed in 1991. The first damage occurred before the aircraft was completed. A newly minted A&P Licensed mechanic didn't follow the specifications for the static landing gear strut. He used thin walled aluminum pipe, which failed to hold the weight of the aircraft. This caused the twin booms to twist and the vertical stabilizers to be canted at different angles. This structural damage was never fixed and wasn't noticed unless looked head-on. The aircraft started testing at Mojave in July 1992. Early in testing it suffered more minor damage when the gear failed on landing, but the damage was repaired and it returned to flying. However, this aircraft was significantly heavier than originally intended, the empty weight ballooning from the design 1,600 to the prototype's 2,250 lb (1,020 kg). In order to keep the weight and balance within limits, fuel capacity had to be cut dramatically to 263 gallons, reducing range from the original 2,000 miles (3,200 km) to 1,500, although it was never to demonstrate anything beyond about 500 miles (800 km). Speed was equally poor; even at full thrust the plane was barely able to reach the transonic, at Mach 0.83.

In 1994 N2BD was flown to the Reno Air Races to drum up business. During this flight the skinning on the vertical stabilizers demonstrated some wrinkling, indicating excessive flex. The problem was considered minor, and a stronger tail design was added. Aviation Week and Space Technology published a positive report on the aircraft in its June 1994 edition, although it noted some horizontal "snaking", not uncommon on an aircraft that is longer than it is wide. By the time Omni Magazine reported on it in its March 1995 issue, the weight was given as 2,410 lb (1,090 kg), although it is not clear if this represents a real change in weight, or alternately changes in the secondary equipment.

On 27 August 1994, the prototype was on a demonstration flight from the factory when the canopy started to open during the takeoff roll. The pilot aborted the takeoff past V_{r}, and overran the end of the runway while braking. It was later learned that the "canopy open" indicator light could be extinguished even if the locking lugs were not in place, requiring a minor redesign to prevent this from recurring.

Eventually 63 $10,000 deposits (45 in the United States) were placed for the kits. By 1994 three additional airframes were under construction, one by Mike Van Wagenen of Nevada, another by Jim Priebe in Ohio, and the last by Frank Everett in California. However, during this period Chief Test Pilot Skip Holm left the project. Work on the BD-10J project by Bede seems to have stopped at about this point.

== Continued development ==
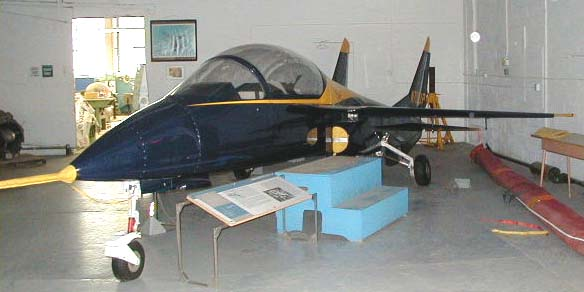
The Bede BD-10 in its Peregrine Falcon livery, c. 2005

Van Wagenen had already formed Fox 10 Corporation (or later Fox Aircraft) with the intention of helping kit builders complete their aircraft, by providing hangar space, tools, and guidance. The Federal Aviation Administration (FAA) later ruled this was illegal, although after Van Wagenen had moved on from this concept, rendering the point moot. In December 1993 Van Wagenen took over the entire BD-10 project, intending to produce completed versions of the design under the name Fox-10 and later Peregrine Falcon.

Fox Aircraft became the aircraft construction corporation under Peregrine Flight International. In addition to Fox, the group included Point 9 the Peregrine Falcon sales company and Aerospace Safety Technologies, which was developing the Thermion (R) Anti-Icing Technology.

In 1994 Fox's first prototype, N9WZ, was completed and entered testing. Although it had been modified to incorporate the stronger tail of Bede's design, it broke up mid-air on 30 December 1994 when the vertical stabilizers failed due to a crossflow condition, killing Van Wagenen. The National Transportation Safety Board (NTSB) later concluded that Bede's fix was severely under-designed, and offered nowhere near the strength that had been calculated. Fox had not performed any testing to verify the redesign of the vertical stabilizer spars before continuing flight testing, instead relying upon the data provided by Bede.

Peregrine Flight International then renamed the design the PJ-2. It redesigned the horizontal and vertical surfaces for another prototype, N62PJ. This aircraft crashed on 4 August 1995 when one flap failed to retract following a go-around. The resulting accident killed the company president, Joseph Henderson, and Peregrine ceased to exist.

In 1996 Bede sold the military rights to Monitor Jet of Canada, which intended to equip it with the Pratt & Whitney Canada JT15D engine and sell it as a basic trainer as the MJ-7. Monitor also purchased the single so-far completed kit, N700JP, its pilot apparently not interested in flying it. There appears to have been some interest on the part of the Portuguese Air Force as a replacement for its fleet of Alpha Jets in the training role, but nothing ever came of this. The aircraft was even mentioned briefly during the Canadian Parliamentary Debates.

When a group of investors in Bede's company threatened to foreclose, Bede declared bankruptcy in 1997. The investors formed Vortex Aircraft in San Diego intended to produce completed versions as the PhoenixJet for the military market, terminating Monitor's agreement due to a claimed failed payment. Oddly, Monitor purchased the original prototype, N2BD, at the same auction, although for reasons that are unclear it appears it was never moved. Neither company managed to find any interest in the design, and both companies disappeared, the lawsuit being dropped in 1998.

This left only the second kit-built aircraft, N7FF, still flying. It broke up in midair off the southern coast of California in 2003 after pilot Frank Everett had radioed a MAYDAY call in which he stated that the aircraft was "disintegrating". Everett did not survive.

The original prototype N2BD was hangared in Scottsdale, Arizona, when the company went bankrupt, and now belongs to Fuel Fresh Inc., which operates a number of jet aircraft. Monitor Jet's example remained in Canada, and eventually ended up in the Toronto Aerospace Museum, with its JT-15D engine stored separately.

== Examples ==
- N2BD: original prototype, owned by Fuel Fresh in Nevada, unflyable. This original tail number has been reassigned to a Dassault Falcon 900. Original prototype aircraft is currently assigned tail number N98MJ.
- N9WZ: Peregrine's kit, crashed
- N62PJ: Peregrine's kit, crashed
- N700JP: Jim Priebe's kit, sold to Monitor Jet, Was privately owned in Canada, now owned by the BD foundation. Unflyable but planned to be reassembled.
- N7FF: Frank Everett's kit, crashed

== Specifications (BD-10J) ==
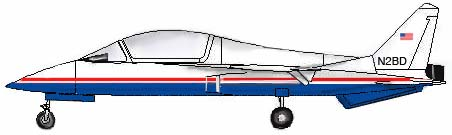
BD-10 first prototype color scheme c. 1991

Concept Aircraft: Prototypes, X-Planes and Experimental Aircraft

General characteristics

- Crew: one pilot
- Capacity: 1 passenger
- Length: 28 ft 10 in (8.794 m)
- Wingspan: 21 ft 6 in (6.55 m)
- Height: 8 ft 1 in (2.46 m)
- Wing area: 98 sq ft (9.1 m^{2})
- Empty weight: 1,600 lb (725 kg)
- Gross weight: 4,430 lb (2,014 kg)
- Powerplant: 1 × General Electric CJ-610 , 2,950 lbf (13.1 kN) thrust

Performance

- Maximum speed: Mach 1.4
- Cruise speed: 593 mph (957 km/h, 515 kn)
- Range: 1,550 mi (2,499 km, 1,350 nmi)
- Service ceiling: 45,000 ft (13,715 m)
- Rate of climb: 30,000 ft/min (152 m/s)

== See also ==
Aircraft of comparable role, configuration, and era

- ATG Javelin
- RFB Fantrainer
- Viper Aircraft ViperJet
- Margański & Mysłowski EM-10 Bielik
