= Bede BD-5 =

Homebuilt aircraft in the US

BD-5
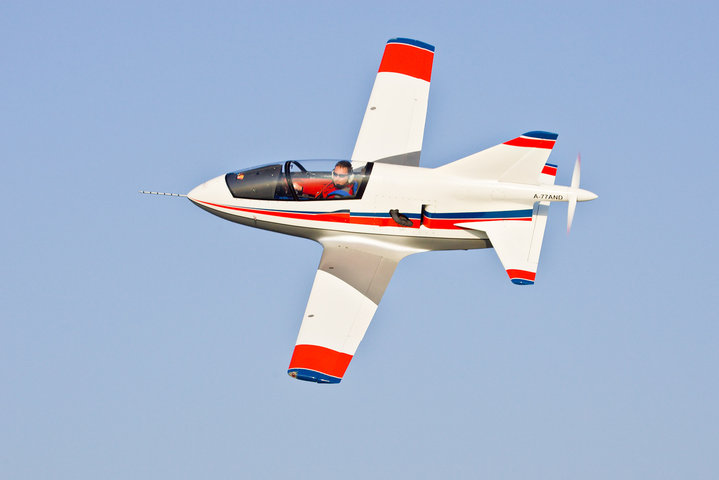

General information
- Type: Homebuilt
- Manufacturer: Bede Aviation
- Designer: Jim Bede
- Status: ~150 airworthy, ~30 flying (as of 2002)

History
- Introduction date: 1970s
- First flight: September 12, 1971

The Bede BD-5 Micro is a series of small, single-seat homebuilt aircraft created in the late 1960s by US aircraft designer Jim Bede and introduced to the market primarily in kit form by the now-defunct Bede Aircraft Corporation in the early 1970s.

The BD-5 has a small, streamlined fuselage holding its semi-reclined pilot under a large canopy, with the engine installed in a compartment in the middle of the fuselage immediately to the rear of the cockpit, either a propeller-driving engine – or jet engine in the BD-5J variant. The combination of fighter-like looks and relatively low cost led to the BD-5 selling over 5,000 kits or plans, with approximately 12,000 orders being taken for a proposed factory-built, FAA-certified version. However, few of the kit versions were actually completed due to the company's bankruptcy in the mid-1970s, and none of the factory built "D" models were produced, as a result of the failure to find a reliable engine for the design.

In total, only a few hundred BD-5 kits were completed, although many of these are still airworthy today. The BD-5J version holds the record for the world's smallest jet aircraft, weighing only 358.8 lb (162.7 kg).

== Design and development ==
=== The Micro concept ===
Development of the "Micro" dates back as early as 1967, when Jim Bede was inspired by the Schleicher ASW 15. Along with his chief designer, Paul Griffin, they make preliminary designs of what would become the BD-5. At the time, however, Bede was working on the Bede BD-4.

Serious work on the Micro started in 1970, with construction of the prototype starting in earnest late that year. While the BD-4 was fairly conventional looking, the Micro was a radical design. It is an extremely small one-seat design that looked more like a jet fighter than a typical general aviation aircraft, with the pilot sitting in a semi-reclined position under a large fighter-like plexiglas canopy only inches above the pilot's head. Behind the cockpit was a compartment housing a two-cylinder air-cooled 40 hp (30 kW; 41 PS) piston engine (Note: Some early articles, including Science & Mechanics, mention the 1600 cc Volkswagen engine in this role, but it is not clear how this would have fit in the very small engine bay.) driving a pusher propeller.

For improved performance the aircraft featured both a V-tail and retractable landing gear in order to reduce drag. Calculated drag was so low that split flaps and spoilers were added to the wing in order to improve deceleration for landing. This was apparently the first application of spoilers on a light aircraft. The low drag implied excellent performance; with the 40 hp engine it was expected to reach "nearly" 200 miles per hour (320 km/h), while the larger 55 hp (41 kW; 56 PS) engine allowed it to cruise at 200 mph with the 21 ft 6 in (6.55 m) "B" wing, and have 1,215 miles range. With the shorter "A" wing, 14 ft 3 in (4.34 m), it would be fully aerobatic and have a slightly higher top speed. Builders could optionally buy both wings, switching them in about 10 minutes.

In addition to being easy to fly, the BD-5 was also intended to be easy to build and own. The fuselage was constructed primarily from fiberglass panels over an aluminum frame, reducing construction time to only a few hundred hours. Although the early designs required some welding in the landing gear area, it was planned that this would be removed in the kit versions, so construction would require no special tooling or skills. (Note: Bede established 27 dealers across North America to assist homebuilders.) Even the cost of operation would be extremely low, offering fuel efficiency of 38 mpg_{‑US} (16 km/L). With the wings removed, the aircraft could be packed into a small custom trailer, allowing it to be towed away by car for storage in a garage, and from there to any suitable flat area for takeoff.

Bede published an information booklet about the BD-5 in November 1970. Several very positive magazine articles appeared at this point. The October 1971 issue of Science & Mechanics had the BD-5 on the cover, listing the price as $1,950. The associated article showed the construction of the original prototype, with numerous claims about how easy it was to construct. The August 1973 issue of Popular Science also covered the aircraft, although it listed the price at $2,965 with the 40 hp engine. The "miniature fighter" generated intense demand. As one author put it, "Even before the plane first left the ground, thoughts of flying the sleek, bullet-shaped aircraft with its pusher prop stimulated the imagination of nearly everyone who had heard of the program."

On February 24, 1971, the first $200 deposit to reserve a "place in line" to receive a kit was accepted, with the target shipping date being May 24, 1972. By August 1971, 800 deposits had been taken, even though the first BD-5 prototype had yet to complete high-speed taxi tests. By the end of the year, the company had taken over 4,300 orders, making it one of the most popular general aircraft projects in modern history.

=== Flight testing ===
==== N500BD ====
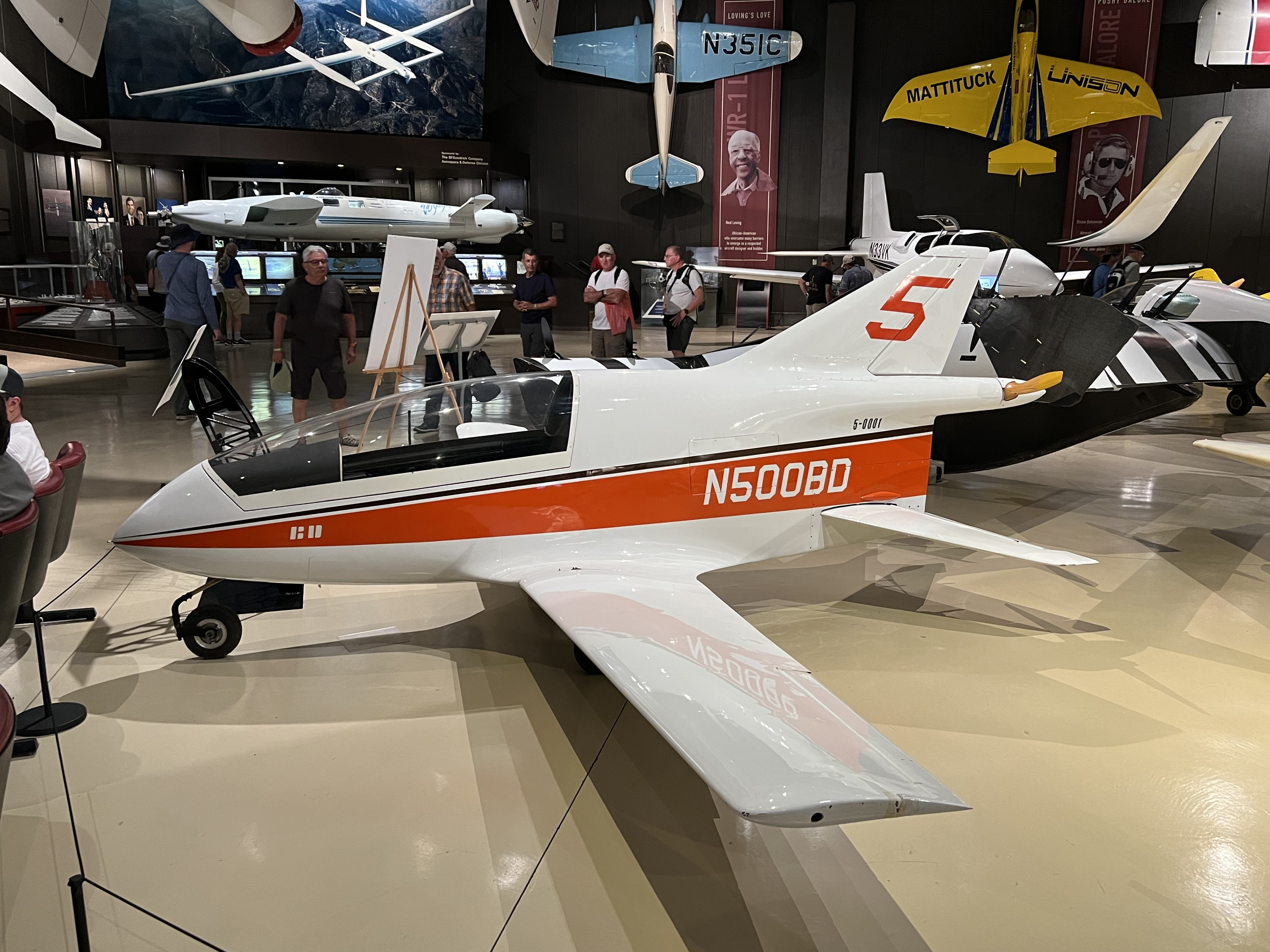
N500BD at the EAA Aviation Museum

The prototype, N500BD, flew briefly on September 12, 1971, powered by a 36 hp (27 kW; 36 PS) Polaris Industries snowmobile engine. This was sixteen months after deposits had been taken, which led to some griping in the press.

The stability of the aircraft with the original V-tail was marginal at best and clearly needed a redesign. With the original fibreglass fuselage, this was a time-consuming process, so the decision was made to switch to an all-metal fuselage with the components incorporating compound curves produced using hydroformed aircraft-grade aluminum alloy. These could be modified with relative ease during the testing cycle. It also made economic sense as the orders rolled in, the $30,000 in tooling would be spread over what was now a large order book.

By December 1971, the tooling for the new fuselage was in development. The aircraft now featured a longer, more pointed nose, whereas the N500BD had been patterned on the ASW 15 and had a more rounded, egg-like shaping at the front. While this work was in progress, Bede continued to experiment with modifications to the empennage, eventually abandoning the V-tail for a more conventional rudder and horizontal stabilizer layout with highly swept surfaces. Further testing on N500BD showed flow interference between the horizontal surfaces and the propeller, and the stabilizer was raised six inches to correct it, placing it about midway up the rear fuselage.

==== N501BD ====
The first example of the new fuselage arrived in March 1972, and was fitted with a new Kiekhaefer Aeromarine engine Bede had seen at the Oshkosh Airshow in 1971. Finished as N501BD, numerous small delays prevented it from flying until July 11, 1972. These flights demonstrated continued problems with the pitch stability; after briefly considering an all-flying stabilator, it was again redesigned with more area and less sweep, becoming much more conventional in layout.

The program was now far too large for Bede to handle alone. In March 1972, he hired Burt Rutan to head the flight test department, who was soon joined by Les Berven as chief test pilot. They took over development, giving Bede more time to work on business issues. This was proving difficult enough, as Kiekhaefer and Bede could not reach an agreement about deliveries, forcing him to change to a similar 40 hp 440 cc (27 cu in) Hirth Motoren design, then selecting a larger 55 hp 650 cc (40 cu in) Hirth, instead.

Several additional problems turned up during testing. Stick forces were very low, but this was easily addressed by making the servo tabs 50% larger. A more worrying development was that the engines all had problems with mixture due to changes in engine speed or load, which led to rough engine operation. In August, while Bede was demonstrating the BD-5 (N501BD) to the FAA in order to receive permission to fly at Oshkosh, the engine seized. On its deadstick landing, the aircraft overran the runway, buckling the nose gear. Incorrect mixture was identified as the cause of a second wreck of N501BD, in September 1972, when the mixture control broke and Berven had to execute another forced landing. This landing resulted in damage to all the gear and the fuselage as well.

Since N502BD would be ready in two months, they decided not to repair N501BD, and it ended testing after about 30 hours of flight time.

==== N502BD ====
N502BD ran into problems of its own. Early models used a variable speed belt drive system to transfer power from the engine to the propeller shaft. This was removed from N502BD and it suddenly began exhibiting a serious vibration problem during taxi tests. Experts were called in, and a freewheel clutch and additional bearings added to correct the problem, but it was not until March 26, 1973, that N502BD flew. From then on the test program seemed to go more smoothly, although this aircraft also suffered two dead stick landings, one from a pinched fuel line occurred while the plane was being observed by the Popular Science author, and another due to metal in a new engine's cylinder.

By the time the test program neared its conclusion, the aircraft had undergone major changes. One victim of the program was the shorter "A" wing, which calculations showed would only improve performance at speeds very close to V_{max} (the highest available speed). Flight testing also showed the stall speed with the smaller wing was decidedly high. Split flaps and spoilers had also disappeared. The canopy and cockpit dimensions had changed, the aircraft had new landing gear systems, and the tail was completely new. Estimated top speed was also reduced 10%.

The biggest change, however, was the engine. The original plans to use a 40 hp model proved to be decidedly underpowered, although they were still offered for a time. It was the need for more power that would fit into the very small engine bay that demanded the use of a high-revving two-stroke engine, and few examples of such a design in the desired power class were available. Additionally, two-stroke engines are very smooth running at high RPM, but have real problems running smoothly at low RPM. Even after months of effort, the Hirth designs showed rough running and high minimum power outputs when idled. Two-strokes also have high fuel consumption, and it was expected that the larger engines would burn between 4.5 and 5.5 gallons per hour.

By this point, it seemed the basic design was complete, and Bede turned his attention to other projects. One was the jet-powered BD-5J, which boosted performance to 305 knots (565 km/h; 351 mph). There was an attempt to sidestep the engine problem with the BD-5S glider (S for Sailplane), with lengthened wings and no engine, which prompted Air Progress magazine to sarcastically note, "At last, a BD-5 with no engine problems." This glider version did not fly well and the project was scrapped. Some work on a BD-6 was also carried out, essentially a downsized BD-4 single-seater. There was some criticism that Bede should have attended to the basic BD-5 rather than move on to these other projects. Bede also decided to seek FAA certification of the BD-5D as a production aircraft and sell it complete, and began taking $600 deposits for this model.

=== Deliveries begin ===
By the middle of 1973 the basic design was complete and the tooling set up for production. Now over two and a half years after the deposits started being taken, the engines were the only part holding up deliveries, so Bede offered to ship the kit with the engine to follow. This was a fairly attractive option; it meant the builder could get to work and hopefully complete the airframe by the time the engine arrived, at that point expected in September 1973. Many builders took the company up on the offer, only to receive incomplete kits and plans.

Initially, all three Hirth engines were offered; builders could keep the 40 hp engine, or "trade up" to 55 hp or 70 hp (52 kW; 71 PS). The latter, which Bede had developed with Hirth, was now considered the baseline engine for the aircraft; when equipped with the original 40 hp the aircraft proved to be underpowered. In a late 1973 newsletter to prospective owners, Bede suggested the 70 hp model and discouraged use of the smaller engines. Prices had risen throughout the 30 months since deposits were first taken. Originally priced at $1,799, the base price was raised to $2,599 with the 55 hp Hirth, and owners were offered a "trade up" for the difference in price if they had ordered the aircraft with the original 40 hp engine.

When 1974 came, engines were still not being delivered in sufficient numbers, although some started to arrive early that year. At that point, unexpectedly, Hirth went bankrupt after about 500 engines had shipped. Once again, the BD-5 lacked a suitable engine, but this time the search for a replacement ended with a Zenoah design from Japan. Development of this engine was lengthy, and in the end it would not be certified for export until 1978, although this was not anticipated at the time.

In the meantime, Bede came up with another novel solution to the problems of converting pilots to the new aircraft. They took an engine-less example and bolted it to the front of a pickup truck on a trapeze, attaching the pilot's throttle control to the truck's. Pilots could test fly the aircraft without danger – if a problem developed the driver of the truck simply hit the brakes. It was named the "Truck-a-Plane" and Jim Bede was awarded a US patent for the design.

=== Deliveries end, Bede bankruptcy ===
After more than 5,100 kits had been delivered to prospective builders, the kits stopped shipping as well. Although the company was effectively bankrupt at this point, work on the BD-5D continued for some time. The bankruptcy became official in 1979, by which point the BD-5 project was long dead. During the bankruptcy proceedings, it was learned that the money ostensibly being used to build kits was instead being spent on a variety of other projects. As a result, Bede entered a consent decree with the FTC to no longer accept deposits on aircraft for a period of 10 years.

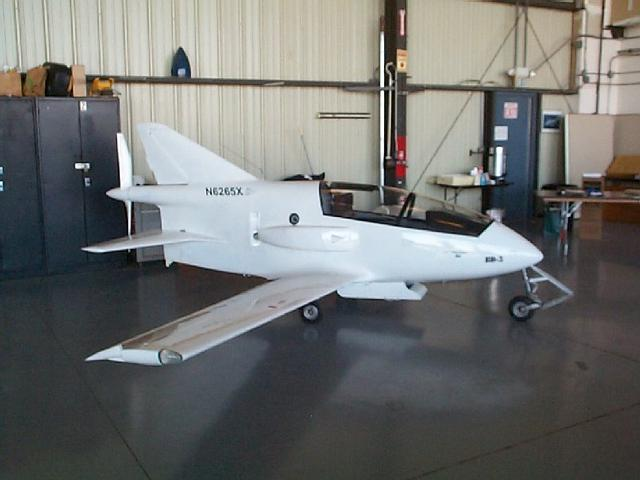
BD-5B powered by a Subaru EA-81 engine

Many owners stored, abandoned, or sold their incomplete kits, but a few hundred diehard builders finished them with a variety of engines, with installations designed by third parties and former Bede Aircraft dealers. Having to hunt for an engine was only one problem. The time to build the aircraft was much longer than quoted; original estimates from the company put it at 600 to 800 hours but users estimated it to be as much as 3,500 hours. Some of this was due to the need to fit their selected engine into an airframe designed for the Hirth, which was no longer available. Additionally, the construction techniques had improved somewhat since early Bede designs, but fastening the panels still required drilling, deburring, dimpling, drilling again and deburring again for each rivet. With the original mixed-construction design this would not have been as much of a task, but with the all-metal version this was extremely time-consuming. While Bede claimed the aircraft could be put together by anyone in a garage, builders generally agree that doing so without proper construction techniques could result in a potentially dangerous aircraft. One way to overcome that issue is to use a set of properly laid-out jigs to align and drill the pilot holes for the airframe, wings and other components. For all of these reasons, it was some time before completed BD-5s started to appear.

Additionally, some of the kits were shipped with missing parts, adding to the confusion. All of this led to a rash of kits being sold for fire sale prices, although this did allow the builders to complete kits at bargain prices.

=== Flying starts ===
Although Bede had suggested using the B wings, the earliest kits shipped only with the short "A" wings. All four examples completed with these wings crashed on their first flight, three on takeoff, one on landing. In three of the four crashes, the pilots were killed. Of the first 25 aircraft completed, with both the "A" and "B" wings, 14 crashed with 9 fatalities.

Even when examples with the "B" wings were completed, the safety record did not improve greatly. Several crashes in the BD-5B were found to have taken place due to engine failure on takeoff, both due to the mix of "oddball" engines as well as endemic cooling problems. The reason this is such an issue with the BD-5 is twofold – the high line of thrust means an engine failure immediately results in an unexpected (for most pilots) nose-up attitude change. Pilots who fail to fly the aircraft first and then attempt to restart the engine inevitably stall, with the associated consequences. This was aggravated by the fact the original wing had a very sharp stall with little warning and a nasty tendency to snap roll. To make matters worse, a documented manufacturing error in some wing skins delivered to kit builders exacerbated the problem. A rather small center of gravity range added to the problems of properly trimming the aircraft.

=== Further developments ===
With the demise of the Bede Aircraft Company, the BD-5 entered a sort of limbo while builders completed their kits. The early safety problems and the challenge of adapting a suitable engine exacerbated delays. Over the next few years, however, solutions to most of these problems arrived in one form or another. Many other changes have also been incorporated to improve the original design.

The problem of finding a suitable engine with 60–70 hp (45–52 kW; 61–71 PS) yet weighing under 100 lb (45 kg) was a serious problem in the 1970s, but today there are a number of off-the-shelf designs in this class. The widely available Rotax 582 is a 65 hp (48 kW; 66 PS) engine weighing 80 lb (36 kg) in standard configuration, almost tailor-made for the BD-5. Other engines successfully used in BD-5s include the Subaru EA-81, Honda EB1 & EB2 (with and without turbocharging), Hirth 2706, AMW 225-3 and 2SI 808. A BD-5A fitted with a Rotax 618UL 74 hp (55 kW; 75 PS) two-stroke two-cylinder, water-cooled engine held the FAI C-1a/0 class speed record (aircraft weighing under 660 lb (300 kg)) at 351.39 km/h (189.74 kn; 218.34 mph) from 1999 until 2010 when the Brazilian CEA-308 reached 360.13 km/h (194.45 kn; 223.77 mph).

Problems with the abrupt stall were mostly addressed by Harry Riblett, an airfoil designer who documented a procedure to apply a slight reprofile of the wing root airfoil, which softened the stall response of the aircraft without any significant performance degradation. The reprofile presents other unique problems, associated with the way it is applied to the wing upper surface, essentially glueing foam to the aluminum skin and covering with fiberglass. Similarly, the small center-of-gravity range has since been addressed with 5.5–13 in (14–33 cm) stretch kits for the fuselage.

Several companies were formed to help builders complete their kits, and many of the aftermarket modifications were worked into these services. As of 2015, BD-Micro Technologies of Siletz, Oregon continues to offer kit building support, including new-build kits featuring (optionally) all of these modifications and powered by a 64 hp (48 kW) Rotax 582 or 65 hp (48 kW) Hirth 2706 two-stroke engine, and even the BD-5T, a turboprop version using a Microturbo TRS 18 turbine powering a mechanically controlled variable-pitch propeller. Alturair, Inc. of San Diego, California also offers extensive parts and construction assistance services, as well as kits for the BD-5B and BD-5G models.

Bede Aircraft Company has since re-formed and has been working on several new designs. Before his death in 2015, Bede hinted at a two-seat tandem version of the aircraft, called the "Super BD-5", using a certified aircraft engine and a number of modifications and improvements, but nothing more than a preliminary design drawing was made available.

== BD-5J jet ==
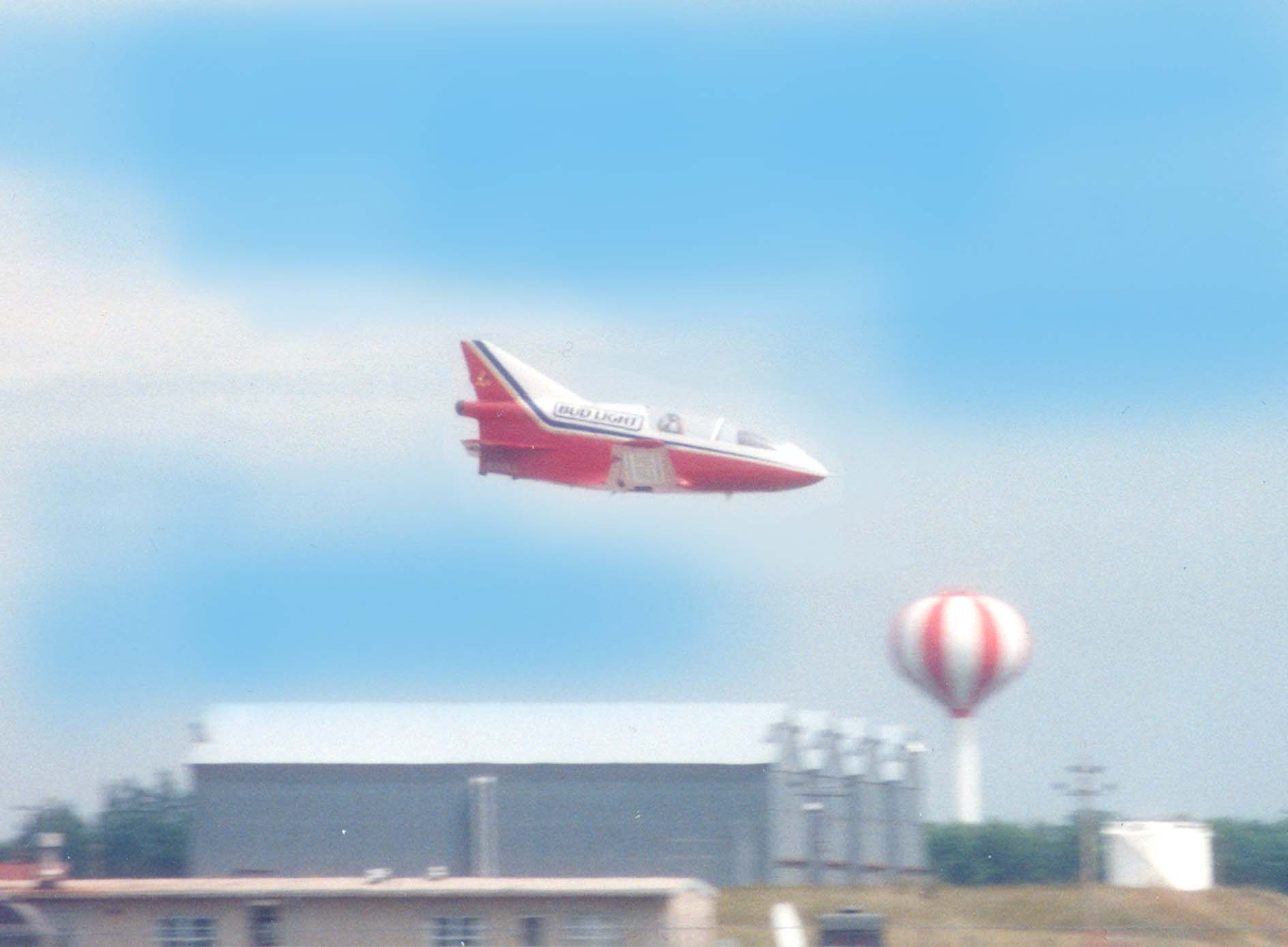
"Bud Light Jet" BD-5J at Fargo 1997

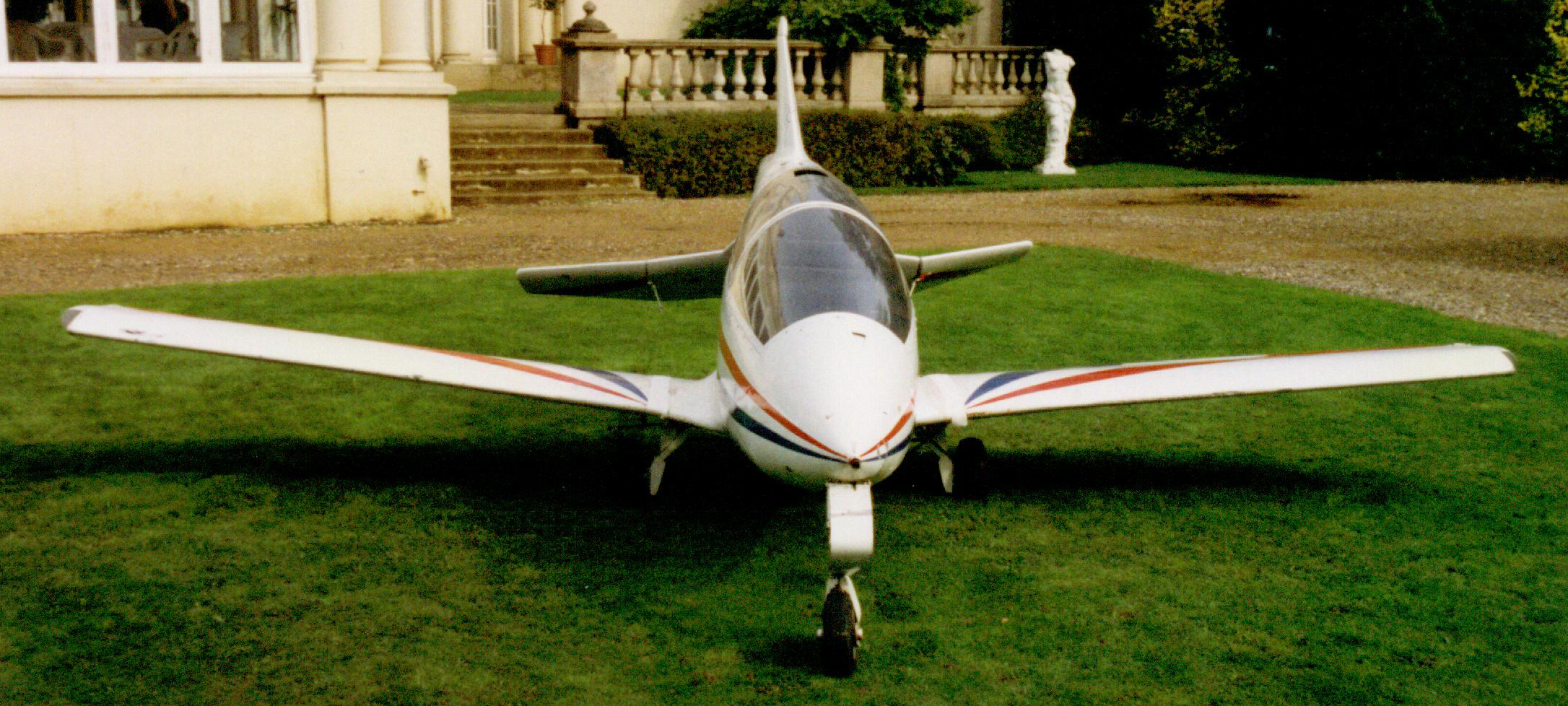
BD-5J from Octopussy

While the new Hirth engine was being tested, Bede decided to create a variant of the BD-5 with a small jet engine. The result was the BD-5J (also known as the "Acrostar Jet"), a 300 mph (260 kn; 480 km/h) aircraft. The design used the PBS Velká Bíteš PBS TJ100 turbojet with 337 lb (1.5 kN) thrust and the Sermel TRS-18-046 turbojet which produced 225 lbf (1.00 kN) thrust and which was used on a Caproni certified motorglider design. The original Sermel engines were produced under license by Ames Industrial in the USA. The wing was modified to an "intermediate" size between the original A and B wings, with a 17 ft (5.2 m) span.

An effort was made to interest Aeronca in producing the BD-5J commercially. A kit was shipped to Aeronca, but after assembling it, they declined -- reportedly because it had too many problems, and too much risk, and was too difficult to build -- and Aeronca returned the assembled craft to Bede.

Bob Bishop purchased 20 BD-5J kits as soon as they had appeared, and many of the flying examples started life in this batch of 20. Versions from the original batch became a popular airshow fixture. Throughout the 1980s and until 1991, Coors flew two of them as the "Silver Bullets". Budweiser also had a BD-5J called the Bud Light Jet, but that contract has long expired and the aircraft was lost as a result of an engine compartment fire from which Bishop successfully bailed out. The aircraft also appeared in the opening sequence of the James Bond film Octopussy (1983).

Many of these aircraft have since been involved in crashes. The loss of the Bud Light Jet was caused by an incorrectly specified fuel flow sending unit which burst in mid-flight and caused fuel to be sprayed directly into the engine compartment. The fuel ignited when it came in contact with the hot components of the engine, forcing the pilot to trade speed for altitude, climb, and bail out. The aircraft then went into a flat spin and pancaked into the ground, but was sufficiently intact to allow the cause of the fire to be determined relatively quickly. On June 16, 2006, while practicing for an air show at Carp Airport in Ottawa, Ontario, Canada, Scott Manning fatally crashed in his "Stinger Jet," one of the last BD-5Js to remain on the airshow circuit. The Transportation Safety Board of Canada report assigned probable cause of the wreck to the incorrect installation of the right wing, which caused the flap on that wing to suddenly retract in flight and create a "split flap" condition. The aircraft rolled to the right and Manning was unable to recover in time. On May 1, 2013, Guido Gehrmann was killed while attempting an emergency landing in his BD-5J which he flew as part of Red Bull's Flying Bulls team.

Beginning in approximately 2004, the BD-5J has operated in the national security arena. The aircraft is certified by the United States Department of Defense as a cruise missile surrogate, with Bishop's Aerial Productions offering a version known as the Smart-1 (Small Manned Aerial Radar Target, Model 1). The radar return and general performance characteristics make it a useful aid in training defense tactics against non-stealth subsonic cruise missiles. On June 27, 2006, while flying one of these aircraft, pilot Chuck Lischer, a highly experienced professional air show pilot, was killed when he crashed into trees on final approach to the Ocean City Municipal Airport in Ocean City, Maryland. The National Transportation Safety Board investigation determined the aircraft returned to land with more fuel than recommended for normal operations and the pilot failed to maintain speed, resulting in a stall and subsequent impact short of the runway.

The BD-5J has also held the Guinness record for the World's Smallest Jet for more than 25 years. Bishop originally garnered the record with one of his jets, and in November 2004, the record changed hands to Juan Jiménez, whose BD-5J weighed in at 358.8 lb (162.7 kg) empty, 80 lb (36 kg) lighter than Bishop's and the lightest documented weight for a BD-5.

== Variants ==
BD-5
Prototype and initial kit production aircraft with short wingspan.
BD-5A
Short wingspan version, with 14 ft 3 in (4.34 m) wings tuned for high speeds and aerobatics.
BD-5B
Main piston engined production kits with wings extended to 21 ft 6 in (6.55 m). Kits still available in 2011.
BD-5D
Factory built versions of the BD-5B.
BD-5G
Piston-engined production kit with wingspan of 17 ft (5.2 m) and a gross weight of 660 lb (299 kg). Kits still available in 2011.
BD-5J
Jet powered version. Equipped with PBS TJ100 engine with 247 lbf (1,100 N) thrust and 38.8 lb (17.6 kg) weight .
BD-5S
Sailplane version with extended wingspan. Flight testing was disappointing and further work was abandoned.
BD-5T
A turboprop conversion by BD Micro Technologies, powered by a Solar T62 gas turbine engine.

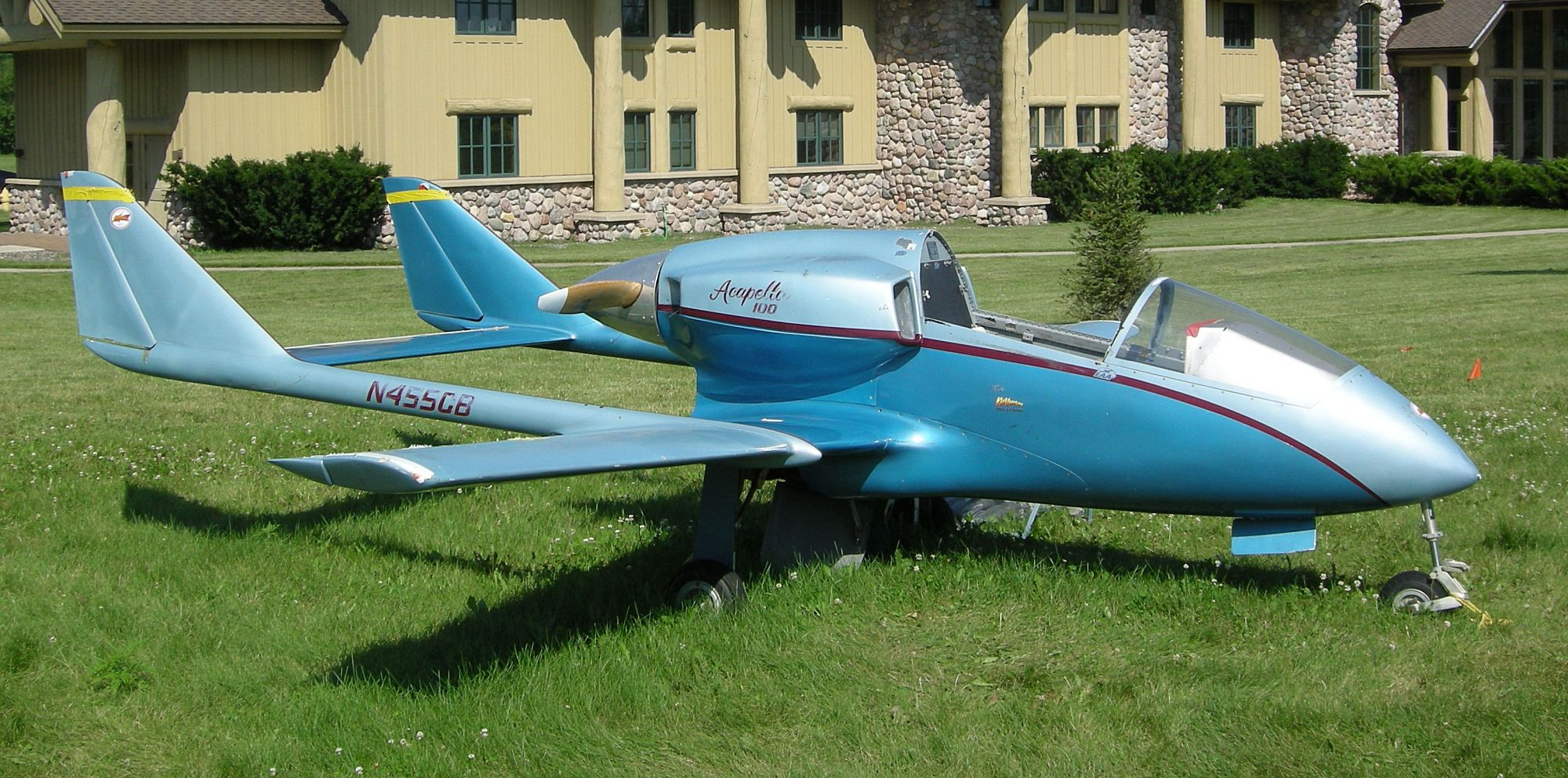
Barlow Acapella N455CB at Oshkosh

Acapella 100/200
An unusual adaptation of the BD-5, the Acapella 200-S appeared in the early 1980s. Designer Carl D. Barlow of Option Air Reno mated a BD-5 fuselage with a twin-boom empennage and fitted it with a 200 hp (150 kW; 200 PS) Lycoming IO-360 engine. Barlow intended to market conversion kits for BD-5 owners. The prototype, N360CB was first flown on 6 June 1980, with pilot Bill Skiliar at the controls. It flew poorly and was difficult to control. Later it was fitted with a 100 hp (75 kW; 100 PS) Lycoming O-235 and the span increased from 19 ft 6 in (5.94 m)to 26 ft 6 in (8.08 m) with increased fuel capacity, becoming the Acapella 100-L. It crashed in 1982. Only one further example was built, 100-L N455CB, which, though built in 1983, was registered in 1989 and later donated to the Experimental Aircraft Association's Airventure Museum in Oshkosh, Wisconsin, USA, where it is occasionally placed on display.
FLS Microjet
Model produced in kit form by BD-Micro Technologies powered by a PBS TJ-100 engine. The 500 hour kit was sold for US$189,500 in 2011.

== Aircraft on display ==
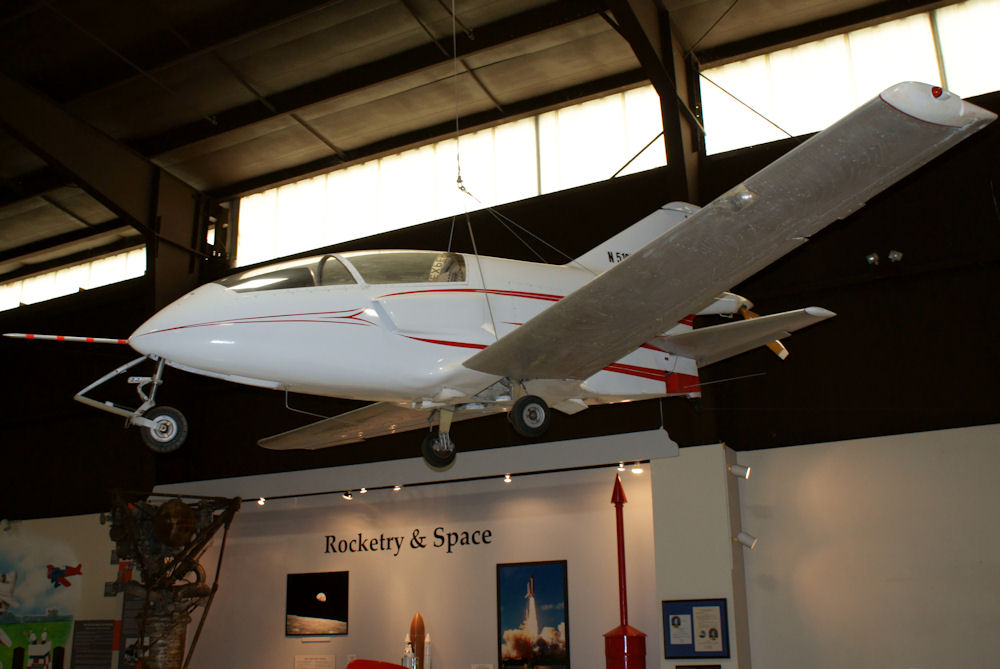
BD-5B at Florida Air Museum in 2009

As of 2002, there were an estimated 150 BD-5s in airworthy condition.

- BD-5 on static display at the EAA Aviation Museum in Oshkosh, Wisconsin. It is the prototype BD-5, N500BD, that started with a V-tail and fiberglass fuselage.

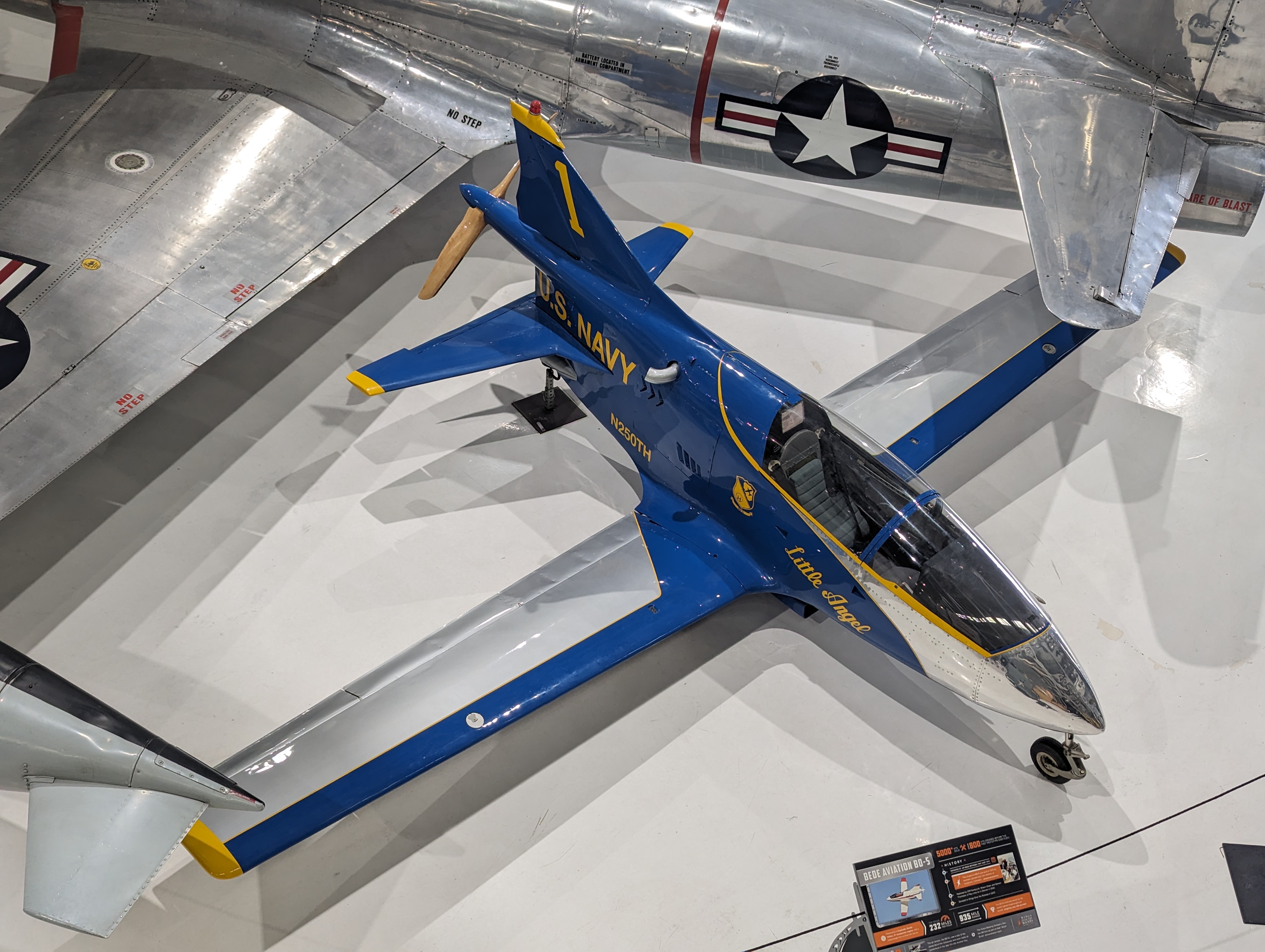
BD-5 on static display at the Wings Over the Rockies Air and Space Museum

- BD-5 on static display at the Wings Over the Rockies Air and Space Museum in Denver, Colorado
- BD-5B on static display at the Steven F. Udvar-Hazy Center of the National Air and Space Museum in Chantilly, Virginia
- BD-5B on static display at the Evergreen Aviation and Space Museum in McMinnville, Oregon
- BD-5J on static display at the Pima Air and Space Museum in Tucson, Arizona
- BD-5J on static display at the Ernie Hall Aviation Museum in Warren, Ohio. It is on loan from the Ohio History Connection.
- BD-5T on static display at the Hiller Air Museum in San Carlos, California
- BD-5J on static display at the Spirit of Flight Center museum in Erie, Colorado
- BD-5J on static display at the Sagebrush Cantina restaurant in Calabasas, California
- BD-5J full size replica from the 007 film Octopussy on static display at various touring locations as part of Bond in Motion
- BD-5 on static display at the Shannon Aviation Museum in Shannon, Ireland
- BD-5 on static display at the French Valley Airport (F70) in Murrieta, California
- BD-5J on static display at the Oregon Air and Space Museum in Eugene, Oregon
- BD-5 (N8065V) on static display at Science Museum Oklahoma in Oklahoma City, OK.
- BD-5D (N535X) on static display at the McAllister Museum of Aviation in Yakima, WA.

== Specifications ==
=== Bede BD-5B, 70 hp ===
Data from Jane's All the World's Aircraft 1974-5, p.250

General characteristics

- Crew: One
- Length: 13 ft 7 in (4.13 m)
- Wingspan: 21 ft 6 in (6.55 m)
- Height: 4 ft 2 in (1.28 m)
- Wing area: 47.4 sq ft (4.40 m^{2})
- Aspect ratio: 9.8
- Empty weight: 355 lb (161 kg) design, actual flying aircraft 230–260kg
- Max takeoff weight: 659 lb (299 kg)
- Powerplant: 1 × Hirth two-cylinder two-stroke, 70 hp (52 kW)
- Propellers: 2-bladed, 3 ft 8 in (1.12 m) diameter fixed pitch, wooden

Performance

- Maximum speed: 232 mph (373 km/h, 201 kn) at sea level
- Cruise speed: 229 mph (369 km/h, 199 kn) at 2,285 m (7,497 ft)
- Stall speed: 55 mph (89 km/h, 48 kn) flaps down
- Range: 935 mi (1,504 km, 812 nmi) optimum, with 30 min reserve
- Rate of climb: 1,919 ft/min (9.75 m/s) at sea level
- Take-off distance to 50 ft (15 m): 226 m (741 ft)
- Landing distance from 50 ft (15 m): 253 m (830 ft)

== See also ==
- Safran Microturbo – Manufacturers of the TRS-18 turbojet engine used on most BD-5J Microjets
- Sonex Aircraft SubSonex – Single-place homebuilt jet

Related lists

- List of very light jets
