= Bede BD-4 =

Type of aircraft

BD-4
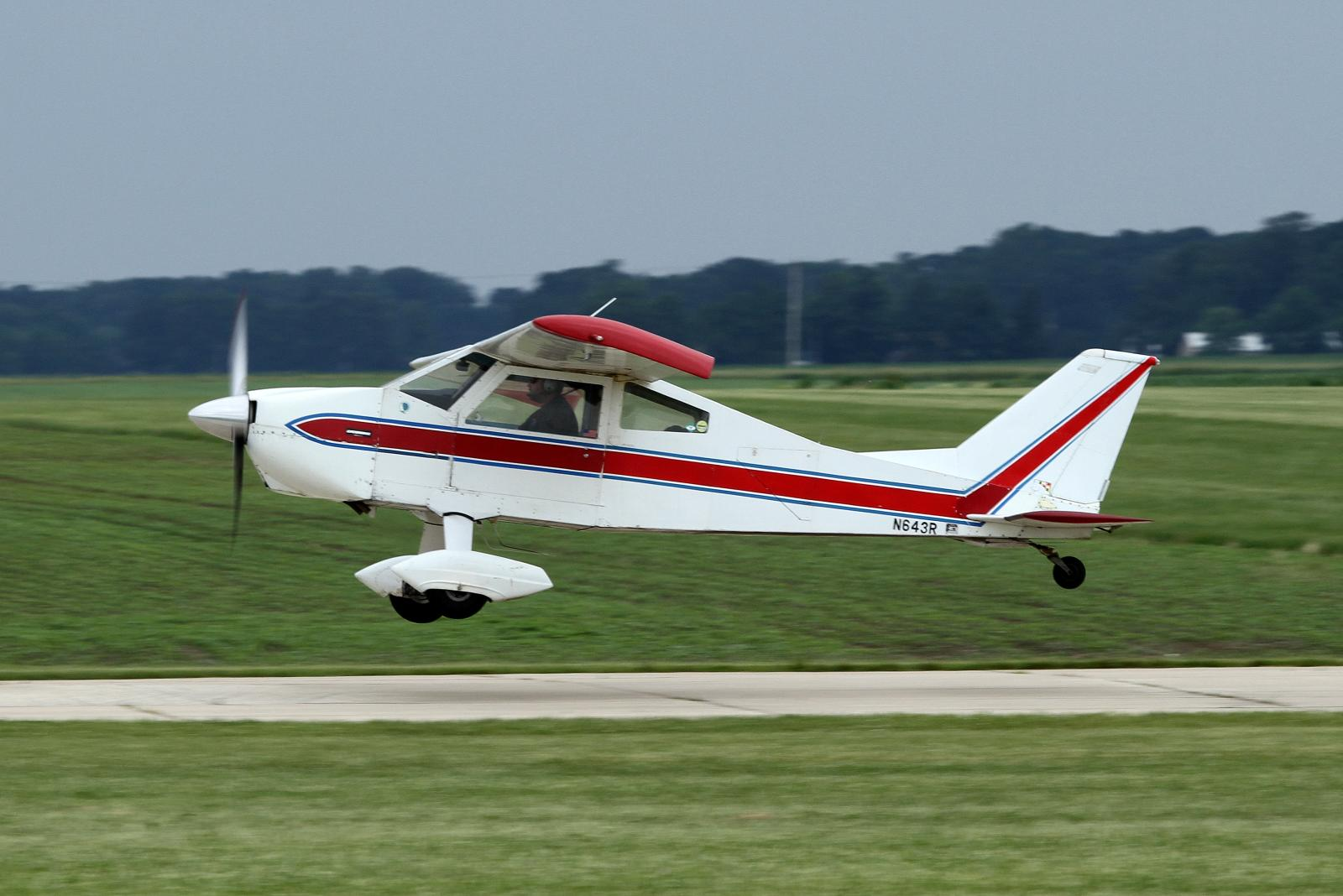
- BD-4

General information
- Type: Recreational/utility aircraft
- Manufacturer: Bedecorp for homebuilding
- Designer: Jim Bede

History
- Introduction date: 1968
- First flight: 1968
- Developed from: BD-1

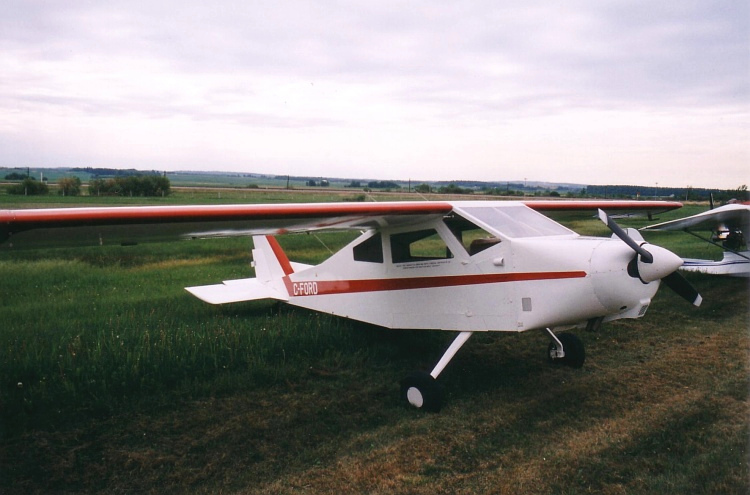
Front view of a BD-4 taildragger

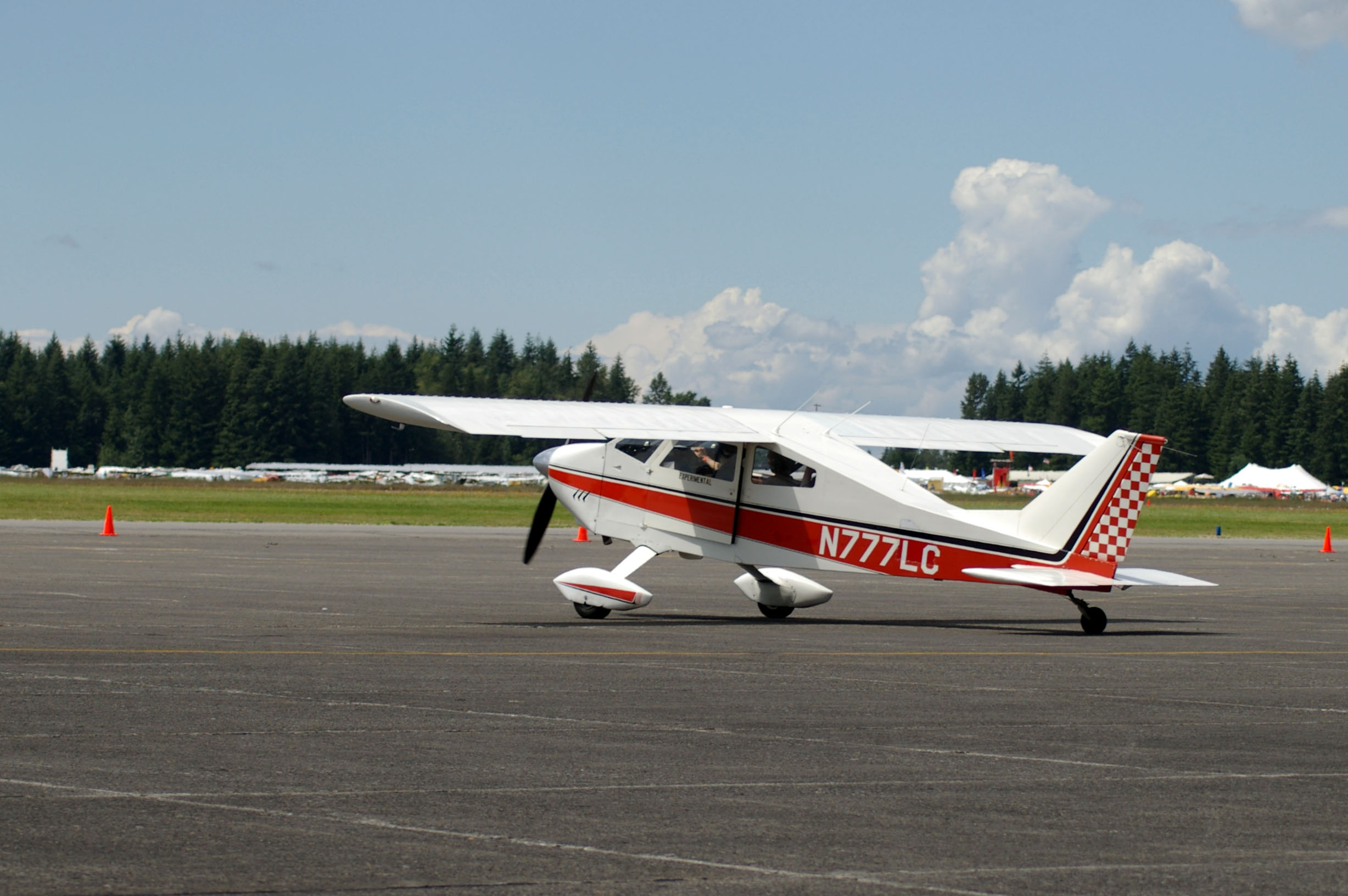
Rear view of a BD-4 taildragger

The Bede BD-4 is an American light aircraft, designed by Jim Bede for homebuilding and available since 1968. It was one of the first homebuilt aircraft to be offered in kit form. It remains one of the world's most popular homebuilts with thousands of plans sold and hundreds of examples completed to date.

== Design and development ==
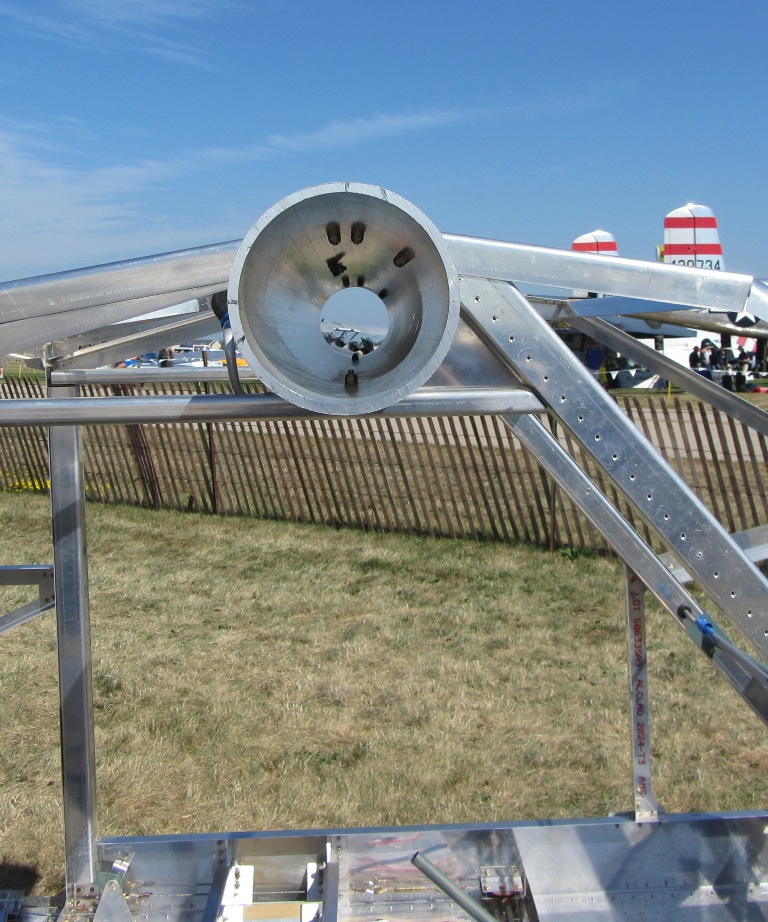
Tubular spar of a BD-4C

Based on his previous work with innovative light aircraft, the BD-1 (eventually developed into the American Aviation AA-1 Yankee) and BD-2, Jim Bede designed the BD-4 to be one of the first real "kitplanes" in the world. (AOPA has credited the design of the BD-4 to aeronautical inventor Dave Blanton.) The design was based on a high-wing cantilever monoplane of conventional design, able to be fitted either with a tailwheel or a tricycle undercarriage. When building the plane, it was also possible to choose between a two-seat or four-seat version.

The intention was to allow people with little or no fabrication experience to start with a set of comprehensive plans and work up to a bolt-together operation in which complex components were provided from the factory. In order to simplify construction, there were few curved surfaces and most of the fuselage was made up of flat aluminum sheeting. The only major components with compound curves were the engine cowling and landing gear spats, which were made of fiberglass. The fuselage was constructed of aluminum angle braces bolted together to form a truss frame.

An innovative feature of the BD-4 was the wing structure, which employed a 'panel-rib' constructed in sections, consisting of a rib whose upper edge was extended horizontally to become one section of the wing surface. The wing was progressively built up by sliding these sections together over the tubular spar and fastening them together where they met. One downside to the panel-rib construction was not noticed until the aircraft had been in service for some time. Because the panels were glued together, they formed a liquid-tight bond, unlike conventional systems using rivets. Instead of using a separate tank to hold fuel, builders simply drilled holes in the ribs to interconnect the sections to form a tank. In service, it was found that leaks inevitably developed due to problems like improper seals and natural flexing of the wing. BedeCorp later redesigned the wing to use a more conventional system with separate fuel tanks in the BD-4C.

Although the original wing design was easy to build, the more recent BD-4B features a redesigned, more conventional, metal wing with a tubular spar bonded to honeycomb ribs.

The aircraft remained available as plans for amateur construction in 2017, from Bedecorp of Medina, Ohio, United States.

Bede also wrote a 165-page BD-4 builder's book, Build Your Own Airplane, giving the amateur builder a perspective on construction techniques.

== Variants ==
BD-4B
Two-seat or four-seat model with 1,250 lb (567 kg) empty weight and 2,400 lb (1,089 kg) gross weight. Estimated construction time is 900 hours. 700 completed and flown by 2011.
BD-4C
Improved four-seat model with 1,200 lb (544 kg) empty weight and 2,400 lb (1,089 kg) gross weight. Estimated construction time is 700 hours. Two completed and flown by 2011.
BD-16
Proposed stretched, six-seat variant, 1998. Not built.

== Specifications (BD-4B) ==
Data from Kitplanes and The Incomplete Guide to Airfoil Usage

General characteristics

- Crew: one
- Capacity: three passengers
- Length: 21.4 ft (6.5 m)
- Wingspan: 25.6 ft (7.8 m)
- Wing area: 110 sq ft (10 m^{2})
- Airfoil: NACA 64-415
- Empty weight: 1,250 lb (567 kg)
- Gross weight: 2,400 lb (1,089 kg)
- Fuel capacity: 52 U.S. gallons (200 L; 43 imp gal)
- Powerplant: 1 × Lycoming IO-360 four cylinder horizontally opposed piston aircraft engine, 200 hp (150 kW)
- Propellers: 2-bladed constant speed propeller

Performance

- Cruise speed: 198 mph (319 km/h, 172 kn)
- Stall speed: 61 mph (98 km/h, 53 kn)
- Range: 900 mi (1,400 km, 780 nmi)
- Rate of climb: 1,700 ft/min (8.6 m/s)

== See also ==
Aircraft of comparable role, configuration, and era

- Wittman Tailwind
