= Jim Bede =

American aviation inventor

James R. Bede
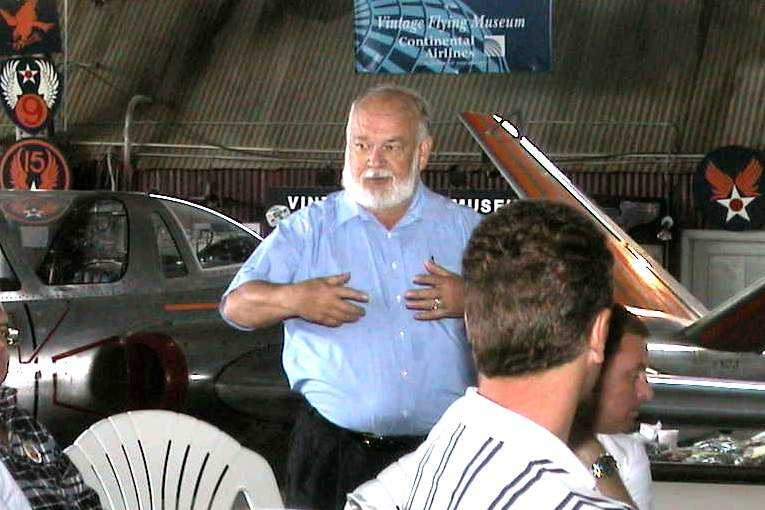
- Aircraft designer Jim Bede, at the BD-5 Expo 2000 in Fort Worth, Texas
- Born: April 17, 1933
- Died: July 9, 2015 (aged 82); Cleveland, Ohio, U.S.
- Occupation: Aircraft designer

James R. Bede (April 17, 1933 – July 9, 2015) was an American aircraft designer and developer, particularly noted for his development of influential, fast, efficient, light aircraft, including his BD-1 (forerunner of the Grumman-American line), and the BD-4, BD-5 and BD-10 kitplanes. He designed well over a dozen aircraft starting in the 1960s, but a string of business failures, and legal, technical and safety problems kept most of these designs out of widespread use.

== Bede Aviation ==
Bede was raised in Cleveland, Ohio. He graduated from West Technical School in Cleveland in 1952 and attended Fenn College and the Municipal University of Wichita, receiving his Aeronautical Engineer Bachelor of Science Degree in 1957. He started work as a performance engineer with North American Aviation that year, where he worked on the FJ-4 Fury and A3J Vigilante projects for the United States Navy.

He stayed at North American only briefly, returning home to Cleveland in 1961 to form Bede Aviation with his father James, in order to produce a kit-built aircraft of his own design, the BD-1. At the time, the general aviation market was priced beyond the means of the average consumer. Bede believed the way to solve this problem was to have prospective pilots build their own aircraft, as labor costs were a major part of the overall price of a delivered aircraft.

The BD-1 was a simple and fairly conventional low-wing two-seat design that used some of the latest techniques in aircraft construction. The fuselage was built primarily of aluminum honeycomb bonded together instead of riveted. This not only made the plane light, but also very strong; it was to be fully aerobatic and stressed to 9g. Performance would likewise be excellent, estimated at 135 knots (250 km/h) with a 108 hp Lycoming O-235 engine, compared to a Cessna 152 which reached about 110 knots (200 km/h) with a similar engine.

In order to make the plane more practical for the average owner, the wings could be folded and the aircraft towed behind a car, allowing it to be stored at home in a garage and towed to the airport. The kit, including a rebuilt 65 hp engine, would list for US$2,500. Versions with the more powerful O-235 were also offered, listed at $4,200.

Development dragged on and a lot of money was expended without delivering a final design. A few local Cleveland businessmen took control of the company in 1968 and renamed it American Aviation in order to produce the design in complete factory-built form as the American AA-1. A number of changes were later introduced into the design to make it more stable, notably a larger horizontal tail, and then a more forgiving airfoil on the main wing. The AA-1 and follow-on designs became fairly popular, notably the four-seat AA-5 Traveller. The company was later purchased by Grumman, becoming Grumman American.

== Record flights and experiments ==
During the BD-1 design Bede also worked on several other designs. One of these was the XBD-2, an experimental boundary layer control design based on a system designed by the Aerophysics Department of Mississippi State University. The system used 164,000 holes drilled into the surface of the wing to suck air from the boundary layer into the interior of the wing, thereby reducing skin friction for better performance, as well as keeping the boundary layer "attached" over a wider variety of angles of attack and thereby increasing lift during high-angle flight and doubling maximum lift as a result. Other interesting design features were the use of two engines driving a common pusher propeller, aluminum honeycomb panels, and fiberglass landing gear struts. After 50 hours of testing, the aircraft was donated to the Experimental Aircraft Association.

The basic layout of the XBD-2 was also used in the BD-3 pusher design, but this remained a study. An "executive version" was also designed as the BD-7, but again without progressing past the early design stage.

After being expelled from what became American Aviation, Bede tried his hand at a record breaking around-the-world flight in a modified Schweizer SGS 2-32 powered glider he called the BD-2. He nicknamed the airplane "LOVE", an acronym for "Low Orbit, Very Efficient". The aircraft was modified to dramatically increase fuel capacity to 565 gallons (2,140 L) with two additional fuselage tanks, sealing the wings to turn them into tanks, and adding wing-tip tanks as well. It was completed in April 1966 (some sources say 1968), and while he did not attempt the two-hop-around-the-world trip, Bede set several distance and endurance records, including a 70-hour endurance record in October 1969. This flight ended prematurely following an electrical failure after having covered just under 9,000 miles (14,000 km). AOPA has credited the design of the BD-2 to aeronautical inventor Dave Blanton.

== Bede Aircraft ==
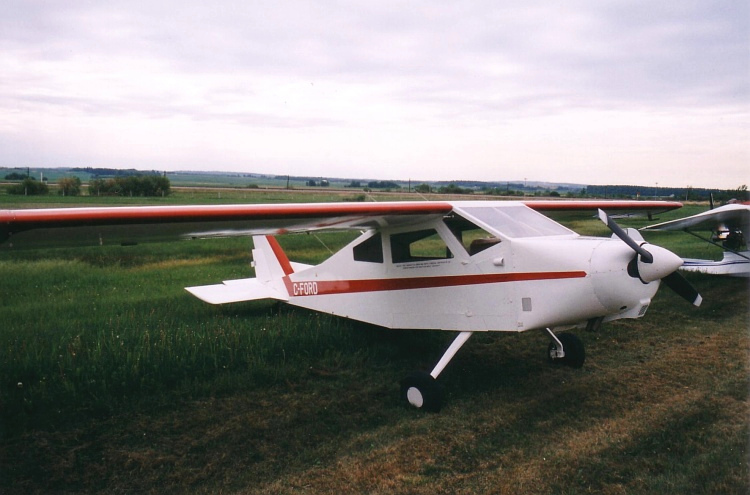
BD-4 equipped with conventional landing gear

Bede remained convinced of the validity of the kit plane market, and re-formed his company as Bede Aircraft. Here he started the design of an even simpler-to-build aircraft, the Bede BD-4. (AOPA has credited the design of the BD-4 to aeronautical inventor Dave Blanton.)

The BD-4 used more conventional construction techniques, based on a simple high-wing design, and had few curved surfaces. Most of the fuselage was flat aluminum sheeting, the only major components with compound curves being the fiberglass engine cowling and landing gear pants. One innovation was "panel-rib" construction which reduced building time of the wing. The wing was constructed in sections using ribs whose upper lip was "extended" horizontally to form part of the wing surface as well. The wing was built up by sliding these sections together over the tubular spar and joining them where they met.

Like the BD-1, the BD-4 offered excellent performance; using the same 108 hp Lycoming O-235 as the AA-1 it could reach 130 knots. It could also be equipped with engines up to 220 hp, which was to top out at 190 knots (350 km/h) with a 170 kn (310 km/h) low-power cruise. The aircraft could be completed in either tricycle or tail-dragger configurations.

The BD-4 first appeared in 1968 and thousands of plans were sold, hundreds were built, and many are still flying today. Early performance estimates were overstated; even with the large engines, speeds were more typically 130-150 kt (240–280 km/h). The aircraft has an excellent safety record.

== The BD-5 ==
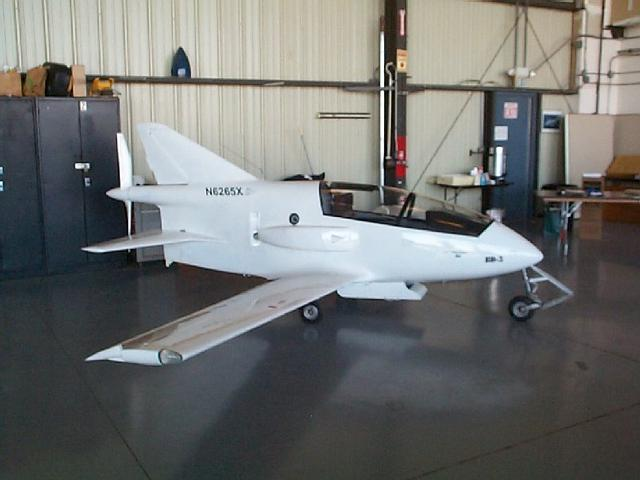
BD-5

Even while the BD-4 was in development, Bede was working on a more ambitious design, the BD-5 Micro.

The Micro was a small single-seater that looked like a jet fighter, with the pilot sitting semi-reclined under a large fighter-like Plexiglas canopy. The fuselage was originally to be constructed from fiberglass panels over an aluminum frame, housing a two-cylinder air-cooled 40 hp engine driving a pusher propeller. The aircraft featured retractable undercarriage, split flaps, spoilers to reduce speed for landing, and a V-tail for decreased drag in cruise. Two versions were planned — the BD-5A with "short" wings for high speeds, and the BD-5B with 4 ft (1.2 m) longer wings for range and powered glider use. Performance of the BD-5A was claimed to be 210 mph (340 km/h) in cruise.

Although Bede had started design work as early as 1967, BD-4 development delayed any serious effort until about 1970 when work started in earnest, and they published an information booklet about it in early 1971. Magazine articles appeared even at this early date, most notably a widely read article in Popular Science. On February 24, 1971, the first $200 deposit to reserve a "place in line" to receive a kit was accepted, with a target shipping date of May 24, 1972. By the end of the year, they had over 4,000 orders. The economics of mass production allowed hydroformed aluminum components to replace fiberglass.

The prototype flew briefly on September 12, 1971, powered by a 36 hp Polaris Industries snowmobile engine. Stability with the original V-tail was marginal, and clearly needed a redesign. In early 1972 Bede hired Burt Rutan to head the flight test department, and he made a number of improvements. Most notable was a new larger "conventional" tail, and a slightly lengthened and "pointier" fuselage. Spoilers and split flaps were eliminated at this time.

A more intractable problem was repeated engine failures. To meet weight limitations the design required an engine weighing less than 100 pounds (45 kg). This wouldn't have been a problem with the original intention of using a 40 hp engine, but as the design matured it was realized that 65 to 70 hp would be needed. This made the use of any "off-the-shelf" aircraft engine impossible. Instead Bede selected a two-stroke engine which offered a much better power-to-weight ratio. The plane entered testing with the 440cc Polaris design, but this was replaced with a similar engine from Keikhaefer Aeromarine. This engine proved to be extremely unreliable, and was replaced by an engine from Hirth Motoren, available in 40, 65 and 70 hp versions.

By this time the design was finalized, and Bede offered the kit with the engine to follow. Many took Bede up on the offer, hoping to simply put an engine into a completed airframe. At that time, though, Hirth unexpectedly went bankrupt. Once again a suitable engine needed to be found, which led to the Xenoah design from Japan being chosen. Kits continued to ship, but choosing an engine led to lengthy delays and by the time 5,100 kits had been shipped the company was insolvent.

During this time Bede was also involved in a project to build an inexpensive BD-4-based aircraft for use in Africa, but this project fizzled. He also worked on new aircraft designs, including the Bede BD-8, a single-place aerobatic aircraft. The prototype was being built when the company went bankrupt, and was purchased and completed by Mike Huffman who showed it at Oshkosh in 1980. Bede also worked on an ultralight aircraft, the Bede BD-9 Super Demoiselle, as well as an inflatable hang glider, the Bede Wing.

Although the company was effectively bankrupt at this point, work on the BD-5D continued for some time. The bankruptcy became official in 1979, by which point the BD-5 project was dead. During the bankruptcy proceedings it was learned that the money ostensibly being used to build kits was instead spent on a variety of projects, $9 million having disappeared in the process. As a result, Bede entered a consent decree with the FTC to no longer accept deposits on aircraft for a period of ten years.

== BD-5J ==
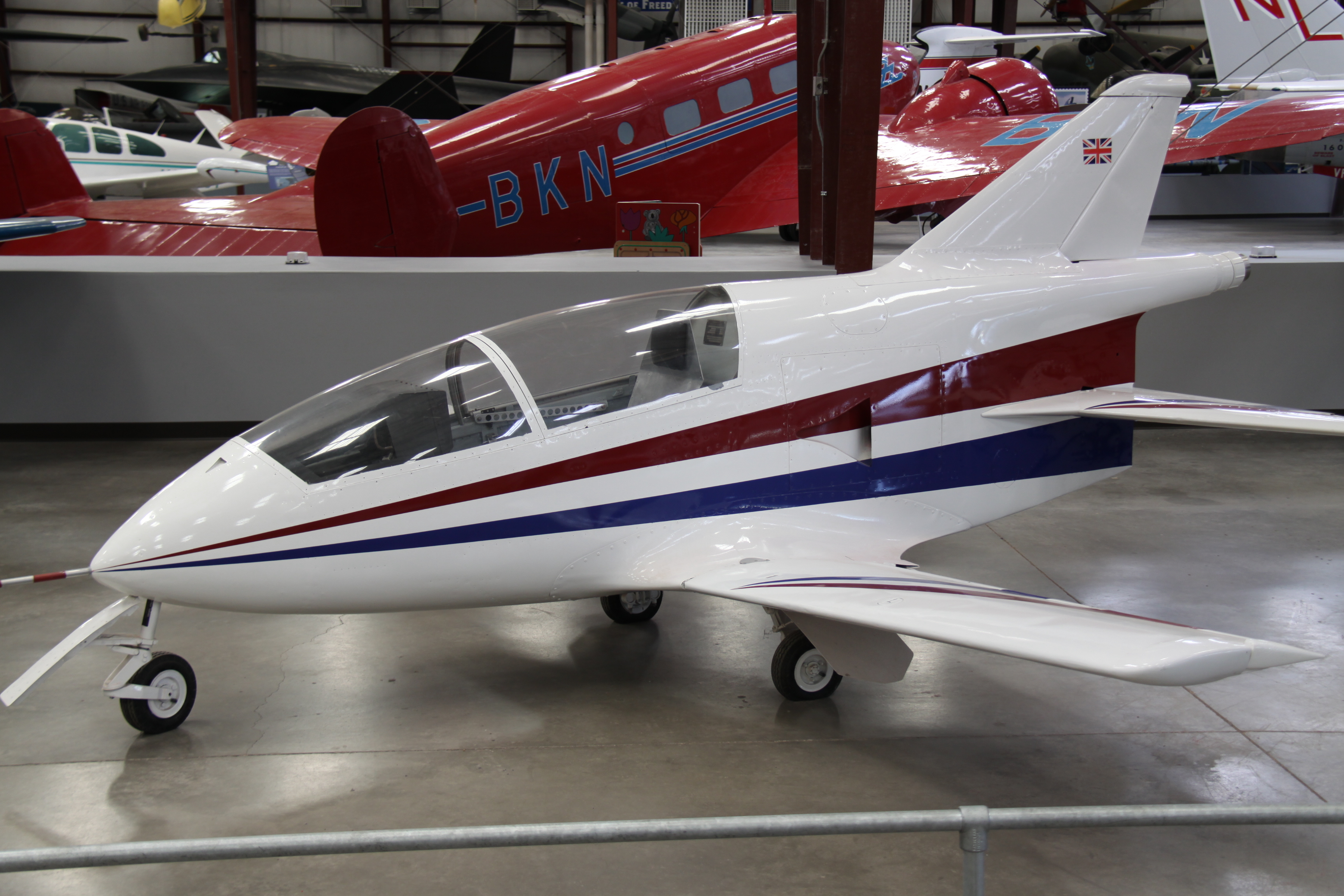
Bede BD-5J Micro

While the Xenoah engine was being tested, Bede decided to create an unconventional variant of the BD-5 with a small jet engine. The result was the BD-5J, a 300 mph (480 km/h) aircraft. The design used the Sermel TRS-18-046 turbojet (now Microturbo, a division of Turbomeca, in turn a division of Groupe Safran), which produced 225 lb of thrust. The original engines were produced under license by Ames Industrial in the United States.

An effort was made to interest Aeronca in producing the BD-5J commercially. A kit was shipped to Aeronca, but after assembling it, they declined – reportedly because it had too many problems, and too much risk, and was too difficult to build – and Aeronca returned the assembled craft to Bede.

Bob Bishop had purchased 20 BD-5J kits as soon as they had appeared, and many of the flying examples started life in this batch of twenty. A number have been involved in crashes, usually due to inadequate maintenance or insufficient training; however, in one case accident investigators concluded the pilot must have died before the crash.

The BD-5J was a popular airshow fixture, and Bishop logged more than 1,500 hours in his jets, which he now operates for military customers as a cruise missile surrogate. Throughout the 1980s until 1991, Coors flew two of them as the "Silver Bullets". Budweiser also briefly had a BD-5J, called the Bud Light Jet. The aircraft was lost after a fuel flow sensor burst in flight, causing a fire in the engine compartment. The pilot bailed out and was unharmed, but the aircraft was lost. It also appeared in the opening sequence of the James Bond film, Octopussy.

The last BD-5J that remained on the airshow circuit, Scott Manning's Stinger Jet, crashed on June 16, 2006, at Ottawa/Carp Airport, Canada, while practicing for an air show, killing Manning. June 2006 was a bad month for BD-5J's — an Acrojet Special BD-5J owned by Aerial Productions, Inc. impacted trees the morning of June 27 on final approach to the Ocean City Municipal Airport in Maryland, killing the experienced airshow pilot. The airplane was involved in radar testing as part of its services to the military as a cruise missile surrogate.

The BD-5J held the Guinness record for the World's Smallest Jet for over 25 years. Bob Bishop originally garnered the record with one of his jets, and in November 2004 the record changed hands to Juan Jiménez of San Juan, Puerto Rico, whose BD-5J weighed in 80 pounds (36 kg) lighter than Bishop's jet. The primary difference was the use of an earlier Microturbo turbojet, the simpler 022 Couguar, which weighed less.

== Bede Design ==
After Bede Aviation collapsed, Bede took on a number of engineering projects under Bede Design.

One of the first was a project with his cousin to produce the Bede Car, which used an 80 hp motorcycle engine driving a ducted fan for propulsion. Built primarily from fiberglass on aluminum, the car was to have weighed just under 1,000 pounds (450 kg), less than a third of a normal four-seater built of steel. The advantage to the design was a claimed 120 miles/gallon (2.0 L/100 km) fuel economy.

Bede Industries, his cousin's company, intended to introduce the car starting in 1982, but the prototype proved the infeasibility of the concept. The car lacked power at low speeds, so low that it could not even roll up an inclined driveway for parking without "gunning" it. There was some talk of adding electric motors for low speed operation and reversing, but it is not clear if these were fitted. The economy ratings also seemed hopelessly optimistic, based on fuel flow rates of the engine without the actual car. The fate of the prototype is unknown.

Another automobile project followed, this time a smaller motorcycle-like vehicle. The prototype was based on a production motorcycle, but "stretched" and surrounded with a fiberglass shell reminiscent of the BD-5. During its long gestation period it was known as the Autocycle or BD-200, and later as the LiteStar and Pulse. About 360 were produced and sold.

== Bede Jet ==
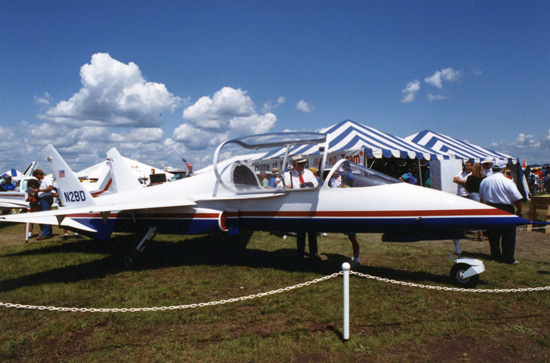
BD-10

Within weeks of the FTC Consent Decree expiring in 1989, Bede announced the design of a new two-seat high-speed jet, the Bede BD-10. The original idea appears to have come from a friend, Mike Van Wagenen. He formed a company specially for this project, Bede Jet at the Spirit of St. Louis Airport in Chesterfield, Missouri, just outside St. Louis.

Having learned from the BD-5 that using an untested engine was a bad idea, he selected the smallest production engine he could find in quantity, the General Electric J85, and designed an aircraft around it. The resulting design bore some resemblance to the Northrop T-38 Talon, which was powered by two examples of the same engine. Performance estimates were fantastic: after brake release the 1,580 pounds (720 kg) aircraft was claimed to be able to climb to 10,000 feet (3,000 m) in under 60 seconds, would cruise for 2,000 miles (3,200 km) at up to 45,000 ft (14,000 m) altitude in a 9 psi (465 mm Hg) pressurized cabin, and could reach supersonic speeds of up to Mach 1.4.

Bede's prototype was completed in 1992 and began testing, although it suffered from a number of minor teething problems. Over the design period the weight ballooned from 1,600 pounds (730 kg) to 2,800 pounds (1,300 kg) and fuel capacity had to be cut, dramatically reducing range from 2,000 miles (3,200 km) to a mere 400 to 500 (650 to 800 km). Speed was equally poor; even at full thrust the plane was barely transonic at Mach 0.83. It was sent to the Reno Air Races in 1994 to drum up sales, where it suffered from some wrinkling around the vertical stabilizers, indicating too much flex. A fix was designed, but by late in the year the project seems to have ground to a halt.

Van Wagenen had already planned to help kit buyers build the plane, and in December 1993 took over the civilian rights to the program, intending to sell completed versions (as opposed to kits) as the Fox 10. During testing of the first aircraft the vertical stabilizers broke off, killing Van Wagenen. Another example followed with a new owner at the controls, which suffered from a flap failure causing another deadly crash. All work at Fox, now known as Peregrine Flight International, ended. Meanwhile, Bede had sold the military rights to Monitor Jet of Canada, but nothing ever came of this. Bede Jet declared bankruptcy in 1997. The only other completed aircraft disintegrated in flight in 2003.

== Bede Aircraft, again ==
During the BD-10 project, Bede also started the design of updated BD-5's with two and four seats as the Bede BD-12 and Bede BD-14 respectively. They were designed under the reformed Bede Aircraft, also in Chesterfield.

Once again deposits were accepted and held in escrow in order to hold a "place in line" for kit delivery. The introductory price for orders placed before January 1995 was $18,900 with the smallest engine. Additionally Bede signed up dealers (reportedly at $250,000) who would help customers build their planes. A considerable amount of work was put into using the latest construction techniques in order to reduce construction time; the BD-12 consisted of only a few hundred parts in total. When built at one of the sites, it was claimed the plane could be completed and flown away in two weeks. Eventually, something on the order of 250 small deposits were received.

By early 1995 the BD-12 prototype had still not flown, and work on the BD-14 had not even started. That summer the almost-complete BD-12 was shipped to Oshkosh, where it generated some buzz. By this time the prototype ended up being seriously tail heavy, and in order to move the center of gravity back to a reasonable position for a test flight, 170 pounds (77 kg) of lead was added in the nose. The prototype finally flew in the fall of 1995, but was almost completely destroyed on its first flight due to marginal stability. The plane did not appear at the 1996 Oshkosh show, although it is still claimed the program is continuing.

Months later it became clear that Bede's company was once again in financial trouble. They were evicted from their hangar in Chesterfield, and moved to a new space in Alton, Illinois.

== BedeCorp ==
Bede re-formed a new design shop as BedeAmerica Aerosport. In 1998 he appeared at Oshkosh promoting a BD-16, a six-place version of the BD-4. However these plans apparently did not generate a lot of interest, and he moved on to the single-seat BD-17 Nugget and two-seat BD-18, both based on a layout similar to the original BD-1 but dramatically updated.

The BD-17 was first announced in 2000 and was even simpler than the BD-12, consisting of only 110 parts. It entered flight testing in 2003 and proved to have excellent flight qualities.

== Notes ==
Bede re-used naming on several occasions, which makes his designation system somewhat confusing. The BD-2 name was used twice, on both the experimental boundary layer control design (XBD-2) as well as the later powered glider. BD-7 was also used twice, once for the earlier aircraft based on the XBD-2, and later for the two-seat BD-5.

== Death ==
Bede died of an aneurysm on July 9, 2015, in Cleveland, Ohio, at age 82.
