= American General Aviation Corporation =

American General Aircraft Corporation, also known as AGAC, was an aircraft manufacturer based in Greenville, Mississippi, between the late 1980s and 1993.

The company was established in about 1988 to place the Gulfstream American AA-5B Tiger back in production. The Tiger had originally been produced by Grumman American and then later by Gulfstream American with production ending in 1979. The Tiger remained a popular aircraft amongst pilots and owners and American General sought to capitalize on that popularity with the production of new aircraft.

American General actually carried out a redesign of the Tiger, introducing many improvements over the older AA-5B, including a new split nose bowl that could be removed without removing the propeller, a new instrument panel, improved exterior lighting, a new fuel indication system, a 28 volt electrical system replacing the previous 12 volt system, a new style throttle quadrant and improvements to the heat and ventilation systems. These were enough changes that the FAA required an amended type certificate. This added to the time required to get the aircraft into production and the cost of doing so. The redesigned aircraft was known as the American General AG-5B Tiger.

The newly redesigned aircraft was well received by the civil aviation community. Many aircraft reviewers at that time wrote that the AG-5B was an evolutionary improvement over the previous production AA-5B Tigers and a worthy successor.

The company commenced production with the 1990 model year, building 13 production aircraft that year. 87 aircraft were produced in 1991 and 54 in 1992. The final year of production was 1992 when 24 were produced before the company closed its doors. Total AG-5B production at American General was 181, including prototypes.

Production of the AG-5B design was taken up again in 2001 by a new company, Tiger Aircraft.

== Aircraft by date ==
- American General AG-5B Tiger (1990)

== Related aircraft ==
- Bede BD-1
- AA-1
- AA-2
- AA-5
- GA-7
