= Piper PA-44 Seminole =

American twin-engined utility aircraft

PA-44 Seminole
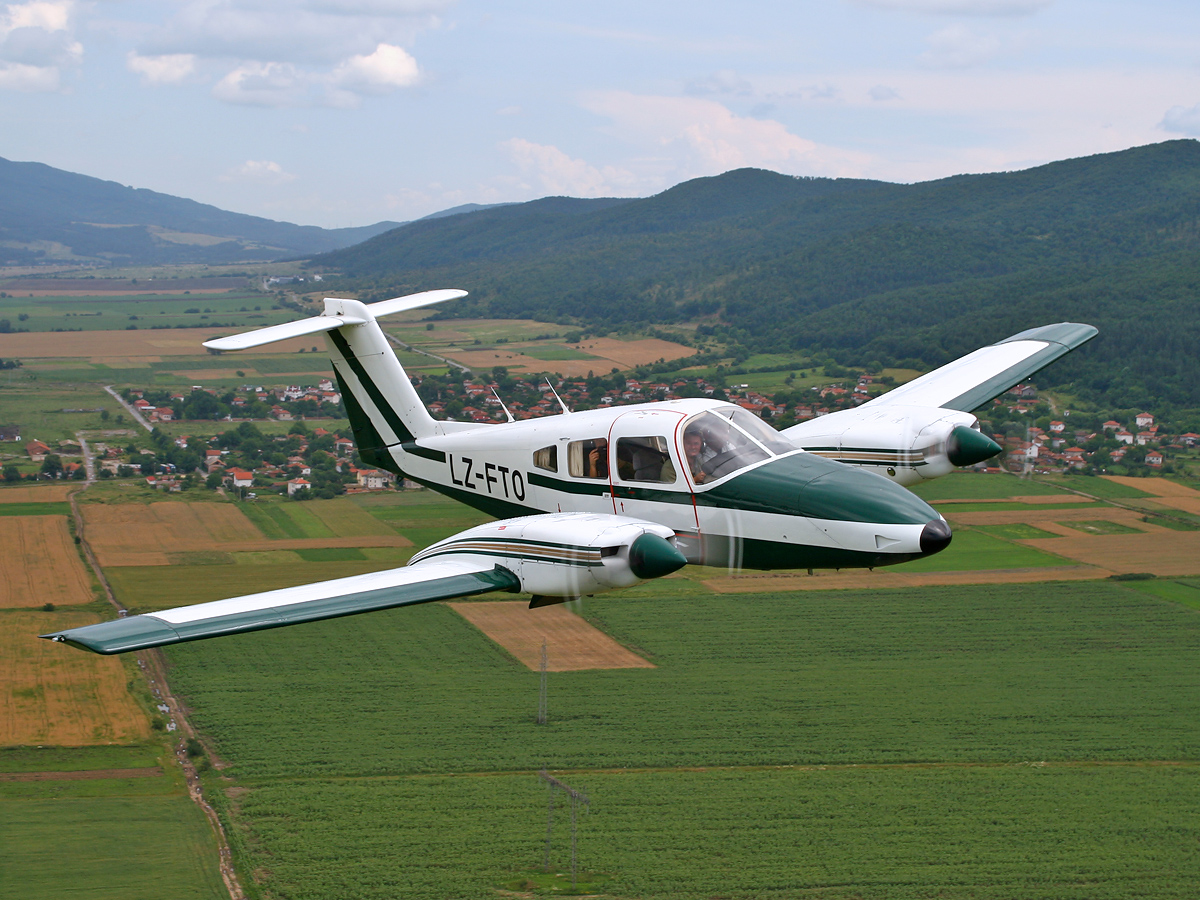

General information
- Type: Training and personal aircraft
- Manufacturer: Piper Aircraft
- Number built: 926 (until 2019)

History
- Manufactured: 1979–present
- First flight: May 1976
- Developed from: Piper Cherokee

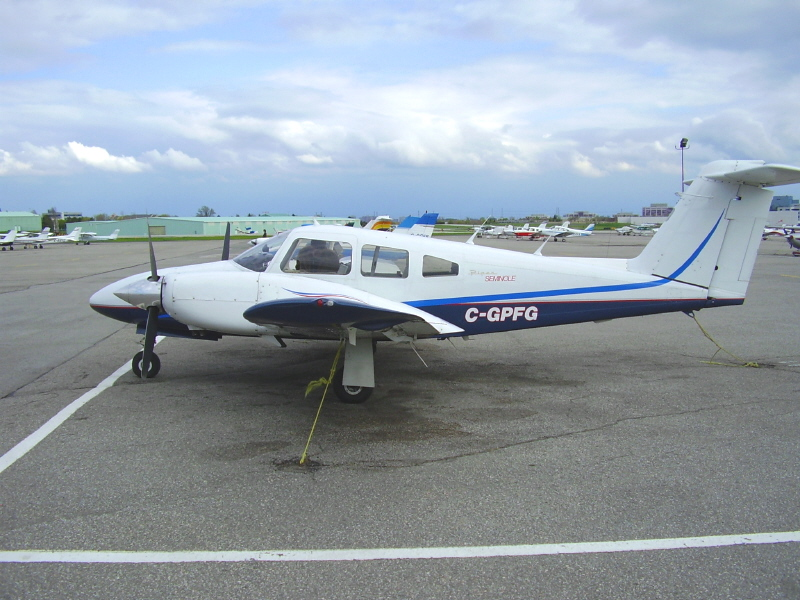
Piper PA-44-180 Seminole

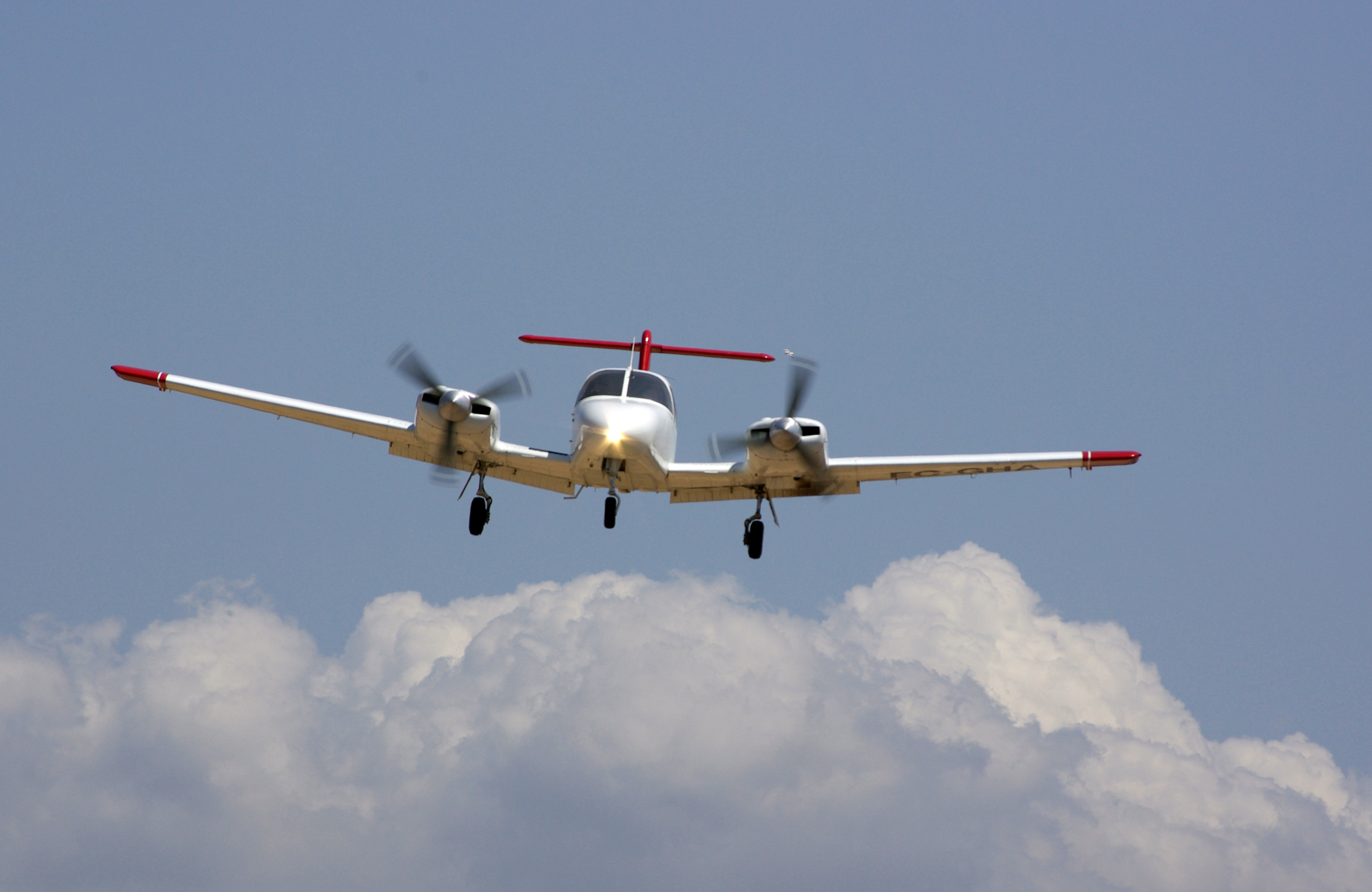
PA-44 landing

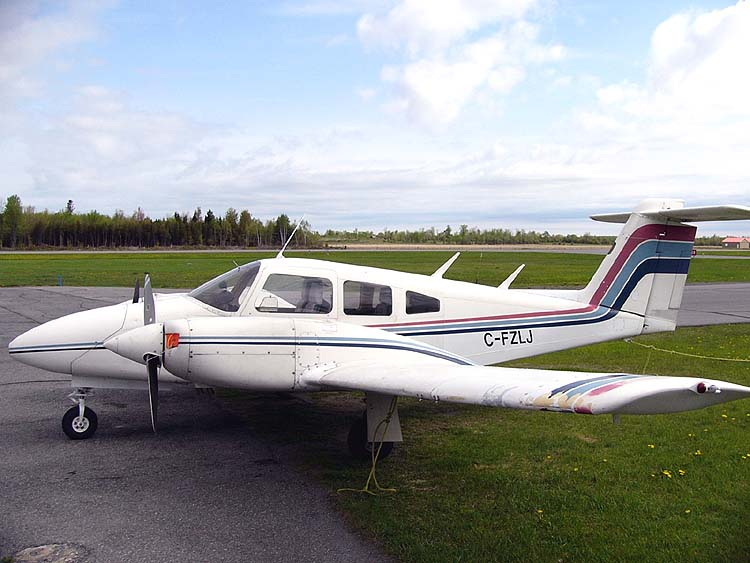
Piper PA-44-180 Seminole

The Piper PA-44 Seminole is a twin-engined light aircraft designed and manufactured by the American aviation company Piper Aircraft.

Developed from the single-engined Piper Cherokee, the Seminole first flew in May 1976 and was type certified on March 10, 1978, permitting it to enter service that same year. Possessing relatively predictable and favourable handling, the aircraft commonly marketed towards, and used for, multi-engined flight training. The initial model was quickly followed by the PA-44-180T Turbo Seminole, powered by turbocharged Lycoming TO-360-E1A6D engines and possessing improved high altitude performance. Another variant, the diesel-fuelled PA-44 Seminole DX, was under development in the 2020s. The Seminole has been built in three production runs; from 1979 to 1982, 1989 to 1990, and continuously since 1995.

== Development ==
The first prototype Seminole made its maiden flight in May 1976 and the type was publicly announced on February 21, 1978. It received its type certificate from the Federal Aviation Administration (FAA) on March 10, 1978, and was introduced as a 1979 model year in late 1978. Its gross weight is 3800 lbs (1723 kg).

The PA-44-180T Turbo Seminole was certified on November 29, 1979. This variant is powered by a pair of turbocharged Lycoming TO-360-E1A6D engines, capable of producing up to 180 hp (135 kW) and thus achieving a significant improvement in performance at high density altitude. The Turbo Seminole had its takeoff gross weight raised to 3,925 lb (1,780 kg), while the landing weight remained at 3,800 lbs (1,723 kg).

Production of both versions of the Seminole was terminated in 1982, by which point 361 Seminoles and 87 Turbo Seminoles had been completed. Production of the normally aspirated PA-44-180 was restarted in 1988. Changes were limited to modifications to the aircraft's electrical systems and instrumentation. Although the company intended to produce a batch of 100 aircraft, on account of Piper's financial problems, production of the type was stopped again in 1990, by which point only 29 more aircraft had been delivered. Following the company's recovery, production of the Seminole was again restarted in 1995. The 1,000th Seminole was completed in 2021.

== Design ==
The Piper PA-44 Seminole is a relatively compact and affordable twin-engined aircraft that was visually similar to the Beechcraft Duchess. The fuselage, T-tail, and wings are all derived from the Piper Arrow IV. In a typical configuration, it can seat up to four people, including the pilot, in a two-by-two arrangement. Aft of the rear seats is a small baggage compartment that can be accessed via its own door. Various avionics are commonly furnished on the Seminole, such as an autopilot/flight director. Other items that may be fitted include a Garmin-supplied GTX 330 transponder, Bendix weather radar, graphical engine monitors, four-place intercom, and uAvionix ADS-B apparatus.

One prominent feature of the Seminole is its relatively high T-tail; this arrangement places the horizontal stabilator above both the slipstream produced by the propeller and the downwash of the wing, resulting in smaller pitch changes when either the flaps or engine power are adjusted and in turn easing handling. A somewhat undesirable trait of the high T-tail configuration is that the elevators are only effective when the aircraft is flying above its VR speed. Overall, the aircraft's handing is largely predictable and favourable, which heavily contributed to the type being primarily used for multi-engined flight training.

Initial production Seminoles are powered by a pair of Lycoming O-360-E1A6D engines, each capable of producing up to 180 hp (135 kW). The right-hand engine is a Lycoming LO-360-E1A6D variant, which turns in the opposite direction to the left-hand engine; this arrangement eliminates the critical engine and makes the aircraft more controllable in the event that an engine needs to be shut down or fails. While not commonly fitted with a prop sycrophaser, manually syrncronising the engines is relatively straightforward. Later production Seminoles were built with Lycoming O-360-A1H6 engines. Each engine drives a twin-bladed Hartzell constant-speed propeller.

== Variants ==
PA-44-180 Seminole
Normally aspirated version powered by two Lycoming O-360-E1A6D or two O-360-A1H6 engines.
PA-44-180T Turbo Seminole
Turbocharged version powered by two Lycoming TO-360-E1A6D engines.
PA-44 Seminole DX
A diesel-powered variant equipped with two DeltaHawk DHK4A180 engines.

== Operators ==
=== Civil ===
The PA-44 is popular with air charter companies and flight schools, and is operated by private individuals and companies.

=== Military ===
Jordan

- Royal Jordanian Air Force

Peru

- Peruvian Air Force

== Specifications (PA-44-180 Seminole) ==
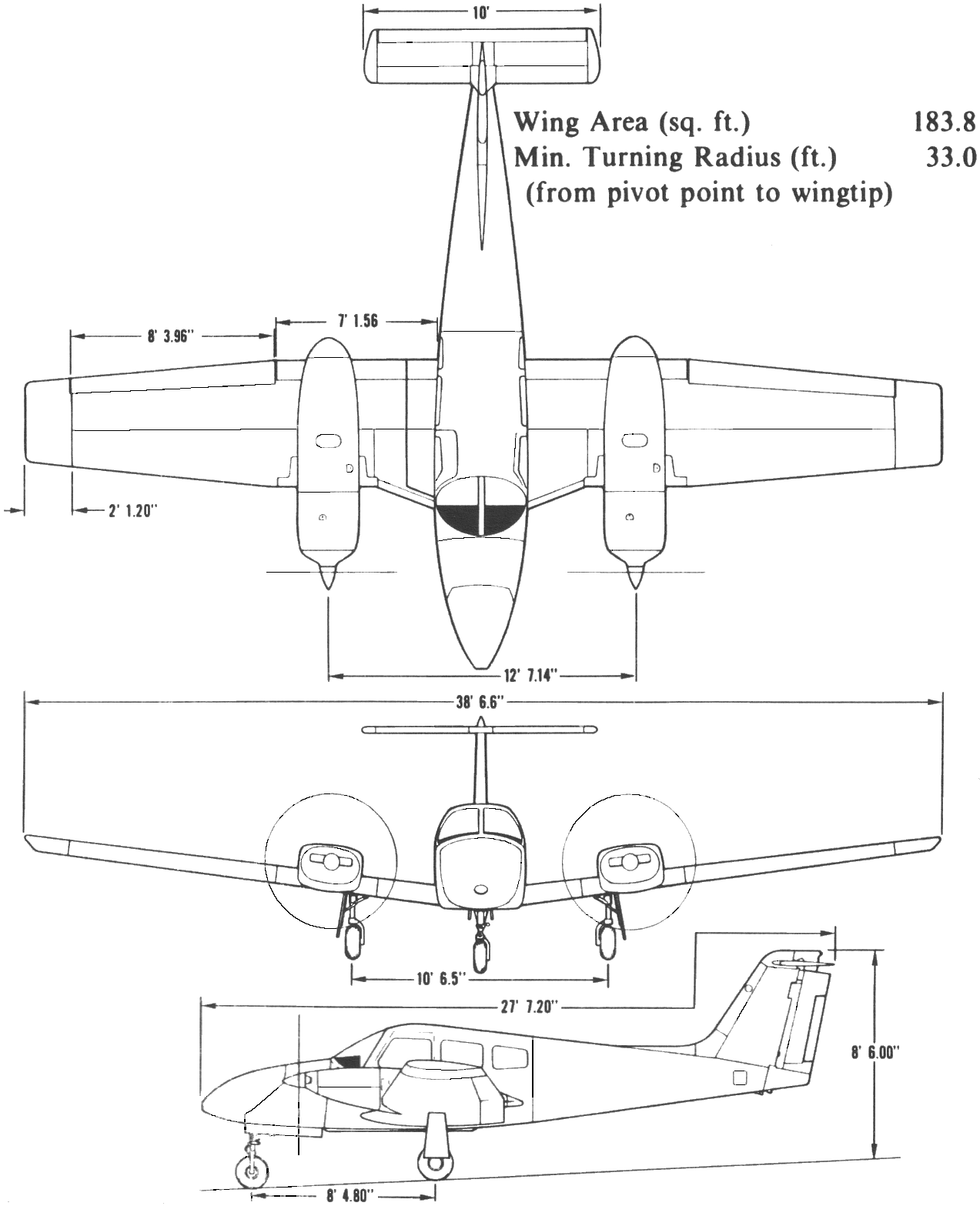
3-view line drawing of the Piper PA-44-180 Seminole

Data from Jane's All the World's Aircraft 1982–83

General characteristics

- Crew: 1
- Capacity: 3 passengers
- Length: 27 ft 7 1/4 in (8.41 m)
- Wingspan: 38 ft 7 1/4 in (11.77 m)
- Height: 8 ft 6 in (2.59 m)
- Wing area: 183.8 sq ft (17.08 m^{2})
- Airfoil: NACA 65_{2}-415
- Empty weight: 2,354 lb (1,068 kg)
- Max takeoff weight: 3,800 lb (1,724 kg)
- Fuel capacity: 110 US gal (92 imp gal; 420 L), of which 2 US gal (1.7 imp gal; 7.6 L) are unusable
- Powerplant: 2 × Lycoming O-360-E1A6 air-cooled flat four (counter rotating), 180 hp (130 kW) each
- Propellers: 2-bladed Hartzell fully-feathering metal constant-speed propellers, 6 ft 2 in (1.88 m) diameter

Performance

- Maximum speed: 193 mph (311 km/h, 168 kn)
- Cruise speed: 187 mph (301 km/h, 162 kn) (75% power)
- Stall speed: 68 mph (109 km/h, 59 kn) (flaps down) CAS
- Range: 1,053 mi (1,695 km, 915 nmi) (55% power)
- Service ceiling: 17,100 ft (5,200 m)
- Rate of climb: 1,340 ft/min (6.8 m/s)
- Single Engine Service Ceiling: 4,100 ft (1,200 m)
- Take-off to 50 ft (15 m): 1,400 ft (430 m)
- Landing from 50 ft (15 m): 1,190 ft (360 m)

== See also ==
Related development

- Piper Cherokee

Aircraft of comparable role, configuration, and era

- Beechcraft Duchess
- Gulfstream American GA-7 Cougar
