= BD-1 =

BD-1 may refer to:

- Bede BD-1, a small aircraft
- Agent Starr, a character in the 2006 rhythm video game Elite Beat Agents
- BD-1, a BD unit exploration droid and the main character in the 2019 video game Star Wars Jedi: Fallen Order
