= GA7 =

GA7 may refer to:

- Georgia's 7th congressional district, a congressional district in the U.S. state of Georgia
- Georgia State Route 7, a state highway in the eastern part of the state
- GA7, gibberellin A7, a form of the gibberellin plant hormone
- Gulfstream American GA-7 Cougar, an American light aircraft
