= Grumman Tiger =

Grumman Tiger may refer to:

- Grumman F-11 Tiger
- Grumman American AA-5 Tiger
