= AA2 =

AA2 or AA-2 may refer to:

- Vympel K-13 missile, known as the AA-2 Atoll in NATO terminology
- USS T-2 (SS-60/SF-2), an AA-1-class submarine in the service of the US Navy, was first known as USS AA-2
- American Aviation AA-2 Patriot, a light aircraft
- Phoenix Wright: Ace Attorney − Justice for All, the second video game of the series
- America's Army 2, the second video game of the series
- The Egyptian hieroglyph representing a pustule (code "AA2")
- Aa2, the third highest credit rating given by Moody's Investors Service
- Ascent Abort-2, a 2019 flight test of the launch abort system of NASA's Orion spacecraft
