= Delta D2 =

Australian helicopter

D2

General information
- Type: Helicopter
- National origin: Australia
- Manufacturer: Delta Helicopters
- Status: Under development (2011)
- Number built: at least one prototype

History
- Introduction date: 2009

The Delta D2 is an Australian diesel-powered helicopter, under development by Delta Helicopters of Tanah Merah, Queensland. The aircraft was publicly introduced in 2009 and is intended to be supplied as a kit for amateur construction.

By January 2013, the Delta Helicopters website was no longer available on the internet and it is likely the company has gone out of business.

== Design and development ==
The D2 features a single three-bladed main rotor, a two-seats-in side-by-side configuration enclosed cockpit with a windshield, skid-type landing gear and a four-cylinder, air-cooled, two-stroke, turbocharged 180 hp (134 kW) DeltaHawk DH180 diesel engine made by DeltaHawk Engines, Inc.

The aircraft fuselage is made from welded steel tubing and covered in a composite fairing. Further details about the design have not been released.

== Specifications (D2) ==
Data from Bayerl

General characteristics

- Crew: one
- Capacity: one passenger
- Powerplant: 1 × DeltaHawk DH180 four-cylinder, air-cooled, four stroke turbocharged diesel engine, 130 kW (180 hp)

== See also ==
- DF Helicopters DF334
- Dynali H2S
- Heli-Sport CH-7
