= Anti-stall =

Anti-stall can refer to:

- Anti-stall (engine), a device preventing the stalling of an engine
- Anti-stall (aeroplane controls), a system designed to prevent an aircraft from stalling

== See also ==
- Anti-stall strakes, leading-edge slots or extensions, and stall strips; in fluid and aerodynamics, extensions that postpone aerodynamic stall
- Anti-stall parachute, a type of drogue parachute sometimes used as an anti-stall or stall recovery parachute
- Compressor anti-stall system, a compressor bleed system that prevents compressor stalling
