= American Aviation =

American aircraft manufacturer

American Aviation Corporation
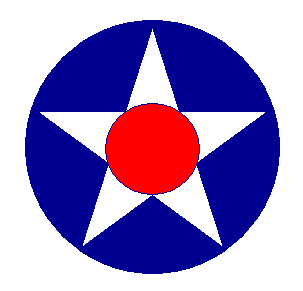

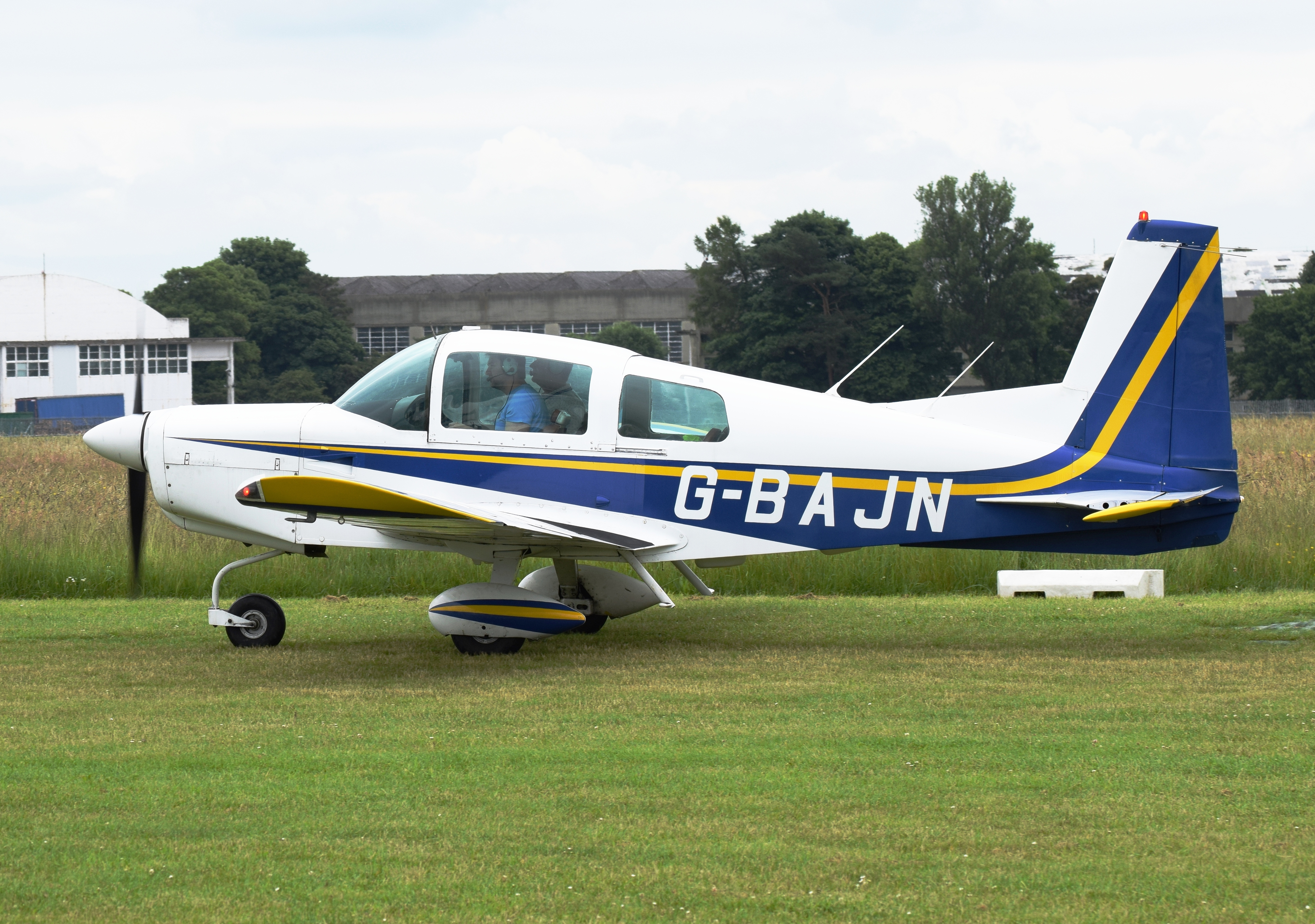
- Grumman American AA-5 Traveler at Cotswold Airport, Gloucestershire, England in 2016
- Industry: Aerospace
- Founded: 1964; 62 years ago
- Fate: Merged with Grumman in 1972
- Successor: Grumman American

American Aviation Corporation was an American aircraft manufacturer based in Cleveland, Ohio, in the 1960s, which produced light single-engine aircraft. In 1972, it became the Grumman American Aviation Corporation.

== History ==
The company was formed in 1964 to build a production version of the Bede BD-1, a two-seat light aircraft designed and built by Jim Bede and first flown on July 11, 1963.

During the development of the BD-1 there was conflict between Bede and the other shareholders, and in 1965, Bede was removed from the company. Attorney and former Marine fighter pilot Russ Meyer became the new company president at age 34.

The BD-1 was re-designed for production with a lengthened fuselage, greater wingspan and larger engine, the company also introduced metal-to-metal bonding of components, a new technique in general aviation. The new aircraft was named the AA-1 Yankee and first flew on March 2, 1967, gaining type certificate approval from the FAA in July 1968.

The Grumman Corporation had taken an 80% share in American Aviation and in 1972 the company was renamed the Grumman American Aviation Corporation.

== Aircraft ==
Model name	First flight	Number built	Type
American Aviation AA-1 Yankee Clipper & AA-1A Trainer	1967	1,820	Two-seat general aviation aircraft
American Aviation AA-2 Patriot	1970	2	Four-seat general aviation aircraft
American Aviation AA-5 Traveler	1971	3,282	Four-seat general aviation aircraft
