= DeltaHawk DH160 =

American aircraft engine

DH160
- Type: Aircraft engine
- National origin: United States
- Manufacturer: DeltaHawk Engines, Inc.

The DeltaHawk DH160 is an American aircraft engine, under development by DeltaHawk Engines, Inc. of Racine, Wisconsin and intended for use in light aircraft.

== Design and development ==
The engine is a V4, two-stroke, liquid-cooled, direct-drive, diesel engine design, which is intended to produce 160 hp (120 kW).

The company intended to complete Federal Aviation Administration type certification during 2015, but did not achieve their goal.

== Specifications (DH160) ==
Data from World Directory of Leisure Aviation 2011-2012

=== General characteristics ===
- Type: V4, two-stroke, diesel aircraft engine
- Dry weight: 148 kg (326.3 lb)

=== Components ===
- Fuel type: Diesel fuel
- Cooling system: liquid

=== Performance ===
- Power output: 160 hp (120 kW)
- Compression ratio: 22:1

== See also ==
Related development

- DeltaHawk DH180

Related lists

- List of aircraft engines
