= Beechcraft Duchess =

American light twin-engined airplane

Model 76 Duchess
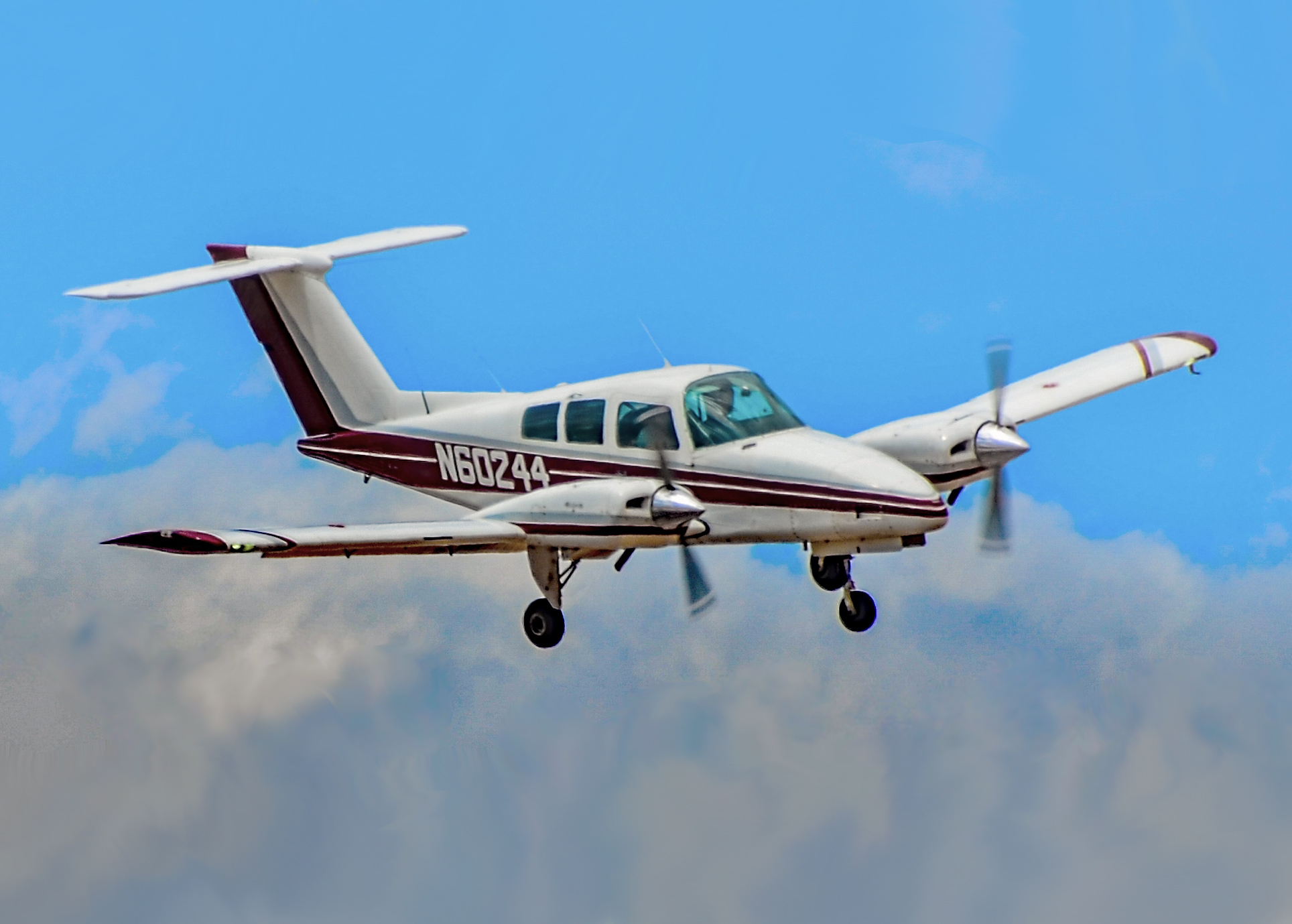
- A Beech 76 Duchess on final approach

General information
- Type: Four-seat cabin monoplane
- Manufacturer: Beechcraft
- Primary user: Flight schools
- Number built: 437

History
- Manufactured: 1978-1983
- Introduction date: 1978
- First flight: September 1974
- Developed from: Beechcraft Sierra

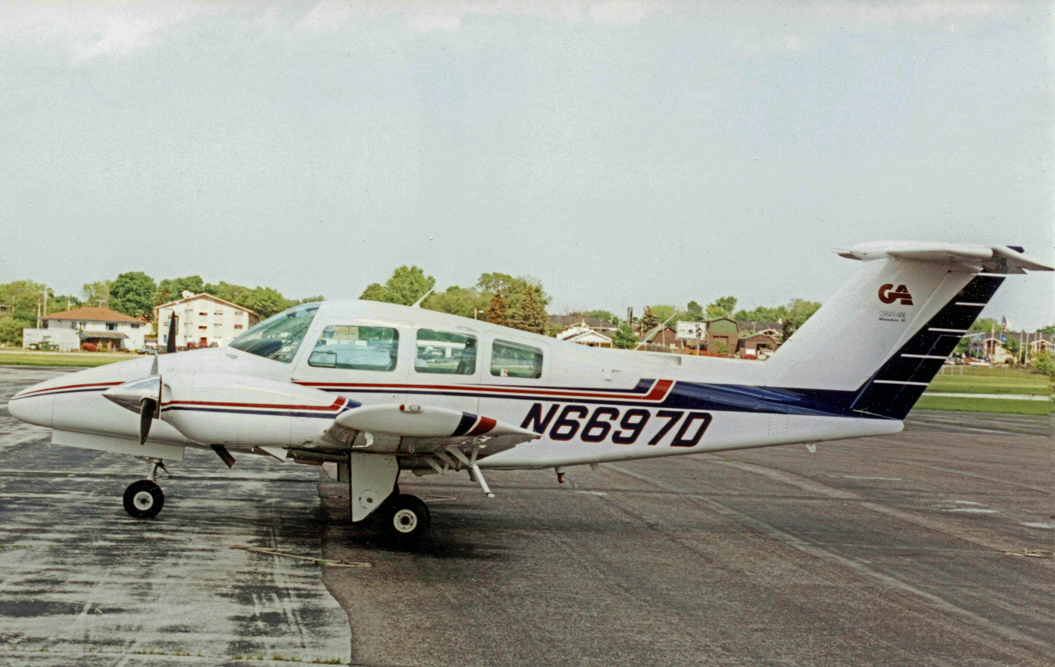
US registered 1979 model Duchess

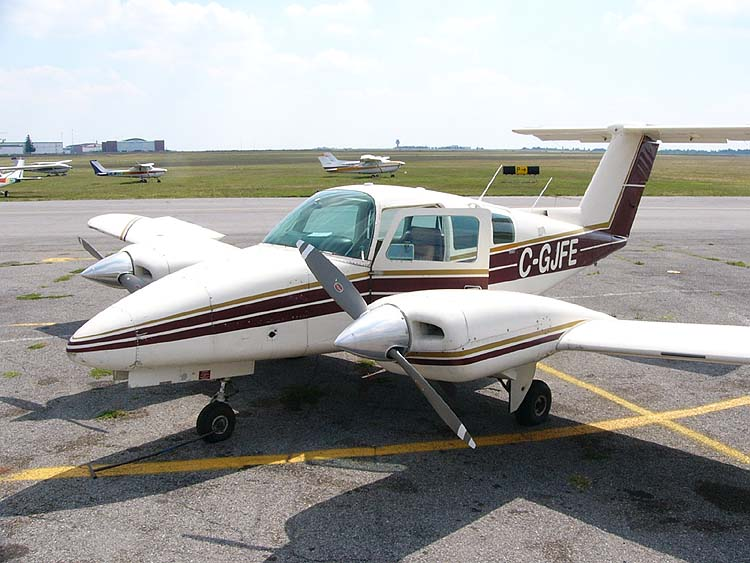
1979 model Duchess

The Beechcraft Model 76 Duchess is an American twin-engined monoplane built by Beechcraft intended partly as a low cost introduction to twin-engine aircraft.

== Development ==
Developed as Model PD289 (Preliminary Design 289), the prototype was unveiled on November 4, 1974, although it had first flown in September 1974. The Model 76 was designed as an economical twin-engine trainer for the Beech Aero Centers and to compete with the similar Gulfstream Cougar as well as the Cessna 310.

The first production version flew on 24 May 1977, and the name "Duchess" was chosen through a company competition. Construction of the Duchess was set for a new factory built at the Liberal Division, with deliveries beginning early in 1978.

Production of the Duchess continued until 1983, with no significant changes. A single example was tested with turbocharged engines in 1979, but did not proceed to production.

== Design ==
The Duchess is an all-metal low-wing monoplane with retractable tricycle landing gear and a T-tail. It seats four. The design used components and the bonded wing construction from Beechcraft's single-engined Musketeer line. The basic fuselage and wing structure was adapted from the Model 24 Sierra, a Musketeer variant with retractable landing gear, but the Sierra wing spar was redesigned to support the added weight of the engines. Nose landing gear from the A36 Bonanza was used.

The Model 76 incorporates right and left "handed" Lycoming O-360 engines that rotate in opposing directions to eliminate the critical engine during single engine operation.

In 1979, a single example was converted to test the turbocharged versions of the engine. The cowlings were reshaped and the exhaust moved to accommodate the aft-mounted turbochargers.

The Duchess wing is of aluminum honeycomb construction fastened by bonding, rather than rivets, to reduce cost and produce a smoother aerodynamic surface.

=== T-tail ===
The use of a T-tail on the Model 76 met with mixed critical reception when the aircraft was introduced. Plane & Pilot pronounced: "Outstanding design characteristics of the new Duchess include an aerodynamically advantageous T-tail, which places the horizontal surfaces above the propeller slipstream for better stability and handling.", while Gerald Foster said: "[Beechcraft's] interest in T-tails was perhaps an affectation triggered by their wide use on jet airliners". AVweb wrote that Beechcraft adopted the T-tail after flight tests revealed that the initially used conventional horizontal stabilizer was too small and suffered from buffeting problems, increasing noise and vibration during flight; moving the horizontal stabilizer out of the propeller slipstream eliminated the buffeting and the need for enlargement while adding only 15 pounds (6.8 kg) of weight. Additionally, the T-tail design moved the stabilizer rearward, increasing its effectiveness and giving the aircraft a broader center of gravity range. The later Piper Seminole also adopted a T-tail.

== Variants ==
Model 76 Duchess
Four-seat, twin-engine (Lycoming O-360), low-winged trainer with bonded aluminum construction.
Model 76TC Duchess
Unofficial designation for single test aircraft using turbocharged Lycoming O-360.

== Operators ==
The aircraft remains popular with flight training schools.

- Beechcraft - Tested one Duchess to investigate its spin recovery characteristics in conjunction with NASA.
- National Test Pilot School - Operates one Duchess.
- Purdue University - Uses a Duchess modified with air sampling equipment as Airborne Laboratory Atmospheric Research (ALAR).
- Scaled Composites - Uses one Duchess as a test aircraft.

== Specifications ==
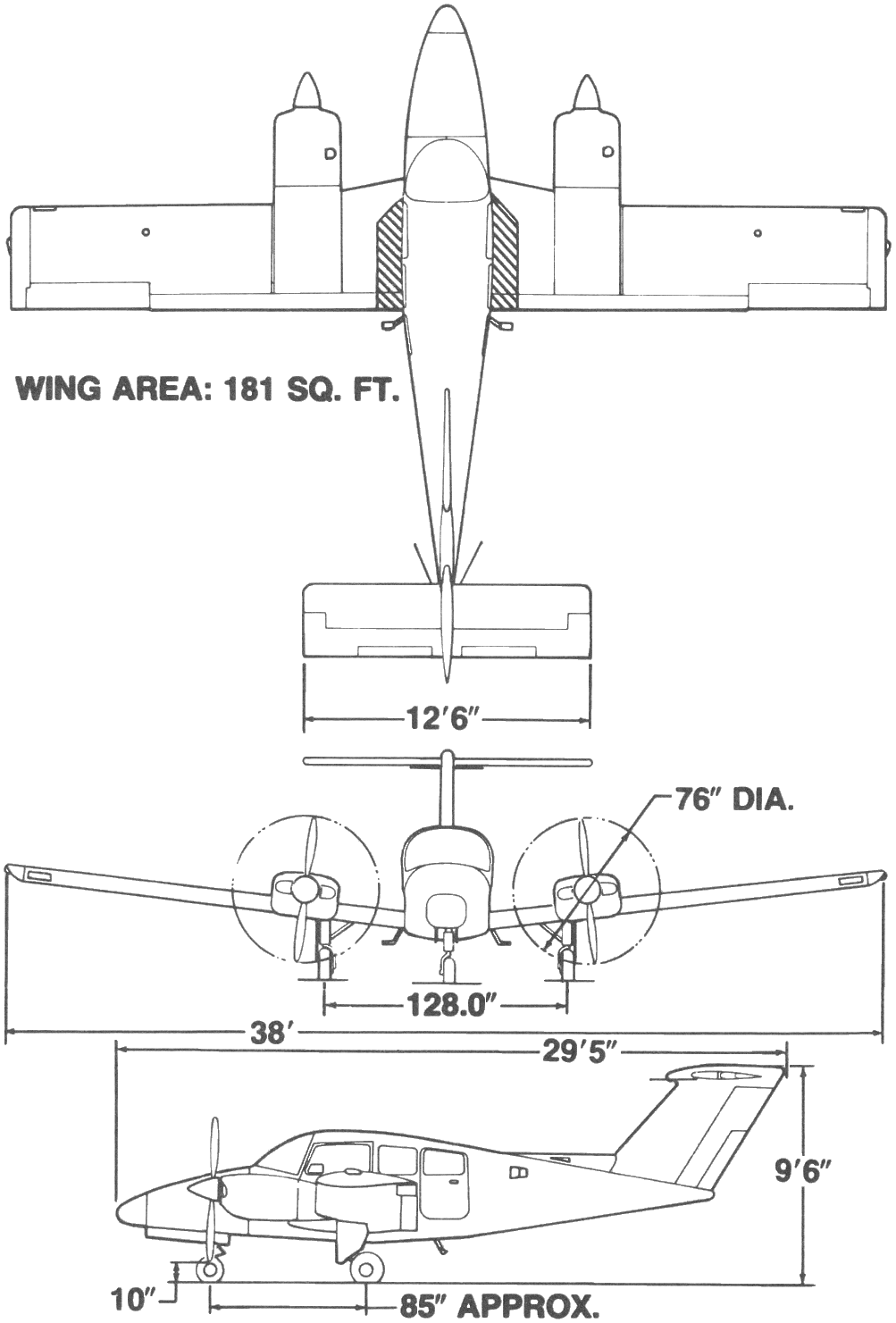
3-view line drawing of the Beechcraft 76 Duchess

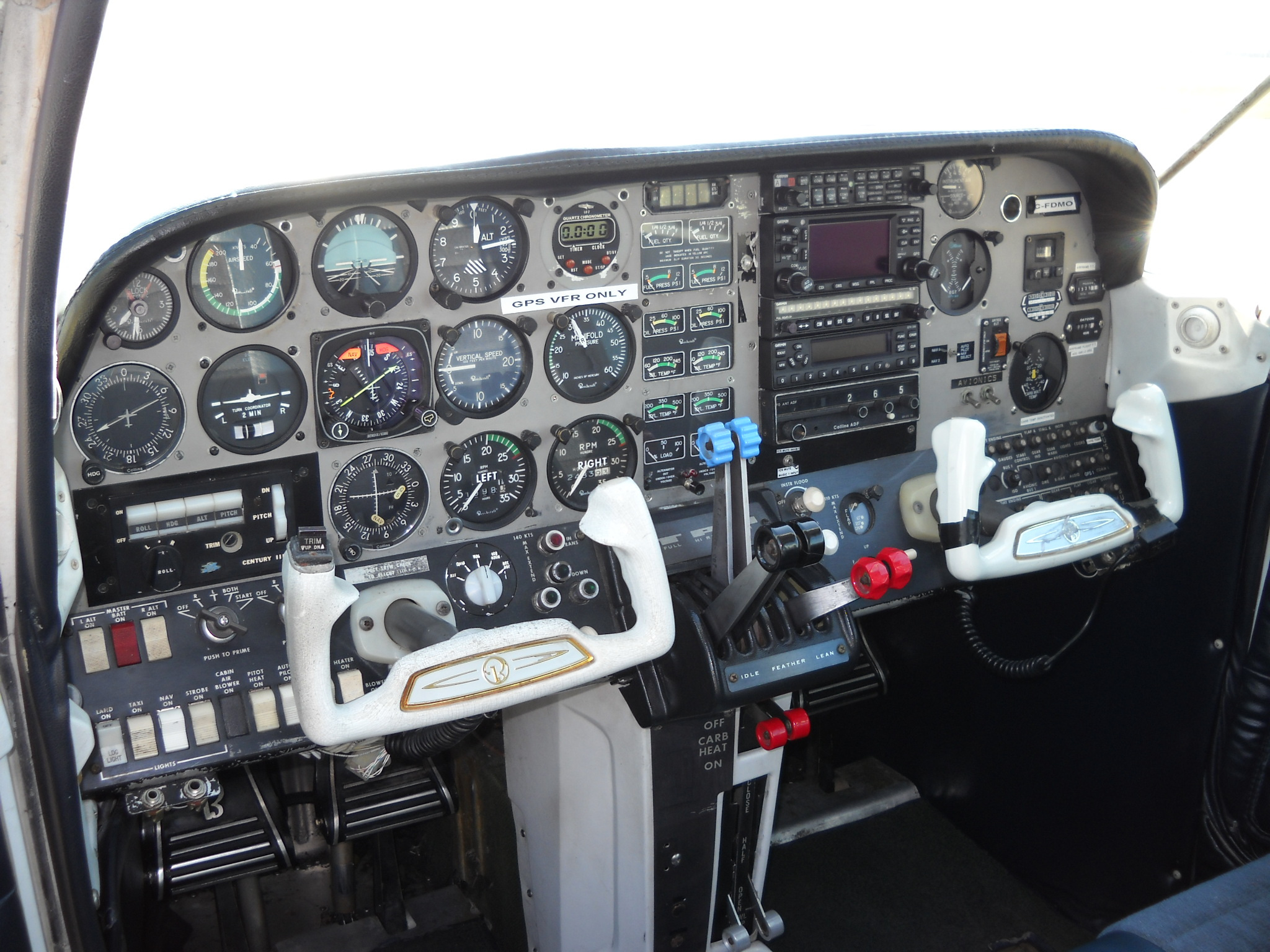
1976 model Duchess instrument panel

Data from Jane's All The World's Aircraft 1980–81.

General characteristics

- Crew: 1
- Capacity: 3 passengers
- Length: 29 ft 0 1/2 in (8.85 m)
- Wingspan: 38 ft 0 in (11.58 m)
- Height: 9 ft 6 in (2.90 m)
- Wing area: 181 sq ft (16.8 m^{2})
- Aspect ratio: 7.973:1
- Airfoil: NACA 63_{2}A415
- Empty weight: 2,460 lb (1,116 kg)
- Max takeoff weight: 3,900 lb (1,769 kg)
- Fuel capacity: 100 US gal (83 imp gal; 380 L)
- Powerplant: 2 × Lycoming O-360-A1G6D air-cooled flat-four engines, 180 hp (130 kW) each
- Propellers: 2-bladed Hartzell HC-M2YR-2C(L)EUF/F(J)C 7666A constant speed propellers

Performance

- Cruise speed: 158 kn (182 mph, 293 km/h) at 10,000 ft (3,000 m)
- Stall speed: 60 kn (69 mph, 110 km/h) power off, flaps down, IAS
- Never exceed speed: 171 kn (197 mph, 317 km/h)
- Range: 780 nmi (900 mi, 1,440 km) at 12,000 ft (3,700 m), econ cruise
- Service ceiling: 19,650 ft (5,990 m)
- Rate of climb: 1,248 ft/min (6.34 m/s)

== See also ==
Related development

- Beechcraft Musketeer

Aircraft of comparable role, configuration, and era

- Cessna 310
- Gulfstream American GA-7 Cougar
- Piper Seminole
