= Grumman American AA-5 =

Family of light single engine aircraft

AA-5/AG-5 series
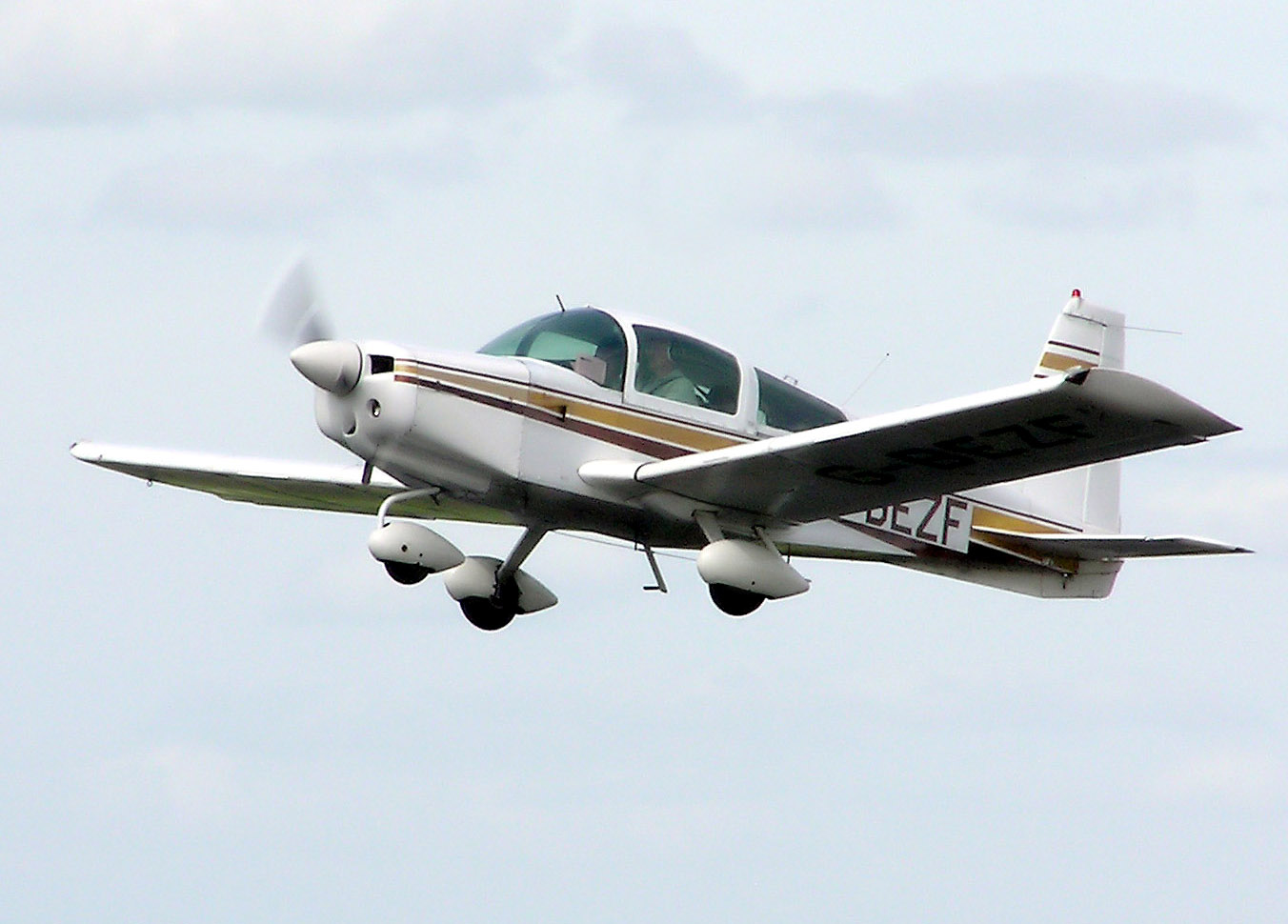
- Grumman American AA-5 Traveller

General information
- Type: Four-seat cabin monoplane
- National origin: United States
- Manufacturer: American Aviation; Grumman American; Gulfstream American; American General Aviation Corporation; Tiger Aircraft
- Number built: 3,282

History
- Manufactured: 1971–2006
- Introduction date: December 1971
- First flight: August 21, 1970

The Grumman American AA-5 series is a family of American all-metal, four-seat, light aircraft used for touring and training. The line includes the original American Aviation AA-5 Traveler, the Grumman American AA-5 Traveler, AA-5A Cheetah, and AA-5B Tiger, the Gulfstream American AA-5A Cheetah and AA-5B Tiger, the American General AG-5B Tiger, and the Tiger Aircraft AG-5B Tiger.

== Development ==
Following American Aviation's success with the AA-1 Yankee Clipper two-seat light aircraft in 1969, the company decided to produce a four-seat aircraft. They started with a new "clean-sheet" design that was designated the American Aviation AA-2 Patriot. The AA-2 design did not meet its performance goals during test-flying and only one was ever built.

Still needing a four-seat aircraft to fill its product line, the company simply enlarged the external and cabin dimensions of the AA-1 Yankee to create the four-seater. This decision capitalized on the marketplace identification of the Yankee and its derivative the AA-1A Trainer and also resulted in 2/3 parts commonality between the designs, saving development time and production costs.

=== AA-5 Traveler ===
The new four-place aircraft, named the American Aviation AA-5 Traveler, was powered by a Lycoming O-320-E2G engine of 150 hp (110 kW). It would carry four people at 121 knots (224 km/h) cruise speed and was certified under US FAR Part 23.

Production of the Traveler had just started in 1971 when American Aviation was sold to Grumman in 1973, and became the Grumman American division. Grumman continued production of the Traveler. 834 Travelers had been produced when production of this model ceased in 1975.

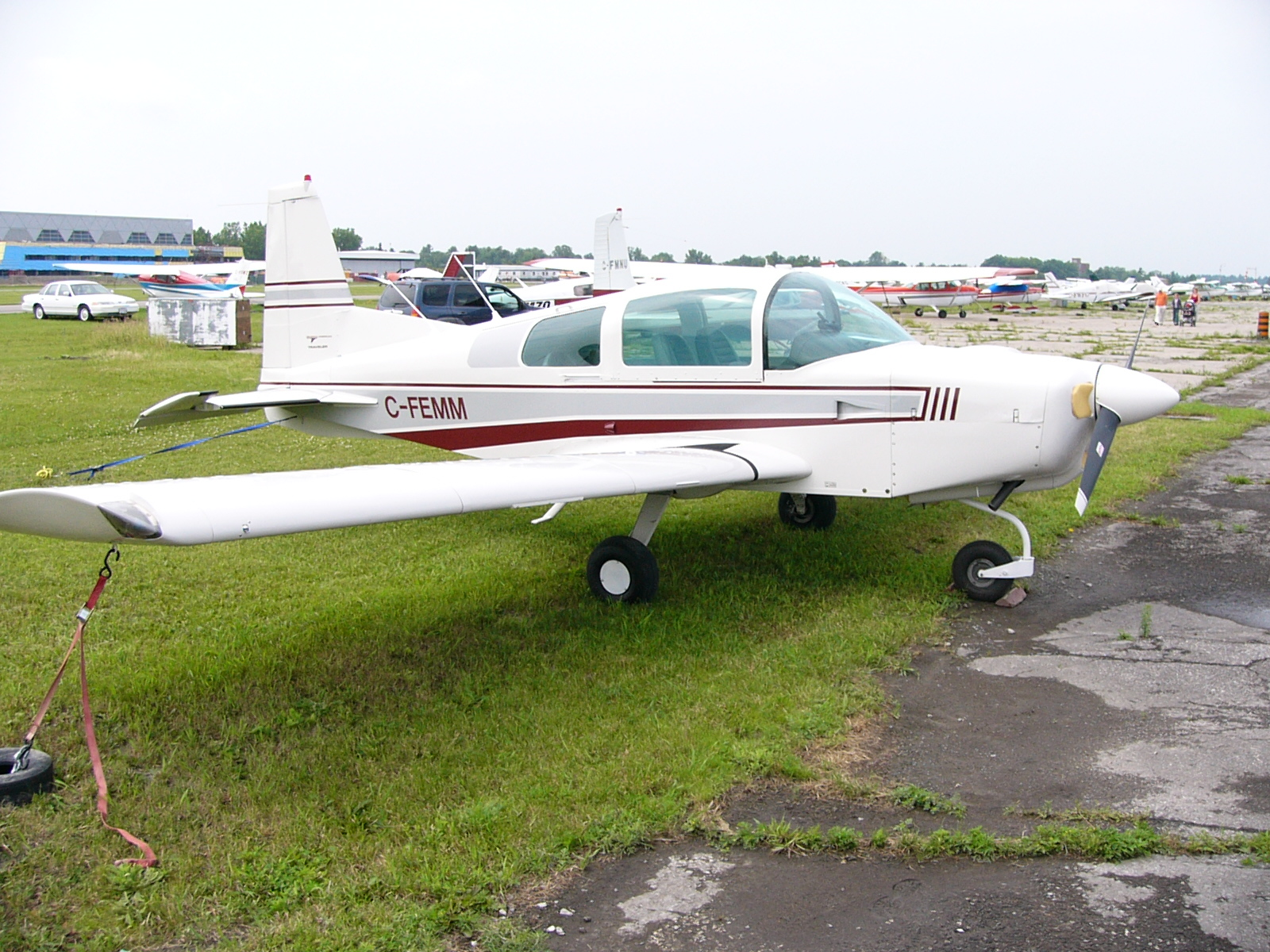
Grumman American AA-5 Traveler

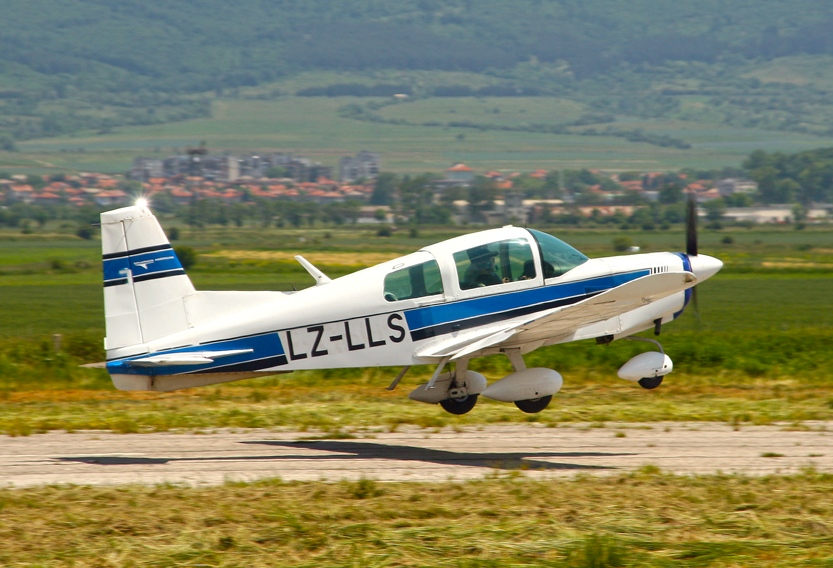
Grumman American AA-5 Traveler

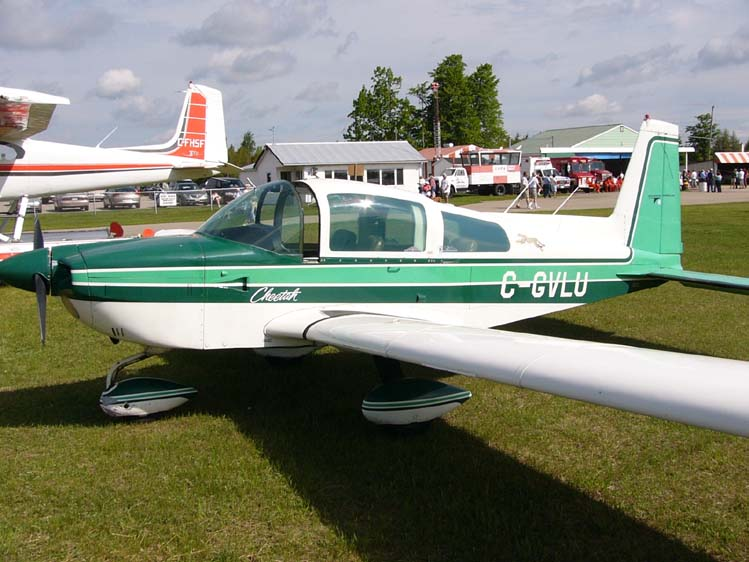
Grumman American AA-5A Cheetah

The Grumman American AA-5A Cheetah "leaping cheetah" emblem that differentiated the AA-5A from the earlier AA-5 Traveler

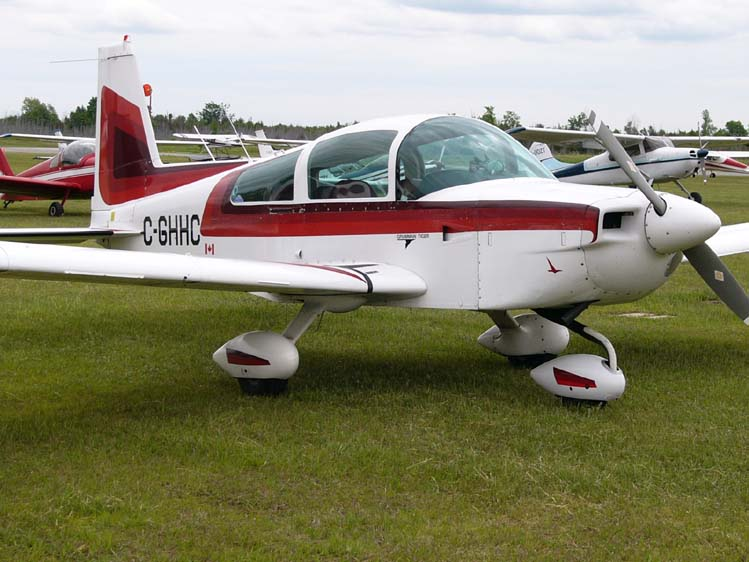
Grumman American AA-5B Tiger

The Grumman American "Galloping Tiger" emblem adopted to differentiate the AA-5B Tiger from earlier AA-5 models

A redesign of the AA-5 was undertaken in 1974, with the resulting 1975 model Traveler featuring an aerodynamic cleanup of the engine cowling and main landing gear fairings. The tail section remained unchanged. As a result of these changes the 1975 Traveler had a cruise speed of 127 knots (235 km/h). The Traveler was superseded in production the following year by the further refined AA-5A Cheetah.

=== AA-5A Cheetah ===
Grumman's engineers felt that the AA-5 design had more speed potential than the original Traveler, even with its 1975 improvements, and so embarked on an aerodynamic cleanup and redesign. Changes were made to the engine cowling and baffling to reduce cooling drag, the exhaust system was redesigned, the main landing gear fairings were further improved, the ventral fin was eliminated, and the horizontal tail was enlarged to allow a larger center of gravity range. Fuel capacity was increased from the Traveler's 37 US gallons to 52 gallons, with optional long range tanks, thus increasing its range.

The new variant was named the AA-5A Cheetah and was introduced as a 1976 model in late 1975. In keeping with its namesake it was six knots (seven mph) faster than the Traveler with the same 150 hp (110 kW) Lycoming O-320-E2G powerplant. Because the Cheetah looked very much like the Traveler externally, Grumman's marketing department created a "leaping cheetah" emblem to differentiate it from the earlier AA-5.

Grumman sold its light aircraft division to Gulfstream Aerospace in 1978 and the division was renamed Gulfstream American. Gulfstream continued production of the AA-5A until 1979. A total of 900 Cheetahs were produced.

=== AA-5B Tiger ===
The final variant of the AA-5 line was the AA-5B Tiger. The Tiger was designed by Grumman engineers and was first produced in late 1974 as the 1975 model.

The Tiger was the outcome of the same redesign work on the AA-5 Traveler that resulted in the 150 hp (110 kW) Cheetah and it was originally little more than the same aircraft with a Lycoming O-360-A4K 180 hp (130 kW) engine, resulting in a 139-knot (257 km/h) cruise speed. Gross weight was increased from the AA-5/AA-5A's 2,200 lb (1,000 kg) to 2,400 lb (1,100 kg) on the Tiger. Externally the Tiger looked much like the AA-5 Traveler and AA-5A Cheetah so once again Grumman's marketing department came up with a distinctive decal package to differentiate the design – this time a "galloping tiger".

While the earlier AA-1s and AA-5s did not change much from year to year the AA-5B Tiger underwent almost continual improvement. As with the AA-5A, the AA-5B was continued in production by Gulfstream when they purchased Grumman's American division. Gulfstream ceased production of all piston-engined aircraft in 1979 and the highly successful Tiger design went out of production after 1323 aircraft had been delivered.

=== AG-5B Tiger ===
For eleven years the design was not produced and then in the late 1980s a new company was formed to produce the Tiger. American General Aviation Corporation carried out further design improvements including introducing a new split nose cowling (engine cover) that could be removed without removing the propeller, a new instrument panel, improved exterior lighting, a new fuel quantity indication system, a 28 volt electrical system replacing the older 14 volt system, a new-style throttle quadrant, and improvements to the heat and ventilation systems. Aerodynamic improvements raised the optimal altitude cruise speed from 139 knots (257 km/h) true airspeed to 143 knots (265 km/h) TAS. The redesigned aircraft was put into production under an amended type certificate as the American General AG-5B Tiger. The new company had considered producing AA-1s and AA-5A Cheetahs, but those plans were never fulfilled before it closed its doors in 1993. American General produced Tigers for model years 1990–93 and delivered 181 aircraft in that time.

The design has a strong following among pilots and aircraft owners and so, in 1999, a new company was formed to put the Tiger back into production. Tiger Aircraft started production of the AG-5B Tiger in 2001 at their plant in Martinsburg, West Virginia. Tiger Aircraft did not produce any other models of the AA-1 or AA-5 family, although they owned the type certificates for the complete line of aircraft. Between 2001 and 2006 Tiger Aircraft produced 51 AG-5Bs. By the middle of 2006 Tiger Aircraft was experiencing financial problems and production of AG-5Bs had been halted and production workers laid off. Tiger Aircraft filed for bankruptcy in January 2007.

On August 2, 2007, the Federal Bankruptcy Court approved the sale of Tiger Aircraft assets to True Flight Holdings LLC. True Flight has indicated its intention to produce parts and also return the AG-5B Tiger to production as soon as possible at a planned 60,000-square-foot (5,600 m^{2}) facility on a 13-acre (53,000 m^{2}) lot at the Valdosta, Georgia, Airport, but as of 2021 had not produced any complete aircraft.

=== AA-5 & AG-5 production ===
All told, 3,289 AA-5s and AG-5s were produced by the five manufacturers between 1971 and 2005.

== Design ==
All models of the AA-5 have four seats under a sliding canopy, which can be partly opened in flight for ventilation. Entry for all four occupants is from the wing root over the canopy sill. Compared to competitive aircraft of the same era the AA-5s are noted for their light and pleasant handling characteristics as well as high cruising speed for the installed power.

As derivatives of the original AA-1 Yankee, the AA-5 series share the same unique bonded aluminum wing and honeycomb fuselage that eliminates the need for rivets without sacrificing strength. The main landing gear is fibreglass with a spring-steel nose gear tube. There is no nosewheel steering as the nosewheel is free-castering through 180 degrees. Steering is by main wheel differential braking operated by using one's toes to push the tops of the rudder pedals. The wings have dihedral to improve lateral stability.

=== Modifications ===
In 2019, Garmin received a Supplemental Type Certificate for a full G3X Touch glass cockpit installation for the aircraft.

== Variants ==
AA-5 Traveler
1971 four-seat version of the AA-1 with a 150 hp (110 kW) Lycoming O-320-E2G engine, 821 built.
AA-5A Cheetah
1975 variant with larger fin fillet and no ventral fin fairing, redesigned engine cowling, and longer rear windows, 900 built.
AA-5B Tiger
1974 variant with a 180 hp (130 kW) Lycoming O-360-A4K engine and increased takeoff weight, 1323 built.
AA-5C
One prototype only.
AG-5B Tiger
1990 variant of the AA-5B produced by American General Aviation Corporation and Tiger Aircraft

== Specifications (2005 model Tiger Aircraft AG-5B Tiger) ==
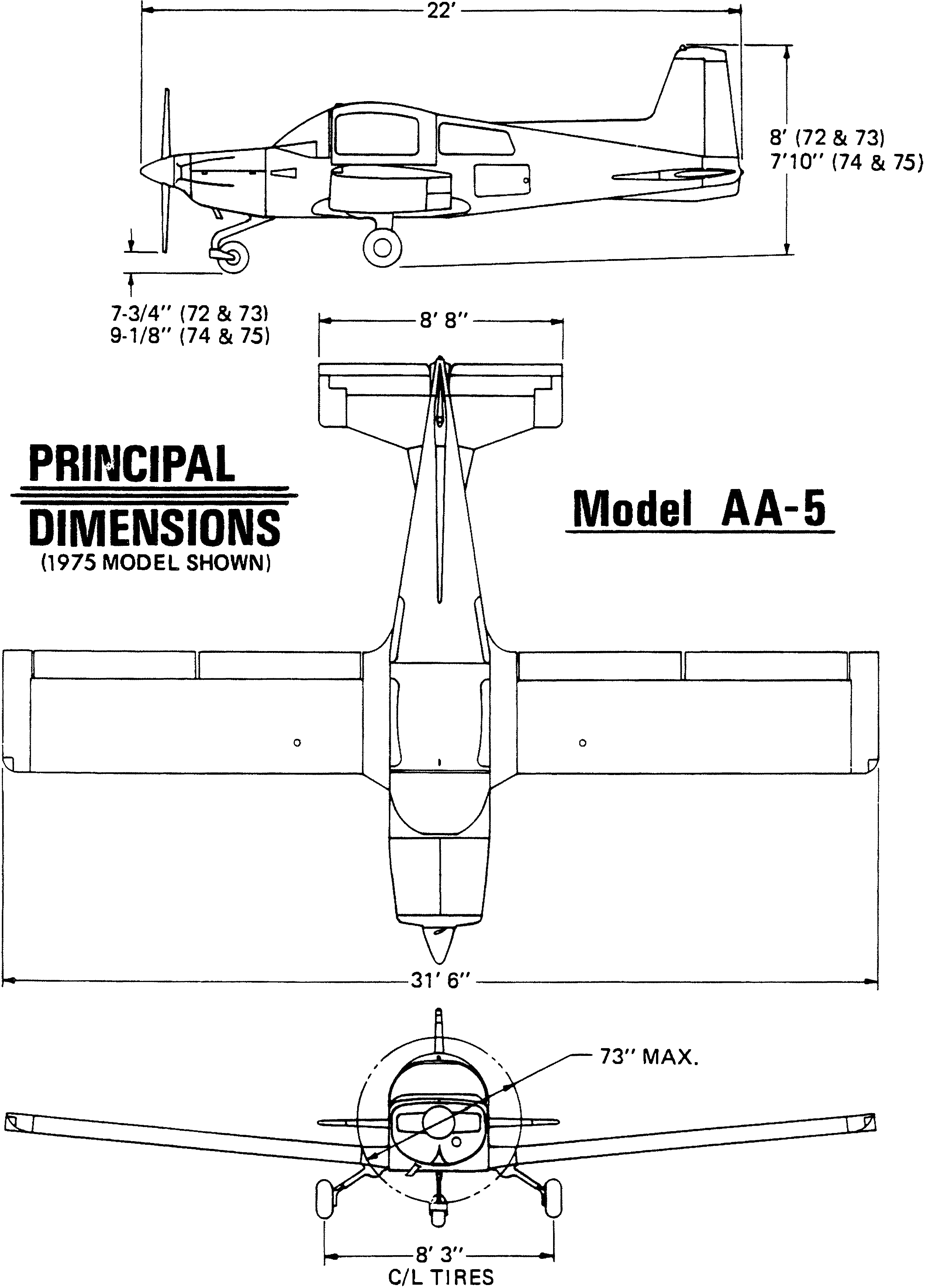
3-view line drawing of the Grumman American AA-5 Traveler

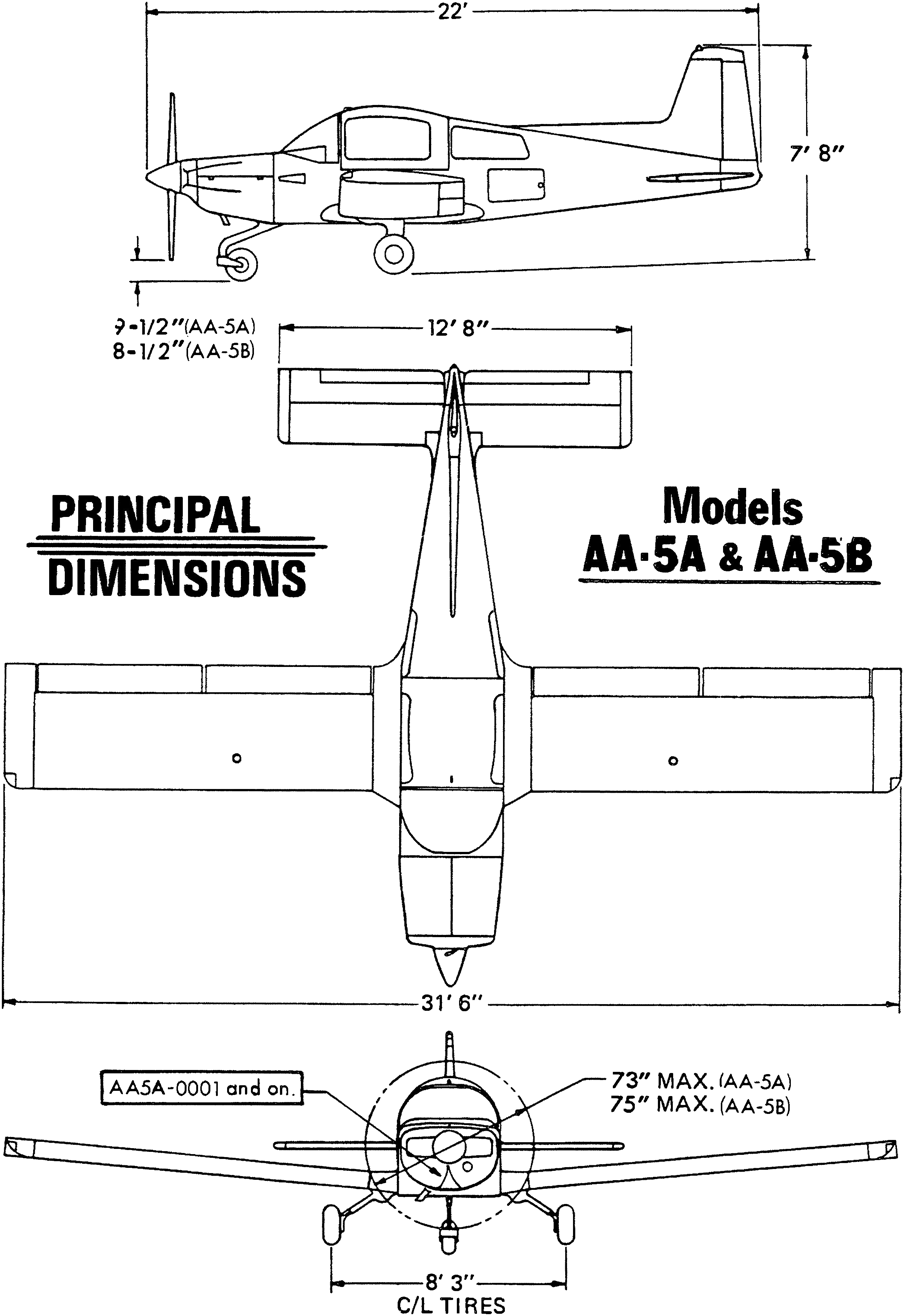
3-view line drawing of the Grumman American AA-5A Cheetah and AA-5B Tiger

Data from Type Certificate data sheet No.A16EA and Tiger Aircraft

General characteristics

- Crew: one
- Capacity: three passengers
- Length: 22 ft (6.7 m)
- Wingspan: 31 ft 6 in (9.60 m)
- Height: 8 ft (2.4 m)
- Wing area: 140 sq ft (13 m^{2})
- Empty weight: 1,500 lb (680 kg)
- Gross weight: 2,400 lb (1,089 kg)
- Fuel capacity: 51 U.S. gallons (190 L; 42 imp gal) usable
- Powerplant: 1 × Lycoming O-360-A4K air-cooled, 4-cylinder, horizontally-opposed piston engine, 180 hp (134 kW)
- Propellers: two-bladed Sensenich Propeller fixed pitch, 6 ft 3 in (1.91 m) diameter

Performance

- Maximum speed: 148 kn (170 mph, 274 km/h)
- Cruise speed: 143 kn (165 mph, 265 km/h) at 75% power and 8,500 ft (2,591 m)
- Stall speed: 53 kn (61 mph, 98 km/h) flaps down
- Never exceed speed: 174 kn (200 mph, 322 km/h)
- Range: 681 nmi (784 mi, 1,261 km)
- Endurance: 4.7 hours
- Service ceiling: 13,800 ft (4,200 m)
- Rate of climb: 850 ft/min (4.3 m/s)
- Wing loading: 17.1 lb/sq ft (83 kg/m^{2})
- Power/mass: 0.08 hp/lb (0.12 kW/kg)

== See also ==
Related development

- Bede BD-1
- Grumman American AA-1
- Gulfstream American GA-7 Cougar

Aircraft of comparable role, configuration, and era

- Vans RV-10
- Cessna 172 Skyhawk
- Cessna 177 Cardinal
- Piper PA-28 Cherokee
- Beechcraft Musketeer
- Mooney M20D (fixed gear version)
