= Bede BD-1 =

Type of aircraft

BD-1

General information
- Type: Light aircraft
- National origin: United States of America
- Manufacturer: Bede Aviation Corporation
- Designer: Jim Bede

History
- First flight: July 11, 1963
- Variant: Grumman American AA-1

The Bede BD-1 was a two-seat, single-engine, low-wing monoplane, the first design of American aeronautical engineer Jim Bede. The BD-1 was designed in 1960 as a kit-built aircraft intended for home assembly by amateur builders. Design goals included a kit price of $US 2500, including a rebuilt 100 hp (75 kW) engine and a cruise speed of 130 knots (240 km/h). The prototype N624BD first flew in 1962.

No kits were sold however, and it was not until Bede had been removed from the company and the design was reworked - including the removal of the folding wing feature - that it entered production as the American Aviation AA-1 Yankee, forerunner of the Grumman-American line of light aircraft.

== Design ==
The BD-1 was a low-wing monoplane of all-metal construction, utilizing aluminium honeycomb construction and a laminar flow wing. The aircraft was predominantly of bonded, rather than riveted, construction. It featured a sliding canopy and two seats. The aircraft was designed to be towed behind a car to allow it to be stored at home in a garage and thus reduce hangarage costs. To facilitate this goal the aircraft had folding wings and a horizontal stabilizer of less than 8 foot (2.4 m) width. It was designed to be fully aerobatic as well and was stressed for 9g (90 m/s²).

Many parts of the BD-1 were interchangeable to simplify production. For example, the wings were interchangeable as were the fin and horizontal tail. The ailerons and flaps were interchangeable and the rudder and elevators were also. Many aerodynamic and handling compromises were made to achieve this commonality of parts and trailer-ability.

The aircraft was intended to be offered with a variety of new or rebuilt engines. Rebuilt engines were to be available to reduce the purchase price. Design powerplants included the Continental A65-8 of 65 hp (48 kW), Continental C90-14F of 90 hp (67 kW), Continental O-200A of 100 hp (75 kW) and a Lycoming O-235C1 of 108 hp (81 kW).

== Development ==
The BD-1 was never developed beyond prototype stage and no kits were produced. The company Bede founded to produce the BD-1 kits, Bede Aviation Corporation, eventually became American Aviation and they pursued FAA certification under FAR 23 for the design so that completed aircraft could be sold. Due to financial problems Bede was forced out of the company and the BD-1 was redesigned.

During the redesign process the aircraft was modified so that the wings did not fold, making it easier to achieve certification. Other changes included a longer wing to improve rate of climb, an anti-servo tab on the elevator along with an elevator centering spring system to increase longitudinal stability and stall strips to improve the stall performance. The resulting aircraft entered production in the fall of 1968 as the 1969 model American Aviation AA-1 Yankee Clipper.

While the BD-1 never did enter production itself, it has had a lasting impact on light aircraft production and spawned a whole series of offspring designs including the Grumman American AA-1, AA-5, and Gulfstream American GA-7 Cougar. The ultimate derivative design, the Tiger Aircraft AG-5B Tiger, was produced until 2006 by Tiger Aircraft.

== Specifications (BD-1) ==
Data from Jane's All The World's Aircraft 1965-66

General characteristics

- Crew: one
- Capacity: one passenger
- Length: 18 ft 6 in (5.64 m)
- Wingspan: 23 ft 0 in (7.01 m)
- Height: 6 ft 3.5 in (1.918 m)
- Wing area: 93.3 sq ft (8.67 m^{2})
- Airfoil: NACA 64_{2}415
- Empty weight: 832 lb (377 kg)
- Max takeoff weight: 1,375 lb (624 kg)
- Fuel capacity: 25 US Gallons (94.5 L)
- Powerplant: 1 × Lycoming O-235-C1 air-cooled flat-four, 108 hp (81 kW)

Performance

- Maximum speed: 155 mph (249 km/h, 135 kn) at sea level
- Cruise speed: 135 mph (217 km/h, 117 kn) (econ cruise)
- Stall speed: 52 mph (84 km/h, 45 kn) (flaps down)
- Never exceed speed: 251 mph (404 km/h, 218 kn)
- Range: 600 mi (970 km, 520 nmi)
- Service ceiling: 18,000 ft (5,500 m)
- Rate of climb: 1,150 ft/min (5.8 m/s)

== See also ==
Related development

- AA-1
- AA-5
- GA-7

Aircraft of comparable role, configuration, and era

- Van's Aircraft RV-6
- Van's Aircraft RV-7
- Van's Aircraft RV-9
- Thorp T-211
