= Gulfstream American GA-7 Cougar =

American light aircraft

GA-7 Cougar & TB 320 Tangara
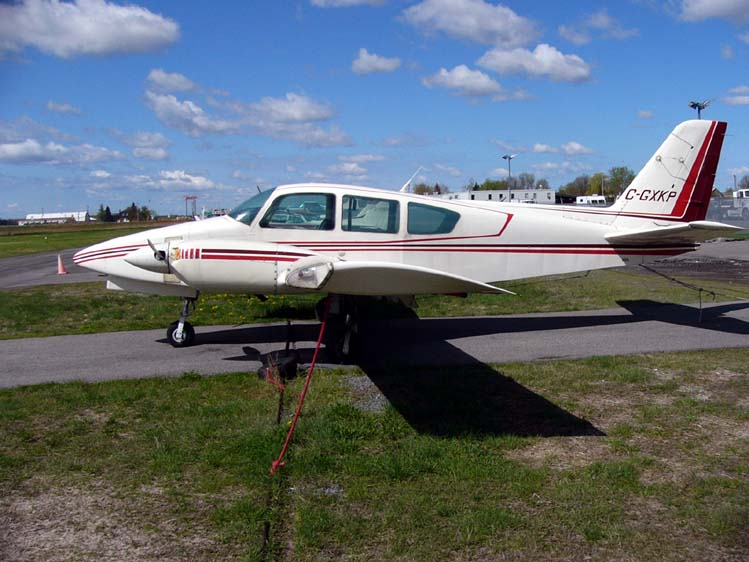

General information
- Type: Personal and trainer aircraft
- Manufacturer: Gulfstream American Aviation
- Number built: 115

History
- Manufactured: 1978-1979
- Introduction date: February 1978
- First flight: December 20, 1974

The Gulfstream American GA-7 Cougar is an all-metal, four-seat, twin-engined light aircraft. Designed and originally produced by the aircraft manufacturer Gulfstream American Aviation, it was a twin-engine development of the Gulfstream American AA-5B Tiger and traces its lineage to the AA-1 Yankee Clipper and the Bede BD-1.

== Development ==
The development of the GA-7 Cougar commenced during the early 1970s, at which point demand was booming for a single-engined general aviation aircraft. Accordingly, the company's designers had initially studied a relatively large single-engined aircraft. However, then-American Aviation president Russ Meyer was reportedly keen to develop a twin-engined aircraft that would possess equal performance to popular single-engined aircraft of the era, such as the Cessna 210 and the Beechcraft Bonanza, while being equipped with an extra engine for greater redundancy, which was viewed as particularly beneficial when performing night flights as well as on routes that traverse inhospitable terrain. The design process was somewhat protracted, partially due to the company's insistence on intensive wind tunnel testing.

One of the more atypical features of the Cougar was the design team's decision to use bonded wing skins, a recent and somewhat controversial innovation at that time. The designers also intended to fit engines capable of producing up to 250 hp (186 kW), which would have permitted the carriage of up to six occupants by the type; however, these ambitions were ultimately unrealised on the production aircraft. The decision to adopt less powerful engines was primarily driven by marketing; specially, it was believed that the best approach would be to initially produce the aircraft as an economical trainer and to later follow up with a variant equipped with more powerful engines that would greater appeal as a business aircraft. While these less powerful engines prevented it from carrying more than four occupants, this was not judged to be a significant sacrifice as market research had determined that few potential customers would actually make use of the additional seats.

A Cougar in flight, 2022

The prototype, which was powered by a pair of Lycoming O-320 engines capable of producing up to 160 hp (119 kW), made its maiden flight on 29 December 1974. A unique feature of this prototype was its fitting of a sliding canopy, an arrangement that was dispensed with in favour of a starboard side door on the production aircraft. The need to rework the aircraft's design, as well as Grumman's lack of experience in the general aviation sector, meant that the first production standard aircraft did not fly until 14 January 1977. It was first type certified under US FAR Part 23 by the Federal Aviation Administration on 22 September 1977.

Before production started the company was taken over on 1 September 1978 by American Jet Industries, who changed the company name to Gulfstream American. Production of the Cougar ran for only two model years, 1978 and 1979, before production was terminated. By this point, it had become clear that the company's jet-powered aircraft were more commercially successful, particularly in light of an emerging downturn in the general aviation market. Accordingly, only 115 aircraft were delivered.

Efforts to revive production of the aircraft have been made on multiple occasions. During 1991, plans were allegedly underway for the Cougar to be produced in the Soviet Union, but these came to nothing.

In 1995, the Cougar's type certificate was purchased by the French aircraft manufacturer SOCATA, which reportedly intended to establish its own production line and market the aircraft, which it referred to as the TB 320 Tangara, towards the training market. It was also to develop a variant with two Lycoming O-360-A1G6 engines of 180 hp (134 kW) each and a re-designed cockpit, it was designated the TB 360. The first Tangara was a modified Cougar, had 160 hp (119 kW) engines and first flew in mid-1996. The complete Tangara prototype was also a converted Cougar and had the 180 hp (134 kW) engines; it first flew in February 1997. Following delays in receiving certification for the redesigned aircraft, SOCATA announced in late 1999 that it had decided to indefinitely delay its plans to certify the type.

During the 2010s, SOCATA reportedly held discussions for the sale of the type certificate, tooling, manufacturing documentation, and the prototype. On 23 May 2019, the type certificate was transferred by SOCATA to the Cougar Aircraft Corporation in the United States. By 2022, NFX Aero had obtained ownership of the type certificate and was publicly stating its ambitions to resume production of the Cougar in the future.

== Design ==
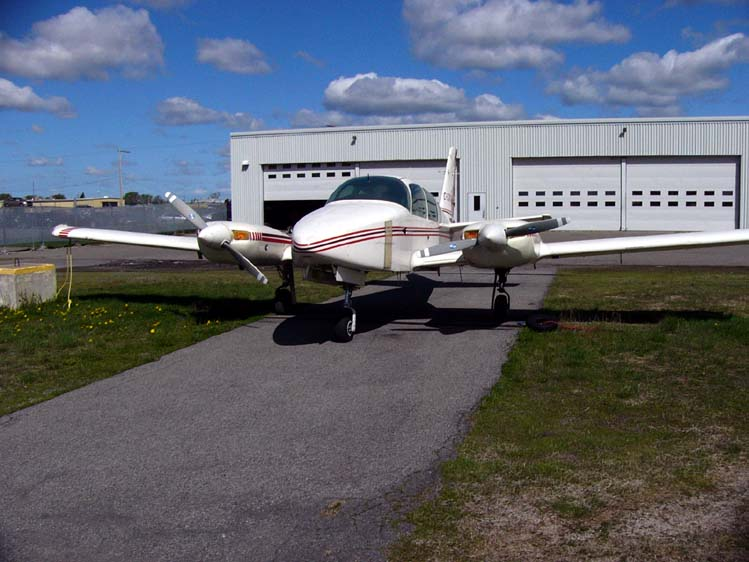
A Cougar on the ramp at Les Cedres Quebec, May 2005

The Cougar is a twin-engined low-wing cantilever monoplane; visually, it resembles the Piper PA-30 Twin Comanche. It was provisioned with a somewhat oversized vertical stabilizer. The pilot has a high level of unobstructed forward visibility. The cabin is relatively roomy, lined with spacious windows, and easily accommodates two rows of seats to carry a maximum of four occupants. It had a baggage capacity of 175 lb, which was divided between a rear compartment and a nose compartment.

The Cougar is furnished with a constant-chord slab wing, which lacks any visible rivets. Aside from the initial prototype, which featured a wing with a single spar, all other aircraft had wings with a double-spar configuration, which permitted a wet wing configuration. Overall, the Cougar makes use a honeycomb and bonded metal construction, which was a hallmark of the company's design since the BD-1. Its bonded metal construction has proven to be relatively durable.

The Cougar is powered by a pair of wing-mounted Lycoming O-320-D1D engines, capable of producing up to 160 hp (119 kW), which each drove a Hartzell constant speed propeller. In the event of a single-engine failure, the aircraft remains relatively docile, to the extent that flight training schools reportedly disliked this trait as students were unlikely to develop adequate respect for engine-out handling in twin-engined aircraft. The flight controls are well-balanced, although heavier than some of its competitors, making it relatively stable during flight; furthermore, the Cougar was designed to stall in advance of directional control being lost. Its fuel management is quite simplistic and fuel capacity relatively large for an aircraft of its size.

== Variants ==
GA7 Cougar
160 hp (119 kW) version designed by Grumman American and produced by Gulfstream American 1978-79. 115 aircraft built.
TB 320 Tangara
Restarted production of the 160 hp (119 kW) version by SOCATA, two modified Cougars were converted to Tangara prototypes 1996-97, production was never started.
TB 360 Tangara
Re-designed variant from SOCATA with 180 hp (134 kW) O-360 engines, one prototype (a modified Cougar) was first flown in 1997, never entered production.

== Specifications (Gulfstream American GA-7 Cougar) ==
Data from Federal Aviation Administration, The Incomplete Guide to Airfoil Usage, Pilot's Operating Handbook, Pilot Friend

General characteristics

- Crew: one
- Capacity: three passengers
- Length: 28 ft 8 in (8.74 m)
- Wingspan: 36 ft 10 in (11.23 m)
- Height: 10 ft 4 in (3.15 m)
- Wing area: 184 sq ft (17.1 m^{2})
- Airfoil: NACA 63A415
- Empty weight: 2,569 lb (1,165 kg)
- Gross weight: 3,800 lb (1,724 kg)
- Powerplant: 2 × Lycoming O-320-D1D four cylinder, horizontally-opposed aircraft engines, 160 hp (120 kW) each

Performance

- Maximum speed: 168 kn (193 mph, 311 km/h)
- Cruise speed: 160 kn (180 mph, 300 km/h) true airspeed
- Stall speed: 63 kn (72 mph, 117 km/h) calibrated airspeed, flaps down
- Never exceed speed: 188 kn (216 mph, 348 km/h) indicated airspeed
- Minimum control speed: 61 kn (70 mph, 113 km/h) indicated airspeed
- Range: 1,170 nmi (1,350 mi, 2,170 km) maximum economy with no reserves
- Service ceiling: 17,400 ft (5,300 m)
- Rate of climb: 1,150 ft/min (5.8 m/s)
- Wing loading: 20.65 lb/sq ft (100.8 kg/m^{2})
- Power/mass: 11.9 lb/hp (7.19 kg/kW)

== See also ==
Related development

- Grumman American AA-5

Aircraft of comparable role, configuration, and era

- Beechcraft Duchess
- Piper PA-44 Seminole
