= DeltaHawk DH180 =

American diesel aircraft engine

DH180
- Type: Liquid-cooled V-four diesel piston aircraft engine
- National origin: United States
- Manufacturer: DeltaHawk Engines, Inc.
- First run: 1997
- Major applications: Piper Seminole DX, Cirrus SR20

The DH180 is V4 piston diesel aircraft engine developed for aircraft applications by DeltaHawk of Racine, Wisconsin. The engine was type certified on April 7, 2023.

== Design ==
The design is a four-cylinder, two-stroke, piston diesel engine, in an inverted-V configuration, with turbocharging and supercharging, mechanical fuel injection, liquid cooling, direct drive. It can run on Jet-A or sustainable aviation fuel. The manufacturer claims that it has "40 percent fewer moving parts than other engines in its category."

== Development ==
In 2014, a DH180 was installed and demonstrated at the EAA Airventure airshow on a Cirrus SR20. A retrofit kit is planned for the SR20.

The engine received its type certificate from the Federal Aviation Administration on April 7, 2023, with first customer deliveries planned for 2024.

The US National Aeronautics and Space Administration selected the engine for their Subsonic Single Aft Engine Aircraft scale flight test vehicle.

== Variants ==
DHK180
Certified version, 180 hp (134 kW)

== Applications ==
- Barrows Bearhawk
- Cirrus SR20
- Lambert Mission 212
- Van's Aircraft RV-8
- Velocity XL

== Specifications (DHK180) ==
Data from TCDS, AVweb and manufacturer

=== General characteristics ===
- Type: V4, two-stroke, liquid-cooled, piston, diesel aircraft engine
- Bore: 4 in (10 cm)
- Stroke: 4 in (10 cm)
- Displacement: 202 cu in (3 L)
- Length: 33 in (84 cm)
- Width: 24 in (61 cm)
- Height: 22 in (56 cm)
- Dry weight: 357 lb (161.9 kg)

=== Components ===
- Supercharger: twin screw
- Turbocharger: yes
- Fuel system: mechanical injection, mechanical gear pump, one injection pump per cylinder
- Fuel type: certifies for Jet-A, Jet A-1, SAF; will also burn JP5, JP8, D1, D2, JP-8-100, F-24,
- Oil system: dry sump, external mechanical gear pump
- Cooling system: liquid

=== Performance ===
- Power output: 180 hp (134 kW) at 2600 rpm, five minutes maximum for take-off; 135 hp (101 kW) at 2200 rpm, continuous
- Compression ratio: 20.1:1
- Fuel consumption: 7.3 gal/hr (27.6 L/hr)at 135 HP Economy Cruise, 10.8 gal/hr (40.9 L/hr) at 180 hp
- Specific fuel consumption: 0.054 US gal/hp/h (0.27 L/kW/h)
- Power-to-weight ratio: 0.50 hp/lb

== See also ==
- DeltaHawk DH160
