= American Aviation AA-2 Patriot =

American light aircraft

AA-2 Patriot

General information
- Type: Four-seat cabin monoplane
- National origin: Cleveland, Ohio, United States
- Manufacturer: American Aviation
- Number built: 2

History
- First flight: 1970

The American Aviation AA-2 Patriot was a four-seat, all-metal aircraft that was developed in 1970-71 by American Aviation of Cleveland, Ohio. The design did not progress beyond the prototype stage.

== Development ==
After the market success of the AA-1 Yankee Clipper American Aviation turned their attention to developing a four-seat aircraft. The American Aviation engineers started with a "clean sheet of paper" and designed a new aircraft. This aircraft was intended to be produced as the American Aviation AA-2 Patriot.

The resulting prototype bore very little family resemblance to the AA-1. The AA-2 was different from the AA-1 in that it had doors instead of the Yankee's trademark sliding canopy and an oleo strut in place of the Yankee's spring steel tube nose gear. The aircraft had provisions for retractable gear to be installed on a later version, although the prototype had fixed landing gear. The AA-2 was powered by a 180 hp (134 kW) Lycoming engine.

The prototype, registered "N488AA", was completed in 1970 and test flying was commenced early in that same year. Aircraft performance during the test flying process fell far short of the design goals so the project was abandoned and the manufacturer eventually disassembled the prototype.

American Aviation made the decision to develop a stretched version of the AA-1 Yankee Clipper instead of pursuing the AA-2. This aircraft eventually was produced as the AA-5 Traveler and was later developed into the AA-5A Cheetah and the AA-5B Tiger.

== Survivors ==
The prototype has been recovered by members of the American Yankee Association.

== Specifications (AA-2 Patriot) ==
General characteristics

- Crew: One
- Capacity: Three passengers
- Length: 23 ft 3 in (7.09 m)
- Wingspan: 30 ft 0 in (9.14 m)
- Max takeoff weight: 2,400 lb (1,089 kg)
- Powerplant: 1 × Lycoming O-360-A1A air-cooled, four-cylinder, horizontally-opposed piston engine, 180 hp (130 kW)

Performance

- Maximum speed: 135 kn (155 mph, 249 km/h)
- Range: 613 nmi (705 mi, 1,135 km)

== See also ==
Related development

- Grumman American AA-1
- Grumman American AA-5
