= DeltaHawk Engines, Inc. =

American aircraft engine manufacturer

- Type: Manufacturing
- Industry: Aerospace
- Founded: 1996
- Founder: Doug and Diane Doers, JP and Jeanne Brooks
- Headquarters: Racine, Wisconsin, United States
- Key people: Alan Ruud
- Products: Aircraft engines
- Website: www.deltahawk.com

DeltaHawk Engines, Inc. is an American aircraft engine manufacturer.

The company builds Diesel and Jet-A-fuelled engines for general aviation aircraft.

DeltaHawk engines have been tested in a Velocity RG homebuilt aircraft, an Australian Delta D2 helicopter and retrofitted in a Cirrus SR20 certified aircraft. In 2011 The State of Wisconsin and the city of Racine, Wisconsin granted low-interest loans to expand the company's production capability.

DeltaHawk was originally working toward a 2012 Federal Aviation Administration certification of its engine line and later set a goal of 2015, but these were not achieved. The DeltaHawk DH180 received its type certificate from the FAA in May 2023, with first customer deliveries planned for 2024. DeltaHawk DH160 certification has not been completed.

On 1 Feb 2024 Deltahawk announced the addition of 200HP and a 235HP engines.

The Ruud family, led by Alan Ruud, took controlling interest in the company in May 2015. Their plans include development of the existing models in the engine line, plus development of higher horsepower engines for certified light aircraft.

== Engines ==
- DH160A4/V4/R4 160 hp (120 kW) V-4
- DH180A4/V4/R4 180 hp (130 kW) V-4
- DHK200 200 hp (150 kW) V-4
- DHK235 223 hp (166 kW) V-4
