= Stall strips =

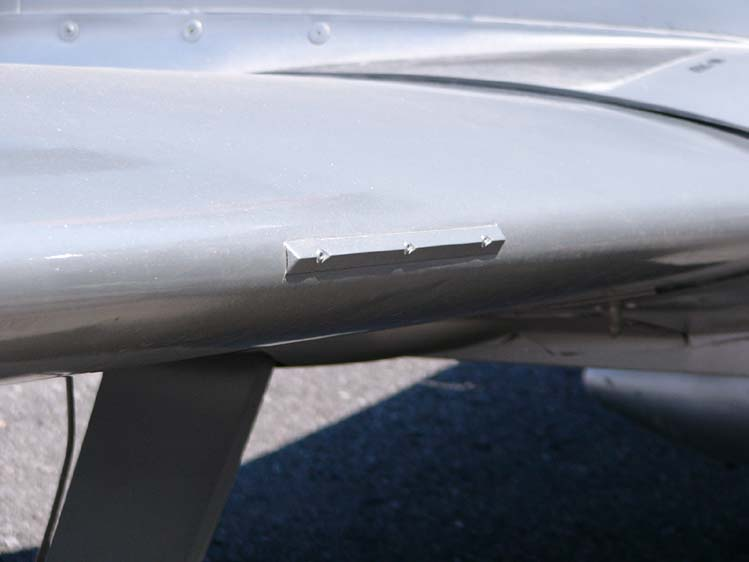
One of a pair of stall strips installed on an American Aviation AA-1 Yankee during manufacture

A stall strip is a small component fixed to the leading edge of the wing of an airplane to modify its aerodynamic characteristics. These stall strips may be necessary for the airplane to comply with type certification requirements.

A stall strip typically consists of a small piece of material, usually aluminium, triangular in cross section and often 6-12 inches (15–30 cm) in length. It is riveted or bonded to the wing’s leading edge. Some airplanes have one stall strip on each wing. Some airplanes have only one stall strip on one wing.

== Operation ==
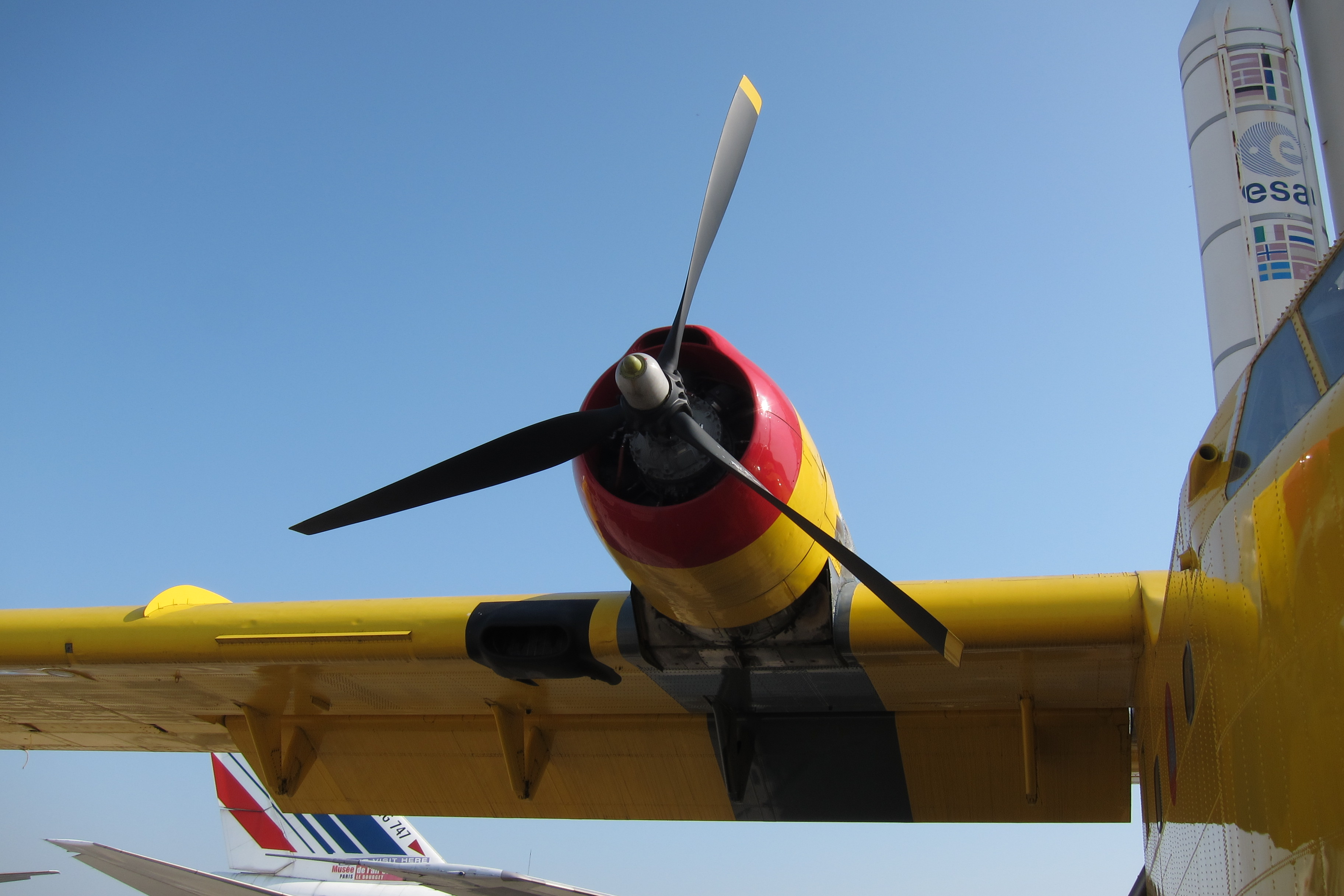
The CL-215 has a stall strip on the right wing only

A stall strip initiates flow separation on a region of the upper surface of the wing during flight at high angle of attack. This is typically to avoid a tendency to spin following a stall, or to improve the controllability of the airplane as it approaches the stall. A stall strip may be intended to alter the wing’s stall characteristics and ensure that the wing root stalls before the wing tips.

In some cases, such as the American Aviation AA-1 Yankee, both wings are designed to incorporate stall strips. In the case of the AA-1 the left and right wings were identical, interchangeable and built on a single wing jig, thus the more traditional use of washout in the wing design was not possible.

Stall strips are usually factory-installed but, on rarer occasions, may be an after-market modification.

== See also ==
- Stall warning and safety devices
