= Wing root =

Portion of aircraft wing

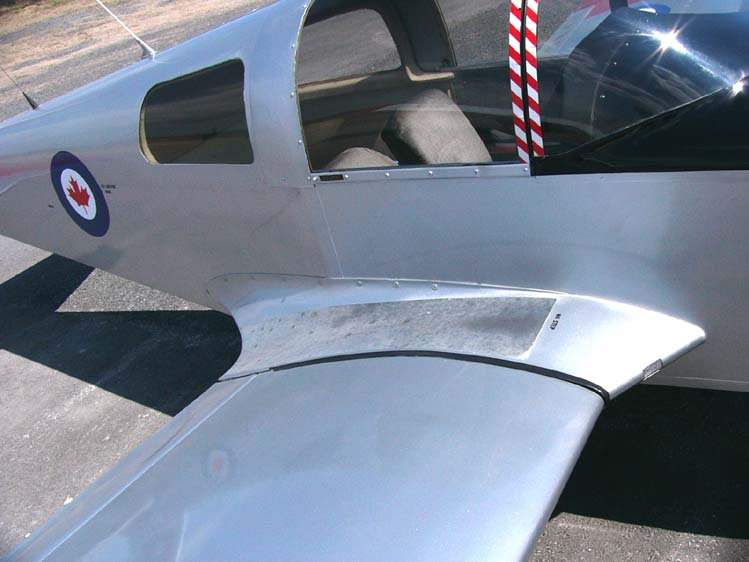
The wing root of a simple aircraft, an American Aviation AA-1 Yankee, showing a wing root fairing

The wing root is the part of the wing on a fixed-wing aircraft or winged-spaceship that is closest to the fuselage, and is the junction of the wing with the fuselage (not with a nacelle or any other body). The term is also used for the junction of the wing with the opposite wing, i.e., on the fuselage centerline, as with the upper wing of a biplane. The opposite end of a wing from the wing root is the wing tip.

The aerodynamic properties of the overall aircraft can be greatly impacted by the shaping and other design choices of the wing root. During both normal flight and landings, the wing root of an aircraft would be typically subjected to the highest bending forces through the aircraft. As a means of reducing interference drag between the wing and the fuselage, the use of fairings (often referred to as "wing fillets") became commonplace during the first half of the twentieth century; the use of wing root fairings has been credited with achieving more favourable flight characteristics at both high and low speeds. Furthermore, various other innovations and approaches have been developed to influence/control airflow in the vicinity of the wing root to achieve more favourable performance. Various calculating methods for designed an optimal wing root of an aircraft have been devised.

Fatigue has been recognised as a critical life-limiting factor associated with the wing root, which will eventually lead to catastrophic failure if not monitored. Accordingly, it is commonplace within an aircraft's maintenance regime to mandate periodic assessments of the wing root to check for fatigue cracking and other signs of strain. For this purpose, the use of appropriately-applied strain gauges has become widespread, although alternative methods of detection have also been used.

In the case of hypersonic aircraft, the wing root is judged to be a critical structural areas in terms of its heat migration and dissipation properties.

== See also ==
- Wingbox
