= Grumman American AA-1 =

American light aircraft

AA-1 series
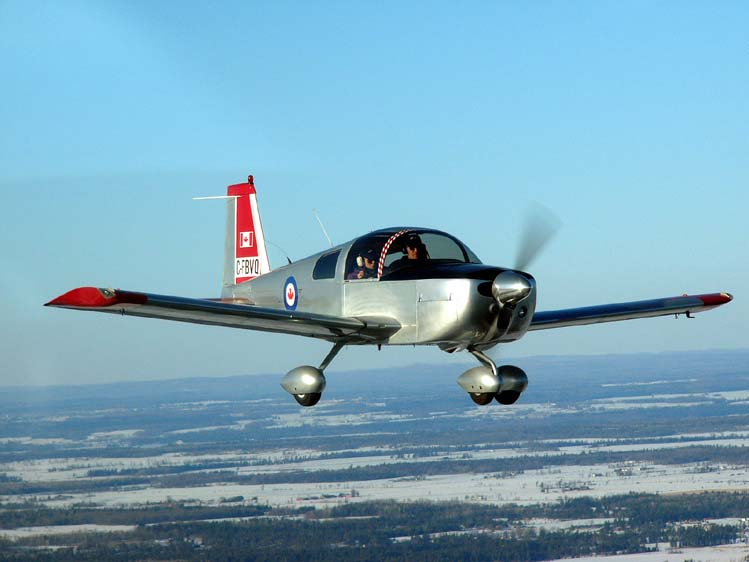
- American Aviation AA-1 Yankee

General information
- Type: Sport, personal and trainer aircraft
- Manufacturer: American Aviation
- Designer: Jim Bede
- Number built: 1,820

History
- Manufactured: 1968–1978
- Introduction date: 1968
- First flight: July 11, 1963 as BD-1 prototype
- Developed from: Bede BD-1
- Variants: AA-5 series

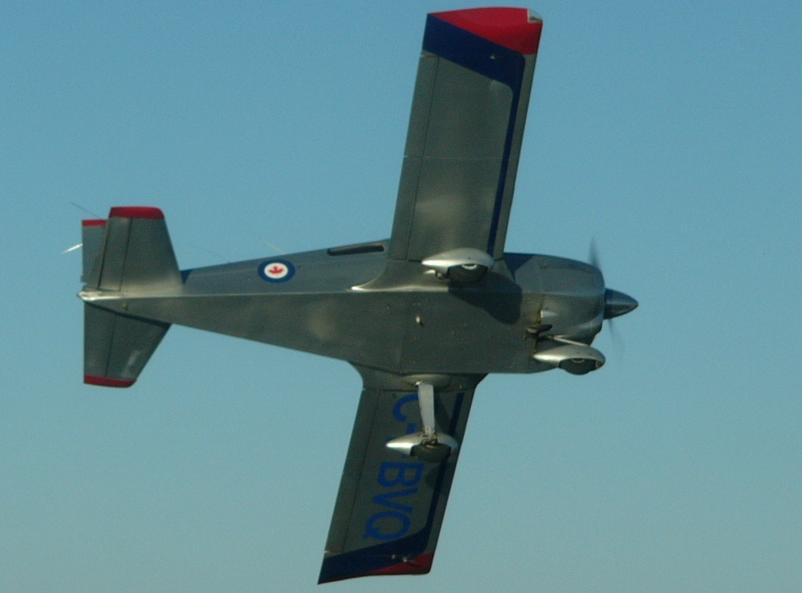
Underside of an AA-1 Yankee, showing the square fuselage construction

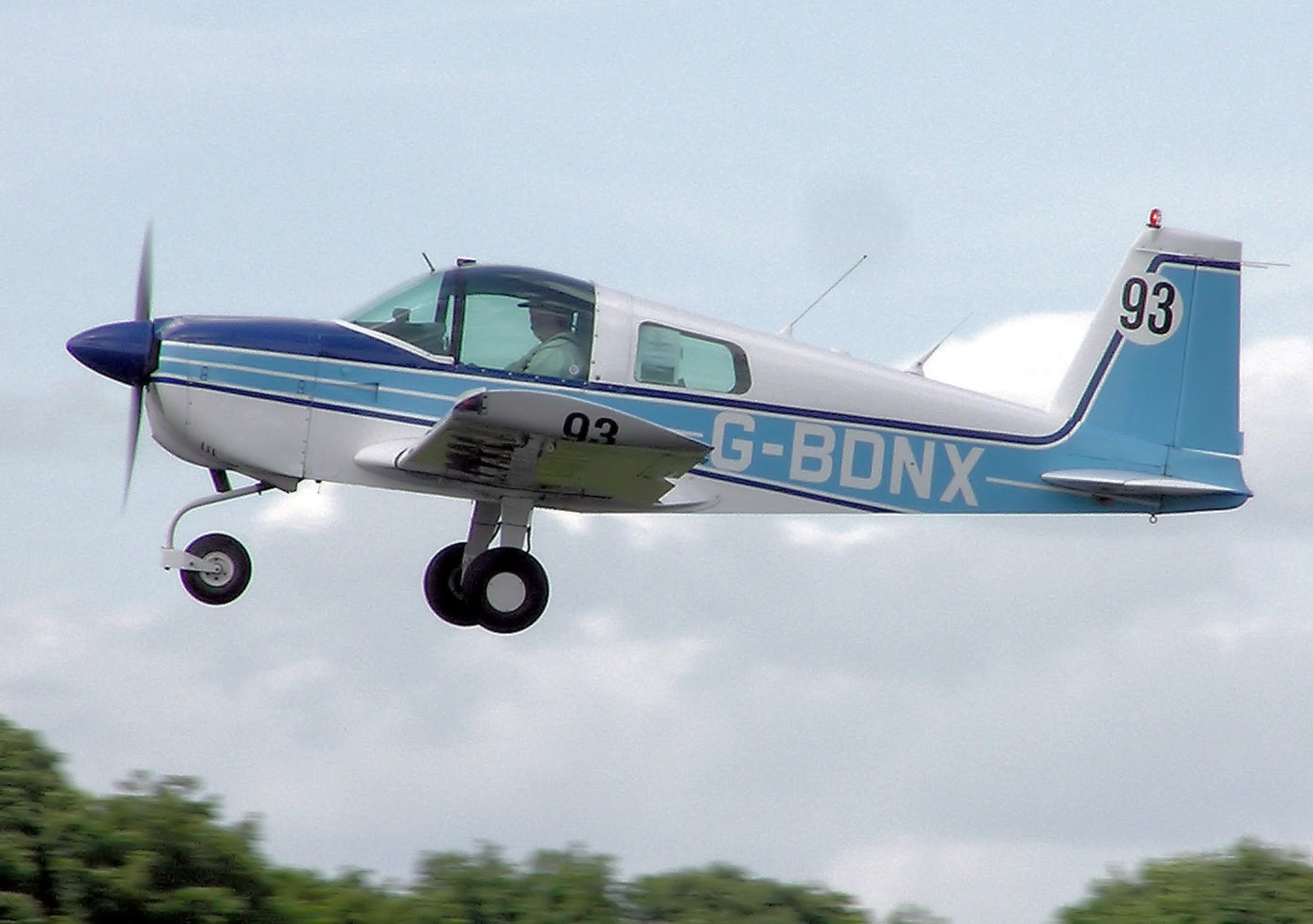
1975 Grumman AA-1B Trainer taking off

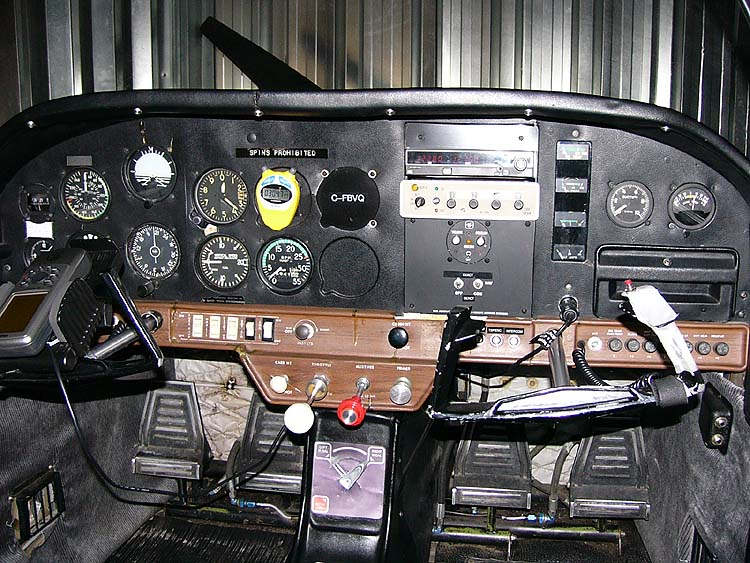
American Aviation AA-1 Yankee instrument panel

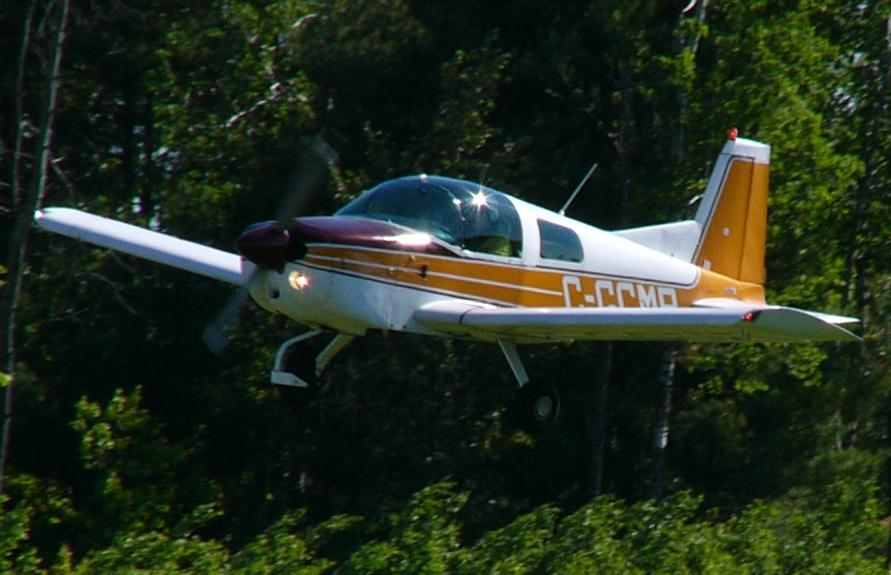
A Grumman American AA-1B Trainer with an aftermarket dorsal strake modification

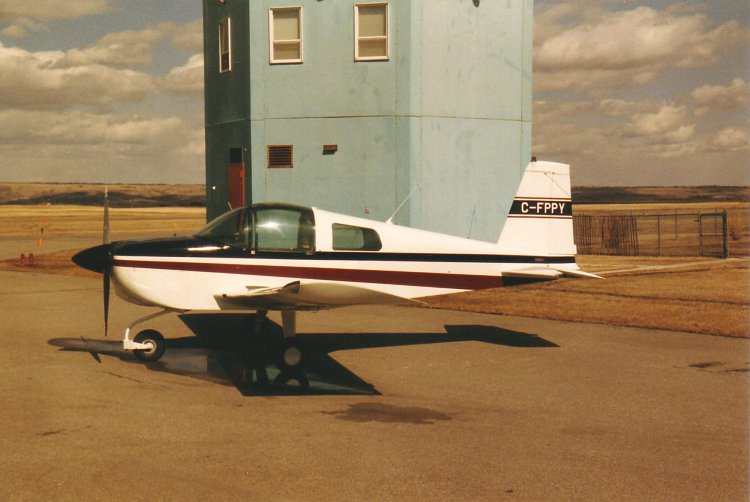
An American Aviation AA-1 Yankee side view

The Grumman American AA-1 series is a family of light, two-seat aircraft. The family includes the original American Aviation AA-1 Yankee and AA-1A Trainer along with the TR-2. The TR-2 has a cruise propeller and the trainer has a climb prop. Typically the TR-2 came with more navigation instruments and was better for cross country flying because of its speed and lower fuel consumption. The family also includes the Grumman American AA-1B Trainer and TR-2, plus the Gulfstream American AA-1C Lynx and T-Cat.

== Development history ==
The Yankee was originally designed in 1962 by Jim Bede as the BD-1 and was intended to be sold as a kit-built aircraft. Bede decided to certify the design under the then-new FAR Part 23 rules and offer it as a completed aircraft. No BD-1 kits were ever sold.

The prototype first flew on July 11, 1963, and featured folding wings for trailering and ease of storage. Bede formed a company, Bede Aviation Corporation, based in Cleveland, Ohio, to produce the aircraft, but the BD-1 never entered production as a certified aircraft. At that time, the FAA was hesitant to certify a light aircraft with folding wings. The certification process was complex and expensive, and disagreements arose between Bede and the other shareholders. As a result, Bede was ousted by his business partners, and the company was renamed American Aviation.

=== AA-1 Yankee Clipper ===
American's engineers reworked the wing to remove the folding feature, easing FAR Part 23 certification. Other changes included adding extended wing tips to improve rate-of-climb, an anti-servo tab on the elevator along with a centering spring system to increase longitudinal stability and stall strips to improve handling during a stall. The company designated the redesigned aircraft the AA-1 Yankee Clipper.

The AA-1 was certified under FAR Part 23 on August 29, 1967, with the first production AA-1 flying on May 30, 1968. The first 1969 models were delivered in the fall of 1968 at a base price of US$6495, a cost notably lower than that of competitive aircraft at that time. American Aviation built 459 examples of the AA-1 Yankee Clipper between 1969 and 1971 at their factory in Cleveland, Ohio.

=== AA-1A Trainer ===
In 1971, American Aviation modified the NACA 64-415 airfoil used on the AA-1's wing, creating the AA-1A Trainer. The recontoured leading edge produced softer stall characteristics and permitted lower approach speeds. While this did tame the AA-1's sharp stall, it also reduced the cruise speed compared to the original AA-1 by 10 mph. First flight was on March 25, 1970, and 470 AA-1As were built in 1971–72.

=== AA-1B Trainer and TR-2 ===
Grumman bought American Aviation in 1971, renaming it Grumman American Aviation, and beginning in late 1972 sold the 1973 model year design as the Grumman American AA-1B Trainer for school use. The variant designed for the personal-use market was called the TR-2 and it featured a standard radio and trim package. The AA-1B was produced until 1976. 680 AA-1Bs were produced.

All the AA-1s, AA-1As and AA-1Bs were powered by the Lycoming O-235-C2C low-compression engine designed for 80/87 avgas, which produced 108 hp.

=== AA-1C Lynx and T-Cat ===
The Grumman light aircraft line was then acquired by Gulfstream Aerospace in 1977 who formed it into their light aircraft division, Gulfstream American, in Savannah, Georgia. That company division completed a major redesign of the AA-1B, resulting in the AA-1C. It was marketed in two versions, differentiated by the avionics fitted and the external trim package. The Lynx was targeted at private owners while the T-Cat was the flying school trainer. These names were chosen to position the aircraft in the Gulfstream American line which, at that time featured the Cheetah, Tiger and the Cougar.

The AA-1C received a new larger horizontal tail and other significant improvements, including a 115 hp Lycoming O-235-L2C high-compression engine designed for 100LL fuel, which brought the cruise speed back up to that of the original 108 hp Yankee. 211 AA-1Cs were produced in 1977 and 1978.

The last AA-1C was produced by Gulfstream American in 1978. Overall, 1820 AA-1 family aircraft were built between 1969 and 1978.

The type certificate for the AA-1 family of aircraft is currently held by True Flight Holdings LLC who bought the assets of Tiger Aircraft on August 2, 2007.

== Features ==
All models of the AA-1 accommodate two people in side-by-side seating under a sliding canopy and are noted for their exceptionally light handling. The Yankee and its four-seater siblings, the AA-5 series, feature a unique bonded aluminum honeycomb fuselage and bonded wings that eliminate the need for rivets without sacrificing strength. The wide-track main landing gear struts are laminated fiberglass for shock absorption, marketed as the "Face Saver" design by American Aviation.

The Yankee was originally designed to minimize the number of airframe parts used, with the aim of simplifying production and saving money. As a result of this philosophy, many parts were interchangeable. Due to the use of a non-tapered tubular spar, which doubled as the fuel tank, and the lack of wing washout, the wings could be exchanged left and right. The fin and horizontal stabilizers were interchangeable, as were the rudder and the elevators. The ailerons and flaps were similarly the same part. While it did succeed in making production easier, this design philosophy produced many aerodynamic compromises in the design. For instance, because the flaps were the same part as the ailerons they were too small to be effective as flaps. The lack of wing washout, necessitated by the wing interchangeability requirement, meant that stall strips had to be installed to produce acceptable stall characteristics for certification. Over time this philosophy of compromising the aerodynamics in favour of a minimized parts count was abandoned. For example, the redesign of the AA-1B into the AA-1C by Gulfstream involved wider-span elevators and horizontal stabilizers that produced better longitudinal stability, but were no longer interchangeable with the rudder and fin.

Powered by the same 108 hp Lycoming O-235 engine as the Cessna 152, the original Yankee cruises twenty percent faster thanks to the cleaner wing and better aerodynamics.

== Safety record ==
The original American Aviation AA-1 Yankee was designed to fill the role of a personal transportation and touring aircraft. Many of the early production models were purchased by flying schools. The appeal of the AA-1 to schools was obvious – compared to the competition, the AA-1 was faster, cost less to purchase and maintain and, most importantly, had more student-appeal with its sliding canopy and fighter-like looks.

Many of the early school accidents were related to spin-training. Once the AA-1 entered a fully developed spin and exceeded three turns, it was usually not recoverable. The AA-1 had been spin-tested as part of its certification, but in 1973 the FAA issued Airworthiness Directive 73-13-07 ordering the aircraft placarded against spins.

The remaining accidents were generally attributed to the AA-1's short endurance (3.3 hours), inability to use short grass strips and high approach speeds (85–90 mph). These were all different from the other school aircraft in use in that era and took some adaptation by instructors and students alike.

Today most of the AA-1s, AA-1As, Bs and Cs are in private hands. If the pilot is properly trained on the aircraft and stays within its limitations, data show that it is as safe as any other light aircraft.

== Modifications ==
Some AA-1s have had their original engines replaced with larger 150 or 160 hp engines that further increase performance. Other popular modifications include the addition of a dorsal strake on earlier model AA-1s to improve yaw stability or the addition of a transparent red rudder cap to fair the flashing beacon for reduced drag. Some AA-1s have been converted to taildragger configuration.

== Variants ==
AA-1 Yankee
1968 – Production version developed from the Bede BD-1 with a 108hp Lycoming O-235-C2C engine, 461 built.
AA-1A Trainer
1971 – Dual-control trainer version with modified wing aerofoil, 470 built.
AA-1B Trainer/TR-2
1972 – Development of the AA-1A with an increase in useful load, also sold as the TR-2 touring model, 680 built.
AA-1C T-Cat/Lynx
1976 – AA-1B with a 115hp Lycoming O-235-L2C engine, AA-5 elevators and modified engine mount, marketed as the T-Cat as trainer replacement for the Trainer and as the Lynx tourer to replace the TR-2, 211 built.

== Aircraft on display ==
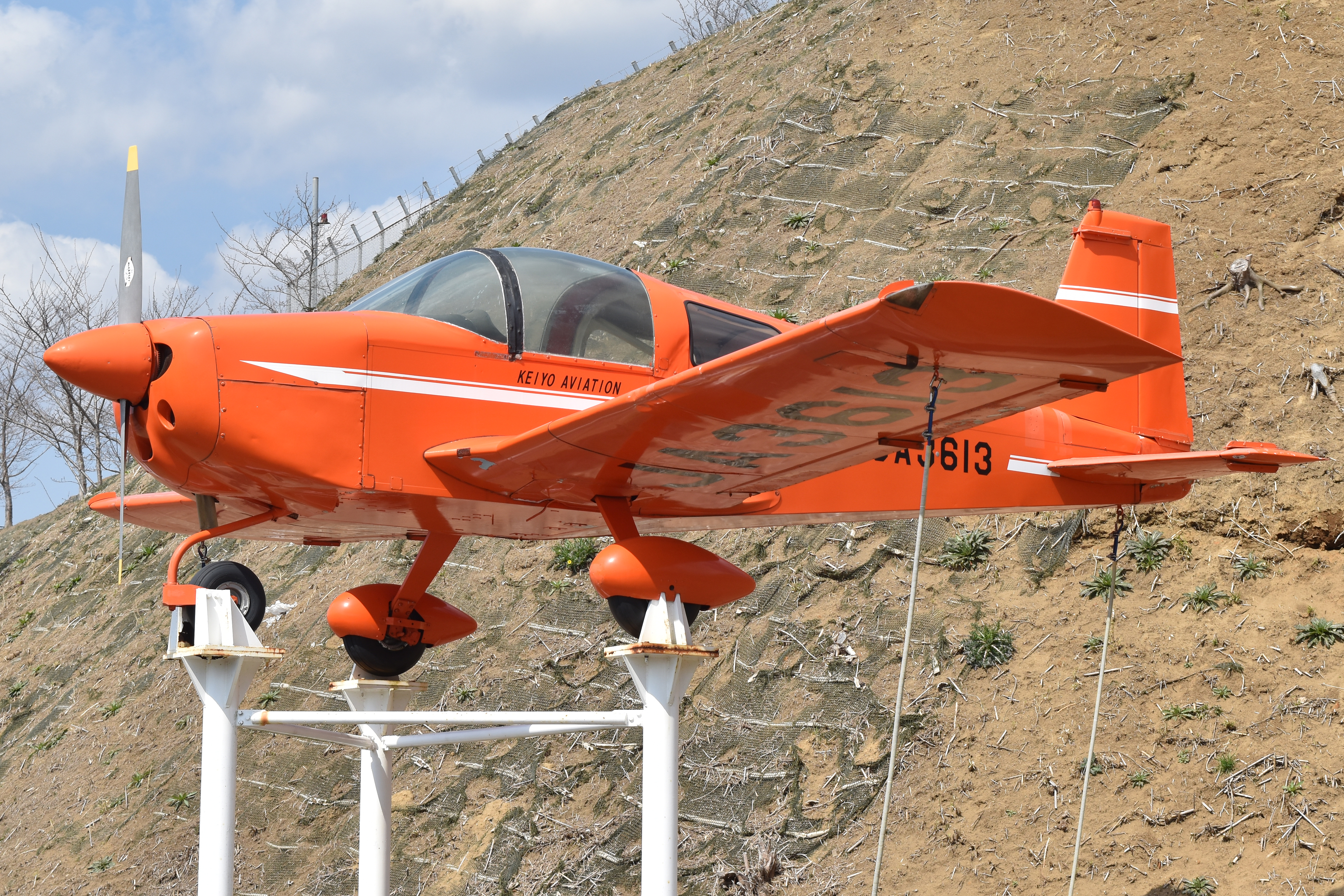
AA-1 Yankee JA3613 outside the Museum of Aeronautical Science, Chiba

- AA-1 Yankee AA1-0001 – N501NA at the Virginia Air and Space Science Center, Hampton, Virginia, used by NASA for stall and spin tests. The museum states "... built in 1969. This aircraft... was the first Grumman-Yankee ever built."
- AA-1 Yankee AA1-0428 – JA3613 at the Museum of Aeronautical Science, Shibayama, Chiba prefecture, Japan.

== Specifications (AA-1A) ==
Data from The American Trainer Owner's Manual

General characteristics

- Crew: one pilot
- Capacity: one passenger
- Length: 19 ft 2.9 in (5.87 m)
- Wingspan: 24 ft 5.5 in (7.46 m)
- Height: 6 ft 9.6 in (2.07 m)
- Wing area: 98 sq ft (9.11 m^{2})
- Empty weight: 1,018 lb (461 kg)
- Max takeoff weight: 1,500 lb (680 kg)
- Powerplant: 1 × Lycoming O-235-C2C flat-four engine, 108 hp (80.6 kW)

Performance

- Maximum speed: 120 kn (138 mph, 222 km/h)
- Cruise speed: 108 kn (125 mph, 201 km/h)
- Stall speed: 52 kn (60 mph, 97 km/h)
- Never exceed speed: 169 kn (195 mph, 314 km/h)
- Range: 424 nmi (488 mi, 785 km) at 8,000 ft (2,438 m)
- Service ceiling: 13,750 ft (4,191 m)
- Rate of climb: 765 ft/min (3.89 m/s)
- Wing loading: 14.9 lb/sq ft (72.75 kg/m^{2})
- Power/mass: 13.9 lb/hp (8.42 kg/kW)

== See also ==
Related development

- AA-5
- Bede BD-1

Aircraft of comparable role, configuration, and era

- Beechcraft Skipper
- Cessna 150 and 152
- Liberty XL2
- Piper Tomahawk
- Rans S-19 Venterra
- Scottish Aviation Bulldog
- Symphony SA-160
- Thorp T-211
- Van's Aircraft RV-6, RV-7, and RV-9
