= Hartzell =

Hartzell is a surname. Notable people with the surname include:

- Andy Hartzell, American cartoonist
- C. C. Hartzell, American confectioner
- Carl Hartzell (born 1967), Swedish diplomat
- Curt Hartzell (1891–1975), Swedish gymnast
- Eric Hartzell (born 1989), American ice hockey player
- James Hartzell (1931–2010), American advertising copywriter
- Jay Hartzell (born 1969), American economist
- Joseph Crane Hartzell (1842–1929), American missionary
- Kyle Hartzell (born 1985), American lacrosse player
- Oscar Hartzell (1876–1943), American fraudster
- Paul Hartzell (born 1953), American baseball player
- Robert N. Hartzell (1896–1968), American engineer, founder of Hartzell Propellers
- Roy Hartzell (1881–1961), American baseball player
- William Hartzell (1837–1903), American politician

== Other uses ==
- Hartzell, Missouri, a community in the United States
- Hartzell Propeller, an American aircraft propeller manufacturing company
- Mount Hartzell, a mountain in British Columbia, Canada
