= Tiger Aircraft =

- Industry: Aerospace
- Founded: 1999
- Defunct: 2006
- Fate: bankrupt
- Successor: True Flight Aerospace
- Headquarters: Martinsburg, West Virginia, United States
- Key people: President and Chief Operating Officer N. Gene Criss
- Products: AG-5B Tiger

Tiger Aircraft LLC was an American aircraft manufacturer from 1999 to 2006 based in Martinsburg, West Virginia, United States.

== History ==
The company was established in 1999 with the aim of returning the AG-5B Tiger to production. Tiger Aircraft followed in the footsteps of Grumman American, Gulfstream American and American General Aviation Corporation in manufacturing the Tiger.

Tiger Aircraft had ceased operations by November 2006 and filed for bankruptcy in January 2007.

=== Financial difficulties ===
Tiger Aircraft was headed by President and Chief Operating Officer N. Gene Criss between August 25, 2003, and early August 2006. Criss was fired by the board for allegedly selling the assets of the company to Network Hosts without authority. The four companies that owned Tiger Aircraft applied to a West Virginia Circuit Court at that time for a restraining order to prevent further sales and also to declare the previous deals invalid.

By the middle of 2006, Tiger Aircraft was experiencing financial problems, production of AG-5Bs had been halted, and production workers had been laid off. By November 2006, the company employed only two workers and owed $115,000 in back taxes to the municipality. On November 30, 2006, it was announced that the Tiger Aircraft buildings were for sale. Tiger Aircraft filed for bankruptcy in January 2007.

== Products ==
Tiger Aircraft received FAA Part 23 certification for the AG-5B in 2001 and its production certificate in 2002. 51 AG-5B Tigers were produced between 2001 and 2006, with only three being completed in 2006.

== Asset acquisition by True Flight Aerospace ==
The Federal Bankruptcy Court approved the sale of Tiger Aircraft assets to True Flight Holdings LLC, now operating as True Flight Aerospace, on August 2, 2007. The assets included aircraft type certificates for the former Grumman American light aircraft AA-1 family and AA-5 family, tooling, aircraft building equipment, intellectual property rights, inventories of existing parts and raw materials.

In November 2007, True Flight announced plans to construct a new production facility at the local airport of Valdosta, Georgia, and commence production of parts first.

The company exhibited at Sun 'n Fun 2008 and indicated that it would produce the AG-5B Tiger first. The company indicated that it would later expand the line of aircraft models available. The new Valdosta facility was to have been opened in February 2008.

In early 2009, the company decided to move to an existing vacant production facility in Quitman, Georgia, rather than proceed with constructing new facilities at Valdosta. This decision was prompted by the ongoing economic situation, delays imposed by the Federal Aviation Administration (FAA) as part of a runway extension at Valdosta and an attractive offer to relocate from the Quitman municipal government. At Sun 'n Fun 2009 in April the company announced that it expected to start production of AG-5Bs by mid-summer 2009. True Flight exhibited at AirVenture 2009 in July. At Sun 'n Fun in April 2010 the company gave an update on progress, although production had still not commenced at that time.

In July 2012, True Flight Aerospace again exhibited at AirVenture as part of the State of Georgia's Center for Innovation in Aerospace. Production of new aircraft had not yet commenced.

As of December 2021, True Flight Aerospace, in spite of more than ten years of promises, had not produced a single aircraft.

== Aircraft by date ==
- Tiger Aircraft AG-5B Tiger (2001)
