= Sam Aircraft Sam LS =

Canadian light aircraft

Sam LS
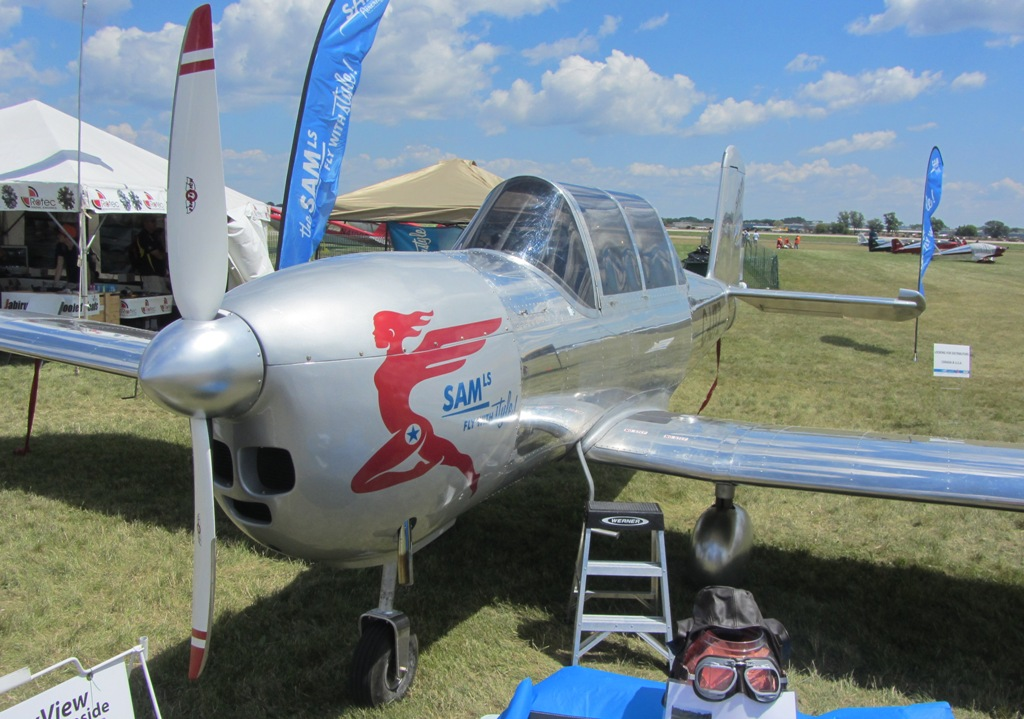

General information
- Type: Advanced Ultralight Aircraft and light sport aircraft
- National origin: Canada
- Manufacturer: Haim Aviation
- Status: Awaiting production commencement
- Number built: one

History
- Manufactured: 2013 (prototypes only)
- First flight: 26 February 2013

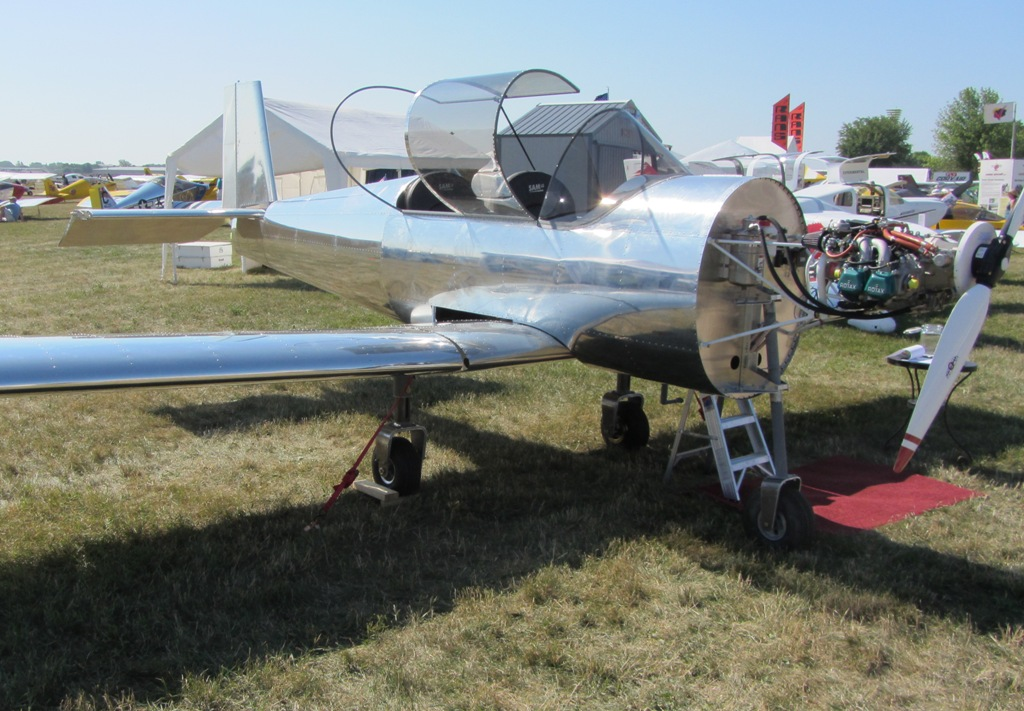
Haim Sam LS prototype

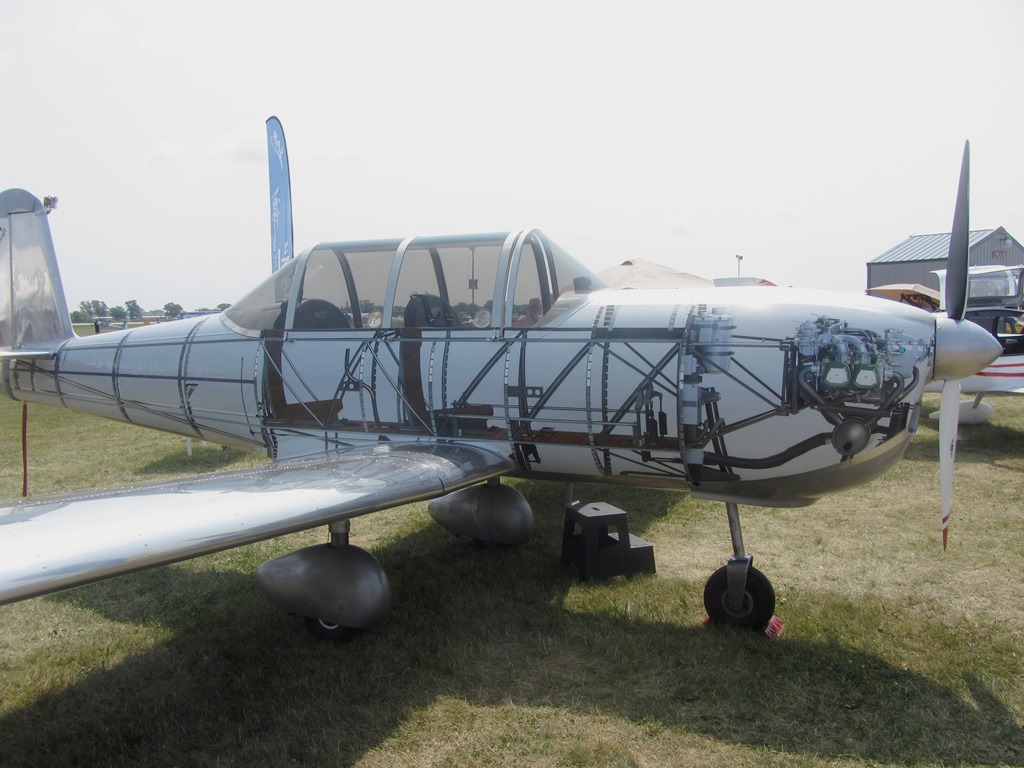
Sam LS side graphic

The Sam Aircraft Sam LS is a Canadian aircraft design, designed and produced by Sam Aircraft, formerly known as Haim Aviation of Lachute, Quebec. The aircraft was designed for the Canadian AULA and American light-sport aircraft rules and had its first flight on 26 February 2013.

== Design and development ==
The Sam LS is a low-wing, tandem seat monoplane. It can be configured for conventional or tricycle landing gear. The fuselage is semi monocoque, with a welded 4130 steel tube protective cockpit cage structure and aluminum skin. Three different wing planforms for light-sport, STOL and amateur-built categories can be installed to a common fuselage. The aircraft can be flown open cockpit with the canopy removed.

Prior to its first flight a prototype was shown at the 2012 EAA airshow.

As of June 2013 the aircraft was on Transport Canada's list of accepted advanced ultralights, but has not completed US Federal Aviation Administration special light-sport aircraft approval.

In July 2013 pricing was announced for kits and sub-kits, including wings, fuselage and empennage. In a break from normal industry practice the company said that it would offer those three sub-kits for a total that was the same as if they were ordered as a single kit, US$29,000. The complete kit with a 100 hp (75 kW) Rotax 912ULS engine and Dynon Skyview avionics was forecast to cost US$65,000 at that time, taking a factory-estimated 900 hours to complete.

By August 2014 the company was up for sale as SAM Aircraft President Thierry Zibi indicated that he would rather develop new designs than run a production operation. Zibi was hoping to find a buyer to produce the aircraft. In November 2015 the rights to the design, parts, jigs, molds, data and the prototype aircraft were being all offered for US$100,000.

In January 2016 Zenith Aircraft announced that it had purchased the Sam design and was planning to produce kits alongside the existing Chris Heintz designs.

== Specifications (Sam LS) ==
Data from Expo LS, Manufacturer

General characteristics

- Crew: one
- Capacity: one passenger
- Length: 6.5 m (21 ft 4 in)
- Wingspan: 8.7 m (28 ft 7 in)
- Wing area: 12.8 m^{2} (138 sq ft)
- Empty weight: 376 kg (829 lb)
- Gross weight: 558 kg (1,230 lb)
- Fuel capacity: 83 litres (18 imp gal; 22 US gal)
- Powerplant: 1 × Rotax 912ULS Horizontally opposed piston aircraft engine, 75 kW (100 hp)
- Propellers: 2-bladed Sensenich, 1.8 m (5 ft 11 in) diameter ground adjustable

Performance

- Cruise speed: 201 km/h (125 mph, 109 kn)
- Stall speed: 78.8 km/h (49.0 mph, 42.5 kn)
- Never exceed speed: 249 km/h (155 mph, 134 kn)
- Range: 724 km (450 mi, 391 nmi)
- Endurance: 4.2hr
- Service ceiling: 4,420 m (14,500 ft)
- Rate of climb: 4.5 m/s (890 ft/min)

Avionics

- Dynon Skyview

== See also ==
Aircraft of comparable role, configuration, and era

- Varga 2150 Kachina
