= Varga 2150 Kachina =

American aircraft

2150 Kachina
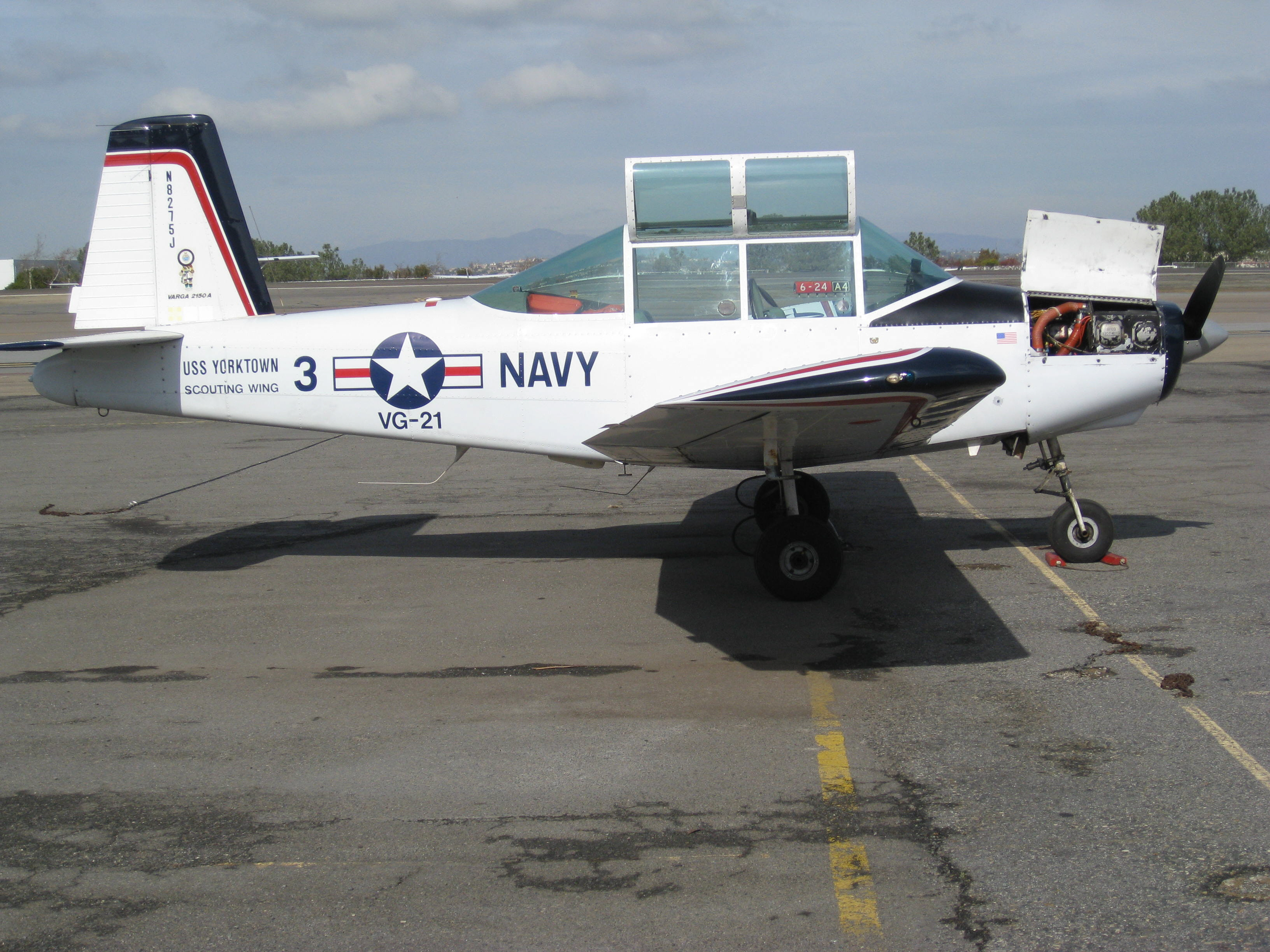
- Varga 2150A Kachina at McClellan-Palomar Airport California in January 2008

General information
- Type: personal, primary trainer
- National origin: United States
- Manufacturer: Morrisey, Shinn, Varga
- Designer: William J. Morrisey

History
- First flight: 1958
- Developed from: Morrisey Nifty

The Varga 2150 Kachina is an American all-metal, low-wing, fixed-gear, two-seat light aircraft fitted with a tricycle undercarriage.

== Design ==
In 1948, American aircraft test pilot/aircraft designer W.J. Morrisey produced a wood-and-fabric light aircraft, the 1000C (Nifty). It did not sell well, so in 1958 he reworked the basic design, giving it an all-metal structure and increased power from a Lycoming O-235 engine. The aircraft is a cantilever low-wing monoplane with plain ailerons and two-position trailing-edge flaps, conventional empennage, fixed nosewheel landing gear, and tandem seating. Dual controls are provided as standard.

== Development ==
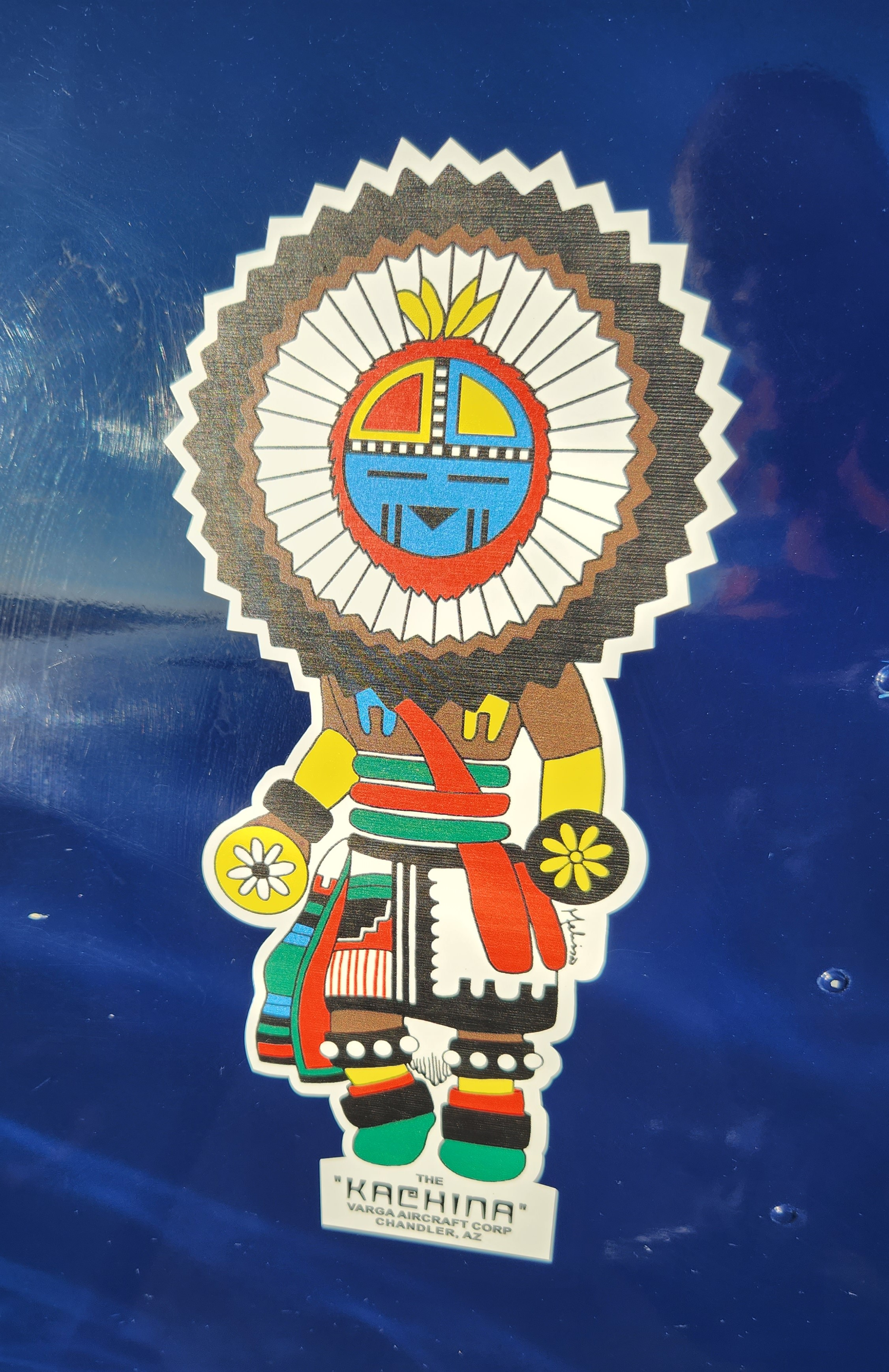
Varga Kachina Logo

In 1958 The Morrisey Aviation Inc. company began building the re-designed aircraft. Two units were completed as the Morrisey 2000. A further improvement came with the Morrisey 2150, incorporating a 108 hp Lycoming O-235 engine. The company had built nine aircraft by the end of 1959.

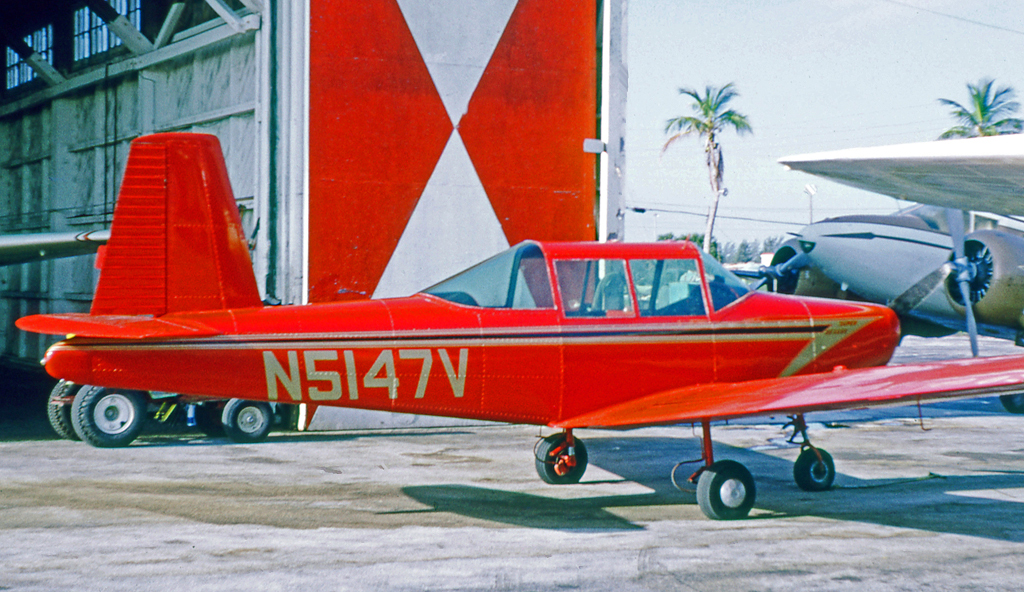
Morrisey 2150A built in 1962.

The construction and design rights were then sold to Shinn Engineering Inc. which built 35 improved Shinn 2150A aircraft with a 150 hp (110 kW) Lycoming O-320-A2C engine (an engine series still in production as of 2025), ceasing production in 1962.

The 2150A design rights were sold in 1967 to used aircraft parts supplier George Varga, who formed the Varga Aircraft Corporation. The Varga 2150A Kachina was built at Chandler, Arizona between 1975 and 1982. 121 examples of the 2150A Kachina and 18 Varga 2180s with a 180 hp Lycoming O-360-A2D engine were completed. A tailwheel option was available as the Varga 2150TG.

Bill Morrisey later re-acquired the design rights and launched a kit version of the original Morrisey 2000C.

The Morrisey/Shinn/Varga 2150 remains in widespread use in the US, and several aircraft are flown in Europe and South America.

== Variants ==
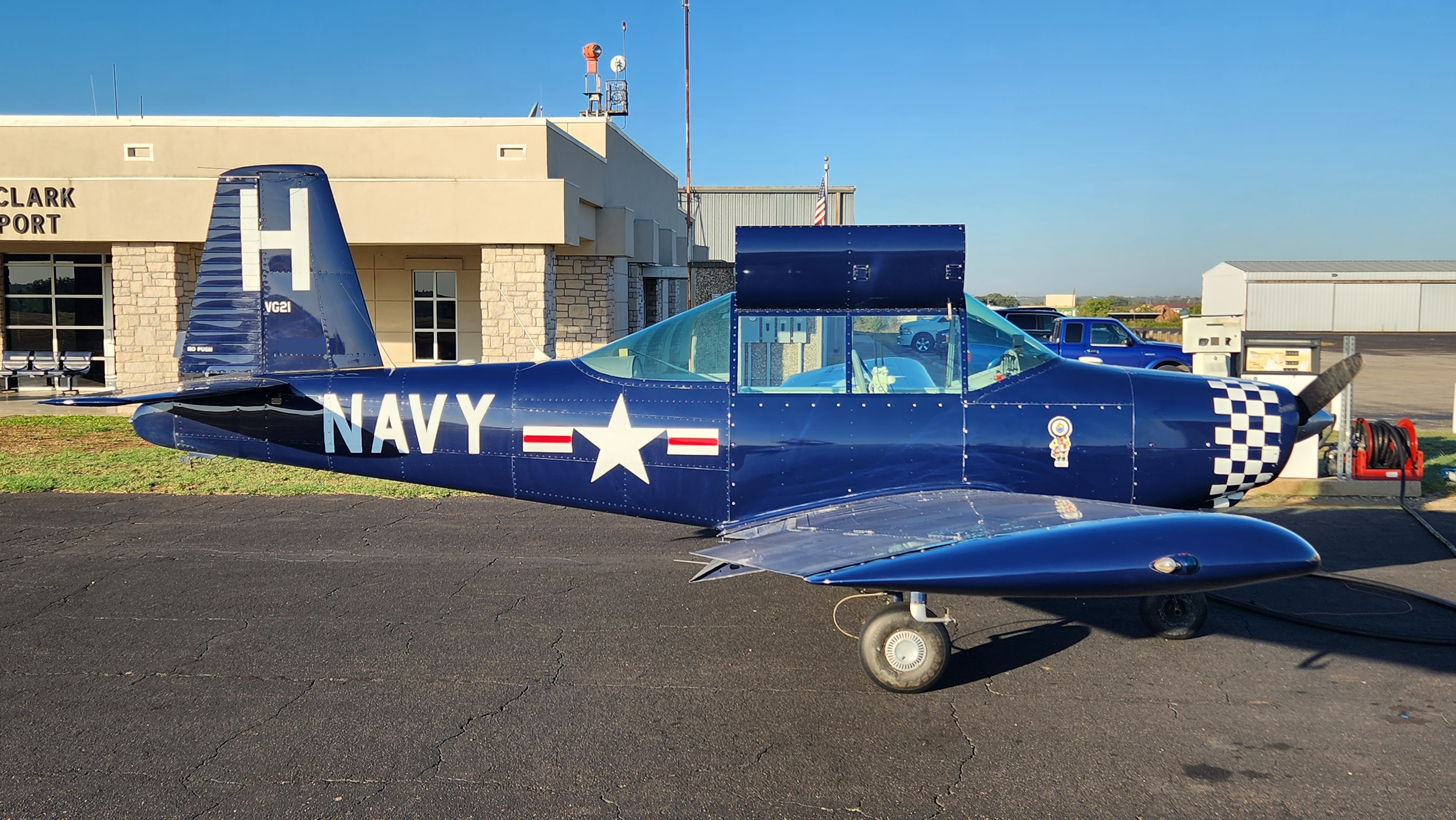
Varga Kachina parked on the ramp of Stephenville Clark Regional Airport.

Morrisey 2000C
Variant with Lycoming O-235 engine
Morrisey 2150
Variant with Lycoming O-320-A2C engine.
Shinn 2150
Morrisey 2150 built by Shinn Engineering.
Varga 2150A Kachina
Morrisey 2150 built by Varga Aircraft.
Varga 2150TG
Tailwheel version of the 2150A
Varga 2180 Kachina
Variant with Lycoming O-360-A2D engine.

== Specifications (2150A) ==
Data from Jane's All the World's Aircraft 1982-83

General characteristics

- Crew: 2
- Length: 21 ft 2 in (6.45 m)
- Wingspan: 30 ft 0 in (9.14 m)
- Height: 7 ft 0 in (2.13 m)
- Wing area: 144 sq ft (13.38 m^{2})
- Airfoil: NACA 43015
- Empty weight: 1,125 lb (510 kg)
- Max takeoff weight: 1,817 lb (824 kg) normal category
- Fuel capacity: 35 US gal (29 imp gal; 130 L)
- Powerplant: 1 × Lycoming O-320-A2C 4-cylinder air-cooled horizontally-opposed piston engine, 150 hp (112 kW)
- Propellers: 2-bladed Sensenich M74DM fixed pitch propeller, 6 ft 2 in (1.88 m) diameter

Performance

- Maximum speed: 128 kn (147 mph, 237 km/h)
- Cruise speed: 117 kn (135 mph, 217 km/h) 75% power
- Stall speed: 45 kn (52 mph, 83 km/h) flaps down
- Never exceed speed: 147.5 kn (170 mph, 273 km/h)
- Range: 455 nmi (524 mi, 843 km)
- Service ceiling: 22,000 ft (6,700 m)
- Rate of climb: 1,450 ft/min (7.4 m/s)
- Take-off run to 50 ft (15 m): 440 ft (134 m)
- Landing run from 50 ft (15 m): 450 ft (137 m)

== See also ==
Aircraft of comparable role, configuration, and era

- Haim Sam LS
