= Zenair CH 640 =

Canadian homebuilt light aircraft

CH 640
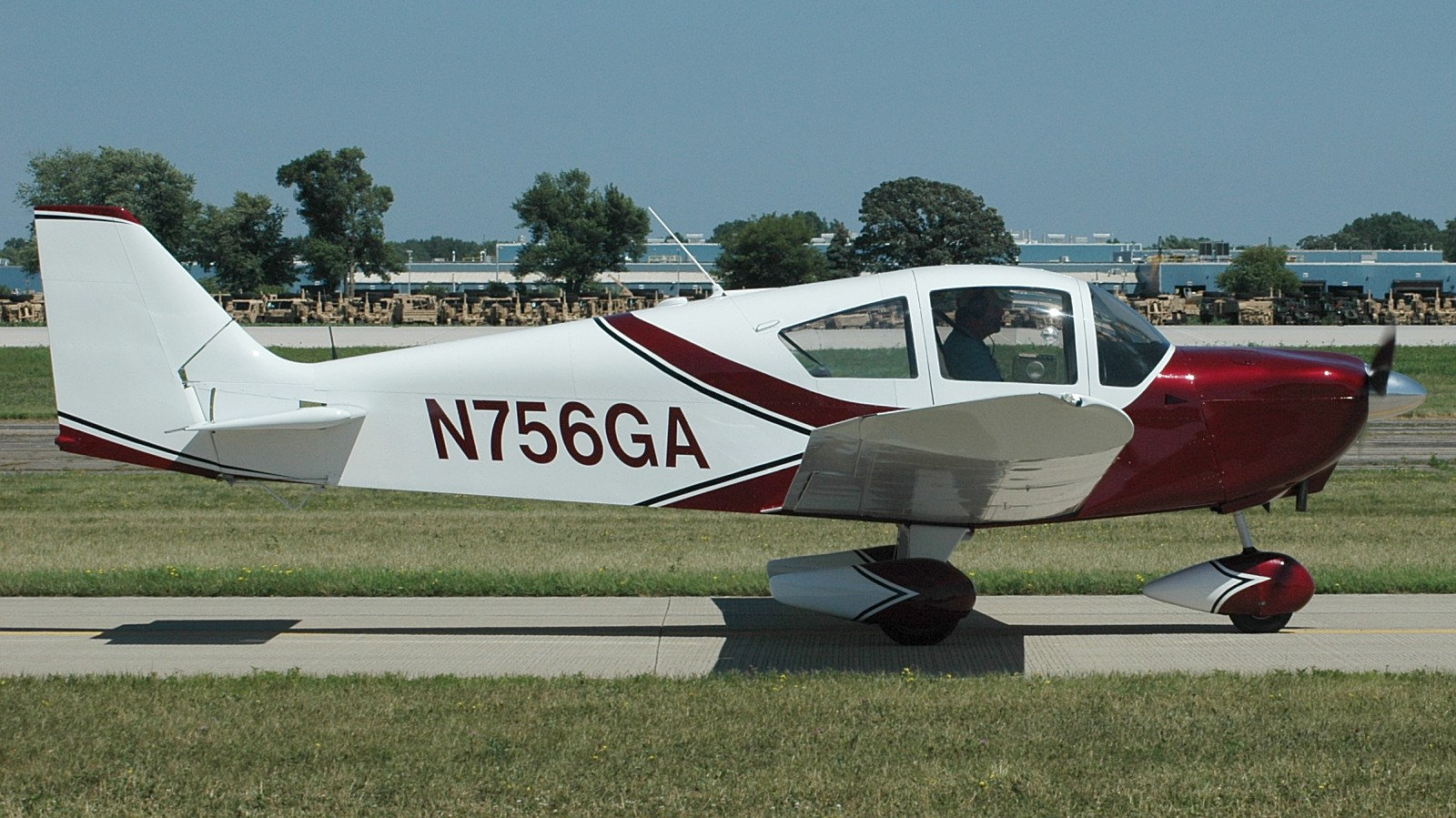

General information
- Type: Kit aircraft
- National origin: Canada
- Manufacturer: Zenair
- Designer: Chris Heintz
- Status: In production
- Number built: 50 (Dec 2011)

History
- Developed from: AMD Alarus

The Zenair Zodiac CH 640 is a Canadian light aircraft that was designed by Chris Heintz and is produced by Zenair in the form of a kit for amateur construction.

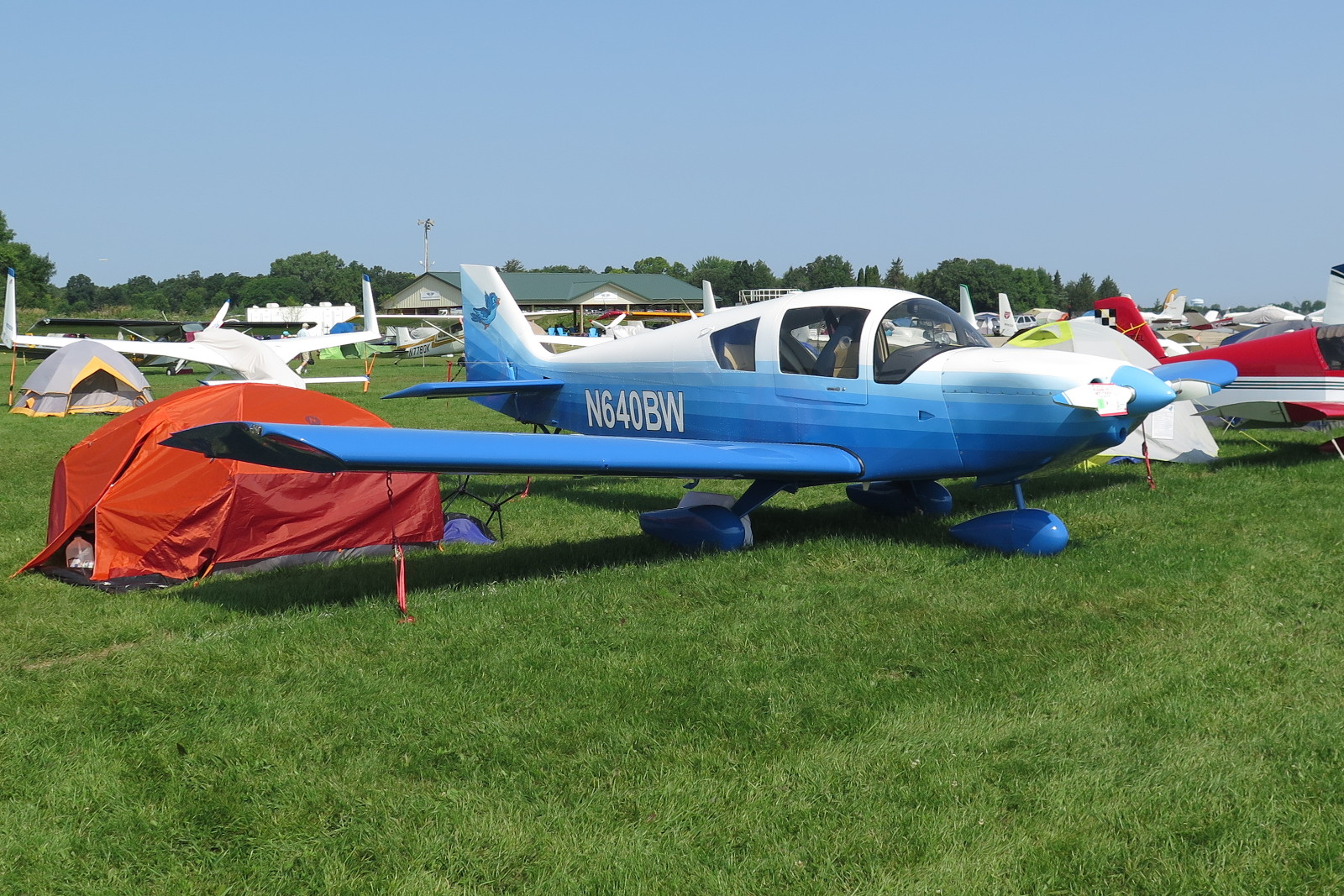
Zenith CH-640

== Design and development ==
The CH 640 was developed from the two-seat type certified AMD Alarus, also called the Zenair CH 2000, by increasing the span of the wings and stabilator, to accommodate the larger engine and increase in gross weight. The design was also influenced by the Zenith CH 601 and the Zenair CH 300. The design goals were to produce a simple four-seat aircraft capable of flying cross country flights with full seats.

The CH 640 is a four-seat, low-wing touring aircraft with tricycle landing gear and a single engine in tractor configuration. It has a standard empty weight of 1,147 lb (520 kg), a gross weight of 2,200 lb (998 kg) and an acceptable engine power range of 150 to 240 hp (112 to 179 kW). The recommended engine is the Lycoming O-360 of 180 hp (134 kW).

The aircraft is made from 6061-T6 aluminum. Its 31.5 ft (9.6 m) span wing is a cantilever structure and is equipped with flaps. The 46 in (116.8 cm) wide cabin is accessed via two gull-winged doors. The construction time from the factory-supplied standard kit is estimated at 1250 hours to complete and the quick-build kit at 750 hours. In 2011 the kit cost US$28,995, while finishing a completed aircraft was estimated to cost between US$45,000 to $99,000, depending on options, engine and avionics installed. In December 2011 there were 50 completed and flying.

== Operational history ==
In evaluating the CH 640 AeroNews Network said, "It's a tremendously stable little airplane and a fair amount faster than what you might think."

== Specifications (CH 640) ==
Data from Kitplanes

General characteristics

- Crew: one
- Capacity: three passengers
- Length: 23 ft 0 in (7.01 m)
- Wingspan: 31 ft 6 in (9.60 m)
- Height: 7 ft 4 in (2.24 m)
- Wing area: 150 sq ft (14 m^{2})
- Empty weight: 1,147 lb (520 kg)
- Gross weight: 2,200 lb (998 kg)
- Fuel capacity: standard tanks: 38 U.S. gallons (140 L; 32 imp gal), optional tanks: 46 U.S. gallons (170 L; 38 imp gal)
- Powerplant: 1 × Lycoming O-360 four cylinder, horizontally opposed, four-stroke piston engine, 180 hp (130 kW)
- Propellers: 2-bladed metal propeller

Performance

- Maximum speed: 160 mph (260 km/h, 140 kn)
- Cruise speed: 150 mph (240 km/h, 130 kn)
- Stall speed: 47 mph (76 km/h, 41 kn) flaps down
- Never exceed speed: 175 mph (282 km/h, 152 kn)
- Range: 510 mi (820 km, 440 nmi)
- g limits: +5.7/-2.9
- Rate of climb: 950 ft/min (4.8 m/s)
- Wing loading: 14.6 lb/sq ft (71 kg/m^{2})
