= Zenith Gemini CH-620 =

Type of aircraft

Gemini CH 620

General information
- Type: Twin engined touring light aircraft
- National origin: Canada
- Manufacturer: Zenith Aircraft
- Designer: Chris Heintz
- Number built: 1

History
- First flight: 23 July 1996

The Zenith Gemini CH 620 is a twin engine, two seat, light aircraft, designed to be competitive in the single engine market. The Canadian designed Gemini flew in 1996 but kit production has not been started.

== Design and development ==
The compact Gemini is a Chris Heintz (of Zenair Co., Canada) designed twin engined two seater with a wingspan only 3 in (76 mm) greater than that of the Zenith Zodiac, with which it shares many components. Its square tipped low wings are built around a single spar and, like the rest of the Gemini, are stressed aluminium skinned. Most of the taper is on the trailing edges, which carry mass balanced ailerons over almost all the span outboard of the engines. The two Jabiru 2200 flat four engines are mounted in front of the leading edge, under long over-wing cowlings; the starboard engine is toed-out by 2.5°. The tailplane is rectangular in plan, the separate, mass balanced elevators having a cut-out for the movement of a tall, tapered, all-moving rudder. The port elevator carries a trim tab.

The Gemini's semi-monocoque fuselage is flat sided, though rounded decking merges from behind into a smooth single piece canopy over the cabin, where two sit side-by side. The prototype has a tailwheel undercarriage, though later aircraft could have tricycle gear. The tailwheel is fixed but the mainwheels retract backwards into the engine nacelles, leaving the wheels slightly protruding in case of a wheels-up landing.

The Gemini first flew on 23 July 1996. Since then the development pace has been slow, with the company's focus elsewhere. There has been discussion of a revised airfoil section and uprated Jabiru engines. As of 2000, there was no indication of a date set for kit production.

== Specifications ==
Data from Jane's All the World's Aircraft 2000/01

General characteristics

- Capacity: 2
- Length: 19 ft 0 in (5.79 m)
- Wingspan: 27 ft 3 in (8.31 m)
- Height: 5 ft 10 in (1.78 m)
- Wing area: 123.0 sq ft (11.43 m^{2})
- Empty weight: 800 lb (363 kg)
- Max takeoff weight: 1,450 lb (658 kg)
- Powerplant: 2 × Jabiru 2200 air cooled flat four, 80 hp (60 kW) each
- Propellers: 2-bladed 2 blade fixed pitch, 4 ft 7 in (1.40 m) diameter

Performance

- Maximum speed: 155 mph (249 km/h, 135 kn)
- Cruise speed: 145 mph (233 km/h, 126 kn) at 75% power
- Stall speed: 55 mph (89 km/h, 48 kn) flaps down
- Range: 650 mi (1,050 km, 560 nmi) no reserves
- Service ceiling: 16,000 ft (4,900 m) service
- Rate of climb: 1,280 ft/min (6.5 m/s)
