= Zenair CH 180 =

General information
- Type: Homebuilt light aircraft
- National origin: Canada
- Manufacturer: Zenair
- Designer: Chris Heintz

History
- First flight: 1982
- Developed from: Zenair CH 150

The Zenair CH 180 Super Acro-Z is an aerobatic light aircraft, that was designed by Chris Heintz and built by Zenair in the 1980s.

== Specifications ==
Data from Jane's All the World's Aircraft 1992-93

General characteristics

- Crew: 1
- Length: 20 ft 3 in (6.17 m)
- Wingspan: 20 ft 2 in (6.15 m)
- Height: 5 ft 5 in (1.65 m)
- Wing area: 85 sq ft (7.9 m^{2})
- Airfoil: NACA 0015
- Empty weight: 800 lb (363 kg)
- Max takeoff weight: 1,150 lb (522 kg)
- Fuel capacity: 27 imp gal (32 US gal; 120 L) in two fuselage tanks
- Powerplant: 1 × Textron Lycoming IO-360 4-cylinder air-cooled horizontally-opposed piston engine, 150 hp (110 kW) with fuel injection
- Propellers: 2-bladed fixed-pitch propeller

Performance

- Cruise speed: 165 kn (190 mph, 306 km/h)
- Stall speed: 42 kn (48 mph, 78 km/h)
- Range: 565 nmi (650 mi, 1,046 km) with max fuel 55% power
- Service ceiling: 16,000 ft (4,900 m)
- g limits: ±8 normal (±12 ultimate)
- Roll rate: 270°/s
- Rate of climb: 3,000 ft/min (15 m/s)

== See also ==
Related development

- Zenair CH 150
