= Zenair CH 50 Mini-Z =

1979 prototype of sport aircraft from Canada

CH 50 Mini-Z

General information
- Type: Sport aircraft
- National origin: Canada
- Designer: Chris Heintz
- Number built: 1

History
- First flight: 1979

The Zenair CH 50 Mini-Z is a single-seat light aircraft built by Chris Heintz in Canada in the late 1970s. Heintz sold plans and kits of many of his designs through his company Zenair for amateur construction, but the CH 50 was never brought to market, and remained a prototype only.

== Design and development ==
The CH 50 is a low-wing, cantilever monoplane of conventional design, with an open cockpit for the pilot. It has a conventional tail and fixed, tailwheel undercarriage. Power is supplied by a piston engine in the nose, driving a tractor propeller. Construction is of metal throughout, and the wings are removable.

In a history of his designs, Heintz described the CH 50 as an offshoot of the development of the CH 100 Mono-Z. Construction of the prototype began in February 1978, and the aircraft first flew in 1979. It received Canadian registration C-GTZI in June 1979 under Transport Canada's CAR 549 regulation for amateur-built aircraft.

Heintz notes work on the CH 50 ending in 1981, and Jane's All The World's Aircraft ceased listing the type after its 1984–85 edition. In 2024, the prototype remains on the Canadian registry.

== Specifications ==
Data from Taylor 1984, p.526–27

General characteristics

- Crew: 1 pilot
- Wingspan: 5.70 m (18 ft 8 in)
- Height: 1.60 m (5 ft 3 in) (approximate)
- Wing area: 6.20 m^{2} (66.7 sq ft)
- Empty weight: 140 kg (309 lb)
- Max takeoff weight: 252 kg (556 lb)
- Powerplant: 1 × Cuyuna two-cylinder, two-stroke engine, 18 kW (24 hp)

Performance

- Maximum speed: 148 km/h (92 mph, 80 kn)
- Cruise speed: 138 km/h (86 mph, 75 kn)
- Range: 354 km (220 mi, 191 nmi)
- Rate of climb: 2.75 m/s (541 ft/min)

== Notes ==
=== Bibliography ===
- "CCAR - Aircraft Details". Transport Canada. 28 August 2013.
- Fortier, Rénald (23 August 2020). "Born in a garage, but now all the world is a market for Zenair Limited: A look at the Cold War era designs of Christophe Jean Heintz, Part 1". Ingenium Channel. Ottawa: Ingenium.
- Heintz, Chris (2011). Flying on your own Wings (third ed.). Victoria, Canada: Trafford.
- Lambert, Mark; Munson, Kenneth; Taylor, Michael J.H., eds. (1991). Jane's All the World's Aircraft 1991-92. Coulson, Surrey, UK: Jane's Information Group.
- Taylor, John W.R., ed. (1984). Jane's All the World's Aircraft 1984-85. London: Jane's Publishing.
- Taylor, Michael J. H. (1993). Jane's Encyclopedia of Aviation. London: Studio Editions.
