= Aircraft Manufacturing and Design =

Aircraft manufacturer

- Company type: private
- Industry: Aerospace
- Founded: 1995
- Headquarters: Eastman, Georgia, United States
- Products: General aviation aircraft
- Parent: Zenair (formerly)
- Website: www.newplane.com

Aircraft Manufacturing and Design Co. (AMD) is an aircraft manufacturer that formerly produced three aircraft- the Alarus CH2000, the Zodiac CH601, and the Patriot 150.

The CH2000 is a two-seat, single engine aircraft used primarily for flight training purposes. The CH601 is a two-seat light sport aircraft in the United States of America and an AULA in Canada and is used mainly as a personal aircraft. The Patriot 150 is a two-seat, high-winged SLSA with STOL performance. Unlike the other SLSA (Zodiac), the Patriot is not available as a kit; only as a ready-to-fly SLSA.

The company is headquartered in Eastman, Georgia, USA.

== History ==
Founded in 1974 by aeronautical engineer Chris Heintz, Zenair, Ltd. of Midland, Ontario, Canada began its presence in the light aircraft industry with a single aircraft design, the ZENITH CH 200. This two-seat kit aircraft was designed by Heintz during the sixties while he was chief engineer at French aircraft manufacturer Avions Pierre Robin. The ZENITH was an all-metal two-seat low-wing monoplane, designed to be simple and affordable: Simple because Heintz was an engineer and not a craftsman, and affordable because he was raising a family with five children while building the prototype.

Since 1974, Heintz has designed and developed more than 12 new aircraft models which have been marketed and sold as kit aircraft around the world. Among them was the Zenair ZENITH CH2000. This aircraft, based on Heintz' kit aircraft CH640 design, received FAA type certification on July 25, 1995. This type-certified aircraft was renamed and is now manufactured as the AMD Alarus CH2000.

Recently, the company changed hands. Where the original company was owned by a member of the Heintz family (and known as Aircraft Manufacturing and Development, Inc.), the new company was created by the existing executive team and incorporated in Georgia, USA as a Limited Liability Company named Aircraft Manufacturing and Design, LLC. The new company retained the "AMD" shorthand and very similar logos. The new company also took over the responsibility for all the previous AMD's Zodiacs; but not the Alarus. And, the new AMD will be producing the Patriot.

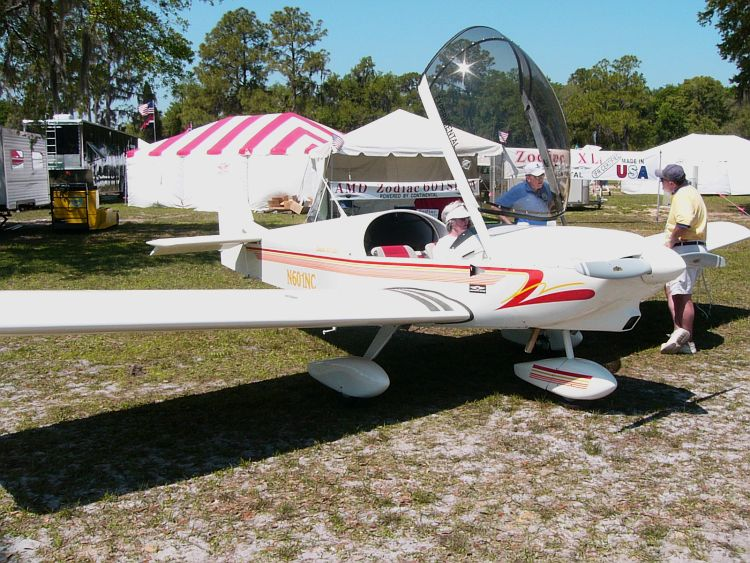
AMD Zodiac

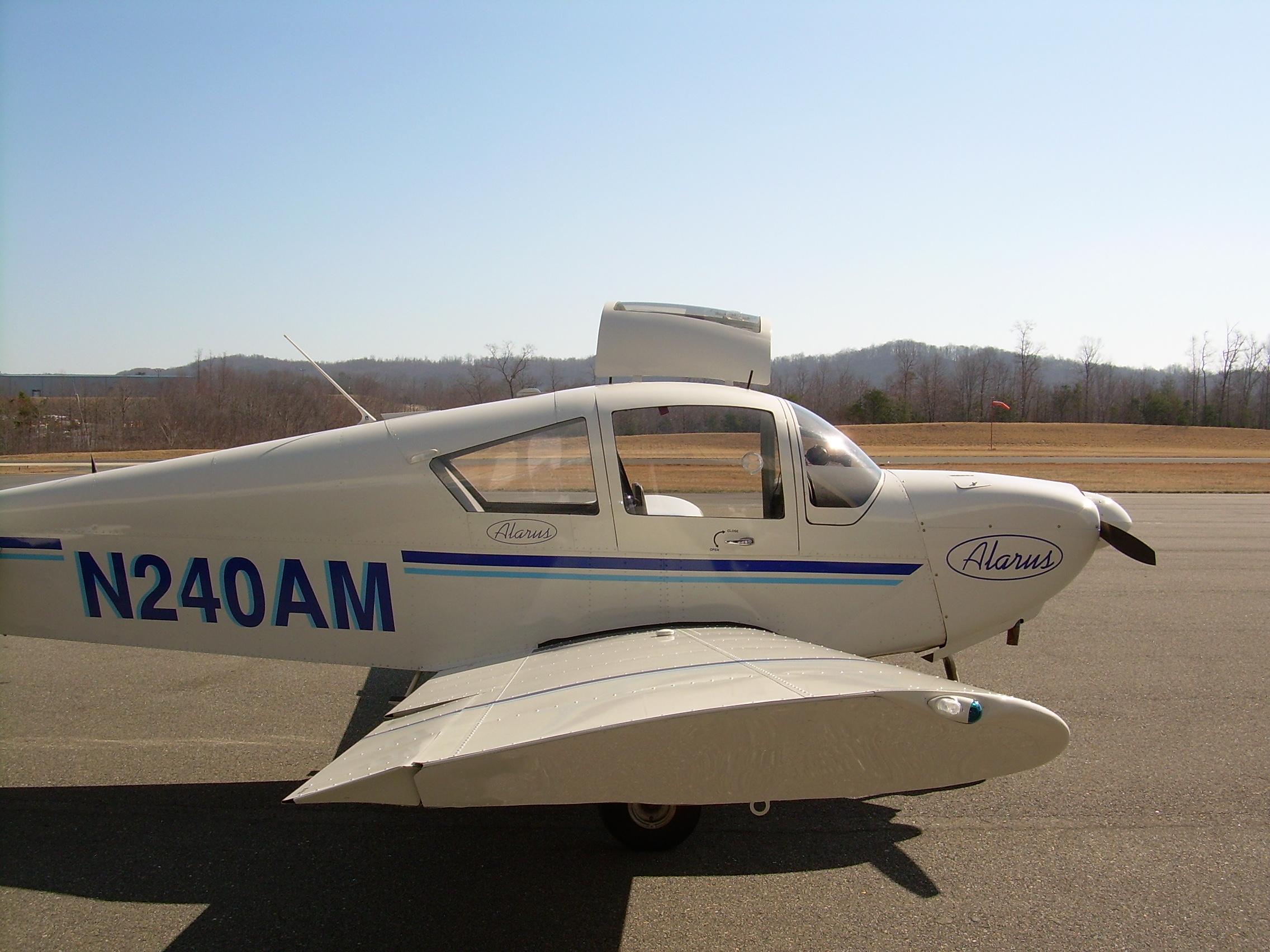
AMD Alarus
