= AMD Alarus =

Single-engine monoplane in the Iraqi Air Force

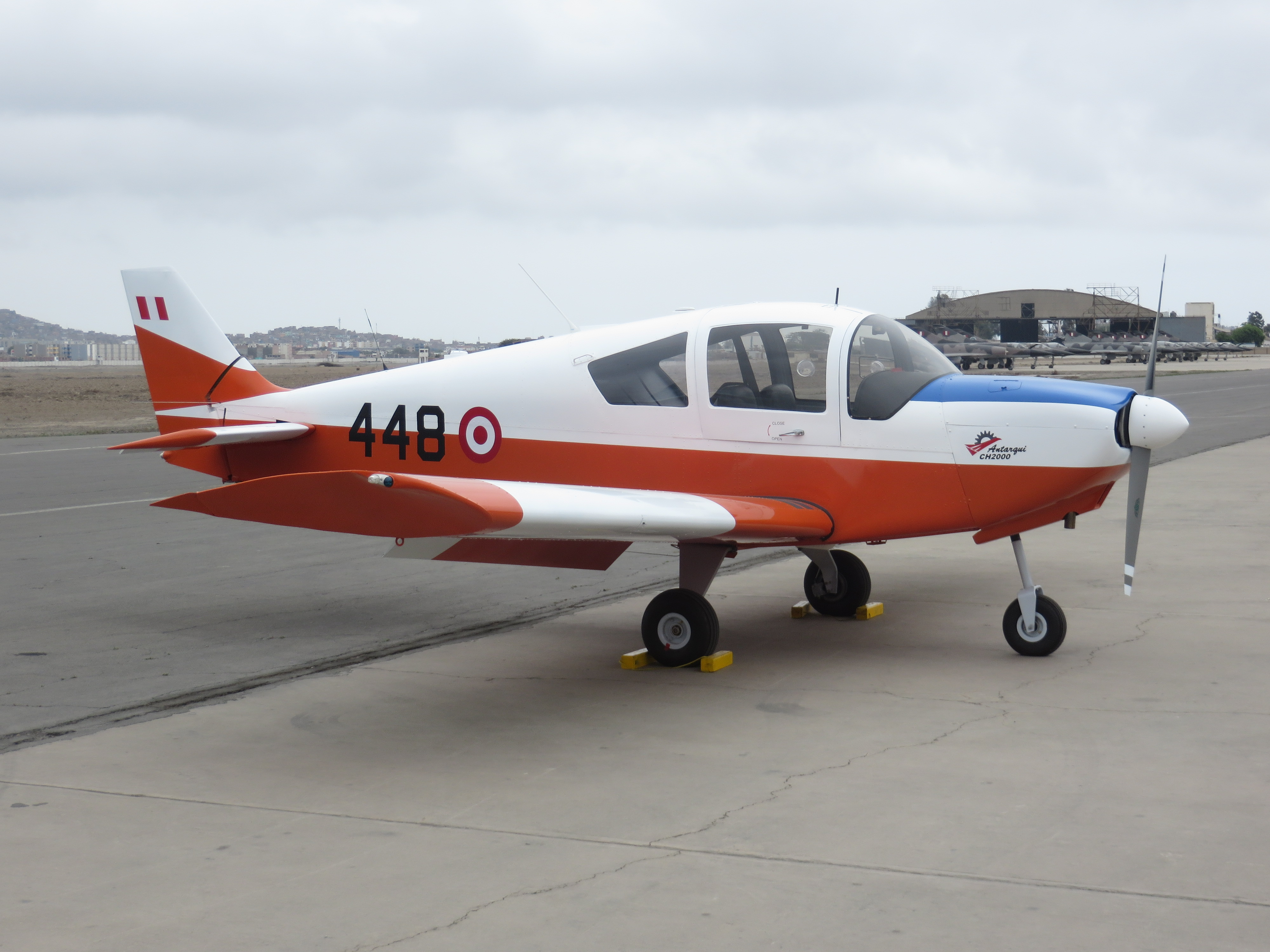
- Peruvian Air Force AMD Alarus CH2000 Antarqui, built under license by SEMAN

General information
- Type: Personal use & Trainer aircraft
- Manufacturer: Aircraft Manufacturing and Development
- Designer: Chris Heintz, Zenair
- Status: Production completed
- Primary user: Iraqi Air Force

History
- Introduction date: 1995
- Variant: Zenair CH 640

The AMD Alarus is a light aircraft produced in two variants, one for general aviation and the other for military use.

The Alarus is based upon the earlier Zenair CH2000 which was built by Zenair in Canada from 1995 to 1999. In 2000 AMD began production of the Alarus in the USA.

The Alarus features Garmin avionics and a 46-inch-wide (1,200 mm) cabin.

As of 2011 the aircraft is no longer in production by AMD, although Zenair provides parts support.

== Variants ==
The Alarus was offered in two variants: the AMD Alarus CH2000 general aviation aircraft and the SAMA CH2000 Military Tactical Surveillance Aircraft (MTSA).

=== Alarus CH2000 ===
The AMD Alarus CH2000 general aviation aircraft includes the CH 2000 Trainer. It is a single-engine, fixed gear, low wing monoplane of all metal construction. It has two place side by side seating with dual flight controls, and a forty pound baggage capacity.

=== SAMA CH2000 ===
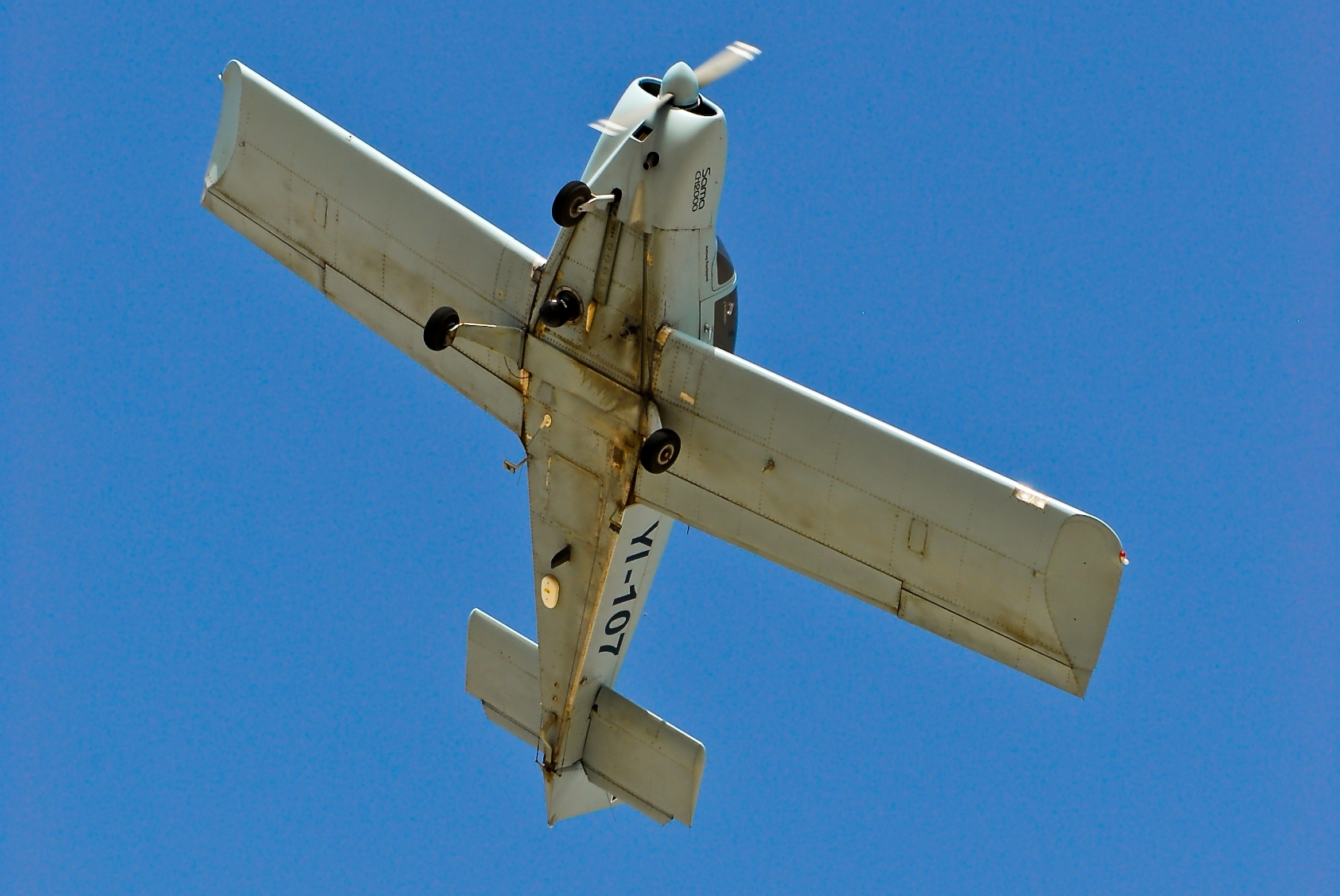
Iraqi SAMA CH2000 of the 70th Squadron, with the FLIR sensor visible below the fuselage

The SAMA CH2000 is a military surveillance variant of the Alarus. It is equipped with forward-looking infrared – a multi sensor imager offering high performance, precision and high level imaging.

The aircraft is also equipped with state-of-the-art communications systems for secure air-to-air and air-to-ground communications and is equipped for day and night missions. The aircraft is manufactured in Amman, Jordan and Baghdad, Iraq.

The United States Army acquired 8 aircraft at a cost of US$5.8M for the Iraqi Air Force in 2004, and the first two SAMA CH2000s were delivered on 18 January 2005. The first four CH2000s were used by the 3rd Squadron, based at Kirkuk Air Base, and the others by the 70th Squadron at Basra International Airport. In 2008, following the service entry of the Cessna 208 in the Iraqi Air Force, SAMA CH2000s used by the 3rd Squadron were transferred to the 70th Squadron.

=== Zenair CH 640 ===
The four seat kit aircraft derivative of the Alarus is the Zenair CH 640.

== Operators ==
The Alarus is used by some flight schools in the United States.

In February 2008 there were 113 CH2000 Alarus registered in the USA and four in Canada.

The first military user of the CH2000 was the Iraqi Air Force, currently operating 8 aircraft.

The Peruvian Air Force will receive six CH2000s built under licence by SEMAN with some custom modifications. The Peruvian version is called the Antarqui (which was a special elite of Chasqui messengers in service with the Inca Empire, that are believed to have used a paragliding device to jump from one hill to another).

== Military operators ==
Iraq

- Iraqi Air Force - 70th Squadron

Peru

- Peruvian Air Force

== Specifications ==
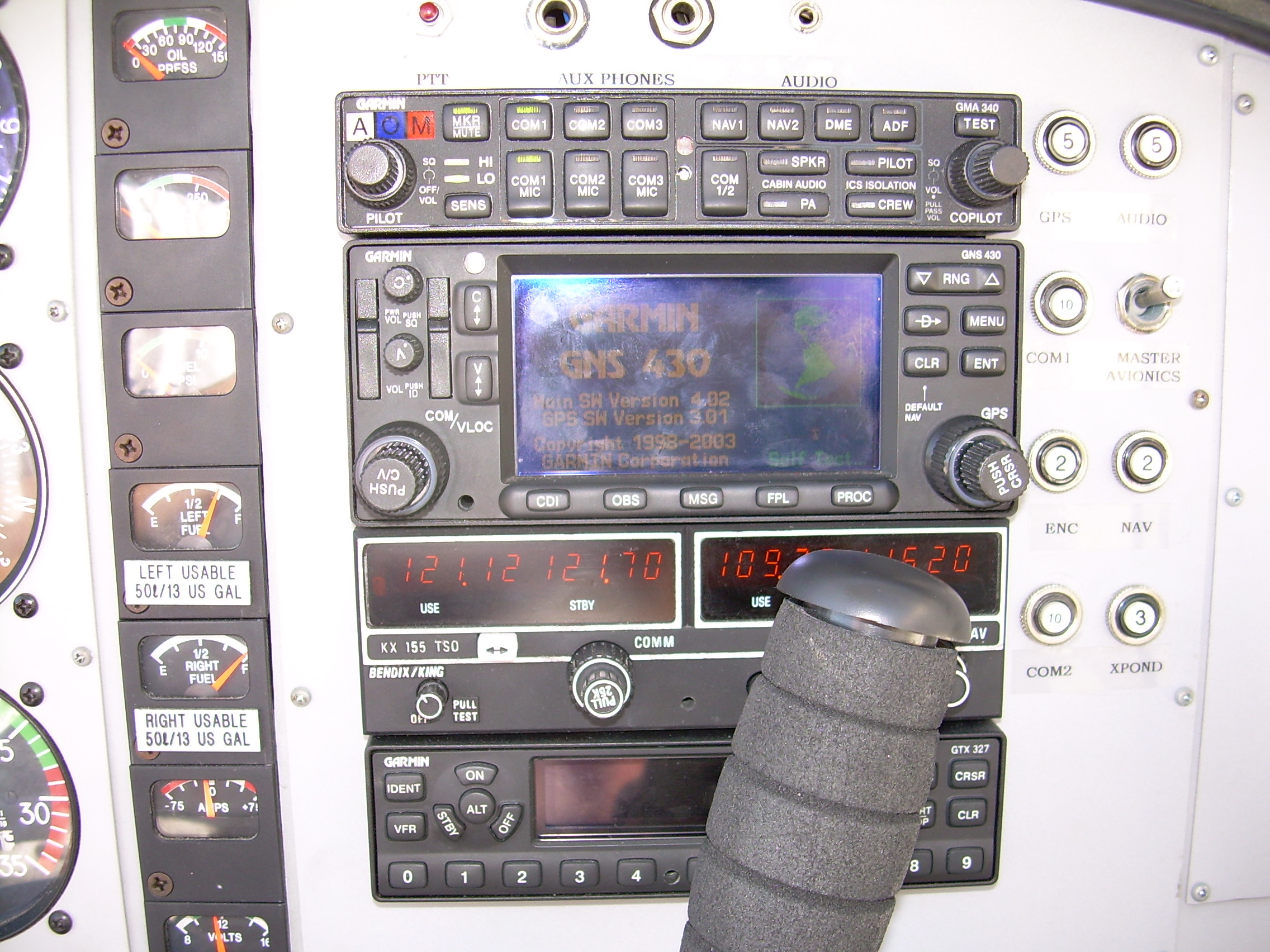
Center panel and radio stack

Data from AMD Website

General characteristics

- Crew: one
- Capacity: one passenger
- Length: 23 ft 0 in (7.01 m)
- Wingspan: 28 ft 10 in (8.79 m)
- Height: 6 ft 10 in (2.08 m)
- Wing area: 137 sq ft (12.7 m^{2})
- Empty weight: 1,085 lb (492 kg) basic VFR-equipped
- Max takeoff weight: 1,692 lb (767 kg)
- Fuel capacity: 28 US Gallons (106 litres)
- Powerplant: 1 × Lycoming O-235-N2C four cylinder, horizontally opposed, four stroke aircraft engine, 116 hp (87 kW)
- Propellers: 2-bladed Sensenich fixed pitch, 6 ft 0 in (1.83 m) diameter

Performance

- Cruise speed: 99 kn (114 mph, 183 km/h)
- Stall speed: 48 kn (55 mph, 89 km/h)
- Never exceed speed: 143 kn (165 mph, 265 km/h)
- Range: 486 nmi (559 mi, 900 km)
- g limits: +4.4/-2.2 (utility category 1,606 lbs) +3.8/-1.9 (normal category 1,692 lbs)
- Rate of climb: 750 ft/min (3.8 m/s)
- Wing loading: 12.3 lb/sq ft (60 kg/m^{2})
- Power/mass: 14.6 lb/hp (0.11 kW/kg)

Avionics

- Garmin GNS 430 (COM, GPS, VOR, GS)
- Garmin GI-106A VOR with GS slope
- Garmin 340 audio panel
- Garmin GTX 327 transponder/encoder
- Bendix/king KX 155 NAV COM
- Bendix/king KI 209 VOR with GS

== See also ==
- AMD Patriot

Related development

- Zenair CH 300
