= Zenair CH 150 =

Canadian homebuilt light aircraft

CH 150

General information
- Type: Homebuilt light aircraft
- National origin: Canada
- Manufacturer: Zenair
- Designer: Chris Heintz

History
- Introduction date: 1980
- First flight: 1980
- Developed from: Zenair CH 100

The Zenith CH 150 Acro Zenith is a Canadian single-engine, low wing, all-aluminum aircraft designed by Chris Heintz and produced by Zenair in kit form for amateur construction. The aircraft is intended for aerobatic use and was introduced at the Experimental Aircraft Association convention in 1980.

The CH 150 is one of only six amateur-built aircraft types specifically approved by Transport Canada for aerobatics, without other restrictions.

== Development ==
After emigrating to Canada and setting up Zenair to sell plans and kits for amateur construction of his Zenith two seat-light aircraft, the German aircraft designer Chris Heintz started design of a smaller, single seat development of the Zenith, the Zenair CH 100 Mono-Zenith. The first CH 100 made its maiden flight on 8 May 1975, powered by a 55 hp (41 kW) Volkswagen air-cooled engine of 1600 cc. Heintz used the Mono-Zenith as a starting point to develop a single-seat aircraft for aerobatic training and competition flying, the resulting aircraft, the CH 150 Acro-Zenith making its maiden flight on 19 May 1980. It was designed to be powered by engines of between 100 and 180 hp (75–134 kW) and had a tailwheel undercarriage instead of the nosewheel undercarriage of the earlier aircraft. Zenair continued to produce kits until 1988.

In a 1983 advertisement Zenair described the design goals of the CH150:

A dandy little aircraft for the serious student in aerobatics. The Acro Zenith has strength for learning and competition (+/-12G). Light on the controls and beautiful to fly. Discover how it does things best - Lady flyers especially will find its roll and pitch forces easy on the arms. Approved for all aerobatic maneuvres - fully inverted system. Suitable for engines from 115 to 180 HP to give marvelous inexpensive flying to any aerobatic pilot.

== Specifications Zenair CH-150 ==
Data from Jane's All The World's Aircraft 1982–83

General characteristics

- Crew: 1
- Length: 6.17 m (20 ft 3 in)
- Wingspan: 6.15 m (20 ft 2 in)
- Height: 1.52 m (5 ft 0 in)
- Empty weight: 331 kg (730 lb)
- Max takeoff weight: 522 kg (1,150 lb)
- Powerplant: 1 × Lycoming 0-320 , 110 kW (150 hp)

Performance

- Maximum speed: 280 km/h (170 mph, 150 kn)
- Cruise speed: 257 km/h (160 mph, 139 kn)
- Stall speed: 89 km/h (55 mph, 48 kn)
- Range: 1,220 km (760 mi, 660 nmi)
- Service ceiling: 4,900 m (16,000 ft)
- Rate of climb: 11 m/s (2,200 ft/min)

== See also ==
Related development

- Zenair CH 200
