= Chris Heintz (aeronautical engineer) =

Canadian aircraft designer (1938–2021)

- Born: November 21, 1938; France
- Died: April 30, 2021 (aged 82); France
- Citizenship: French and Canadian
- Education: ETH Zurich
- Occupation: Aeronautical engineer
- Known for: Light aircraft designs
- Spouse: Annemarie Heintz
- Children: Michael Heintz; Sebastien Heintz
- Parents: Erwin Heintz (father); Magda Heintz (mother)
- Website: www.zenithair.com/c-heintz.html

Chris Heintz (21 November 1938 – 30 April 2021) was a French and Canadian aeronautical engineer, known for his kit aircraft designs.

== Early life ==
Heintz was born in eastern France on 21 November 1938, near the border with Germany, just two years before the May 1940 German invasion of France. His parents were Erwin Heintz, a scientific researcher, and Magda Heintz, an ophthalmologist. His childhood included a wide exposure to scientific and creative endeavours.

Heintz's first language was Alsatian, but he learned French and German when young and English after moving to Canada.

== Education ==
Heintz attended ETH Zurich in Switzerland and completed their aeronautical engineering program. His family noted that he "helped pay for his studies by performing magic shows on city squares that included daring sword-swallowing feats as well as fire-eating routines."

== Career ==
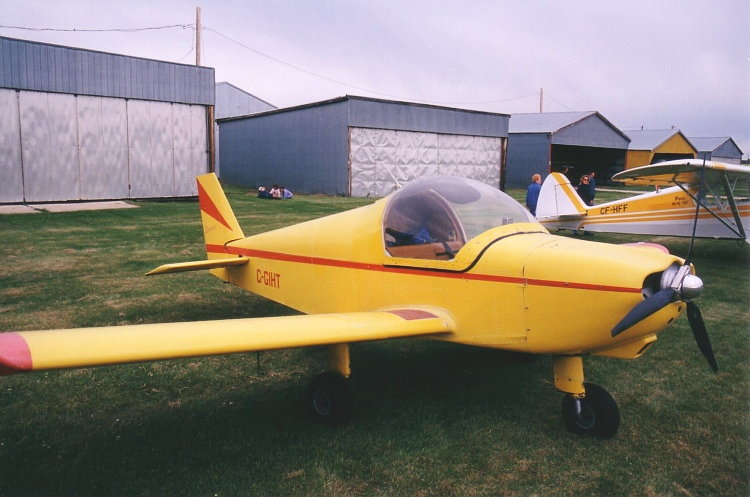
Zenair CH 200 Zenith

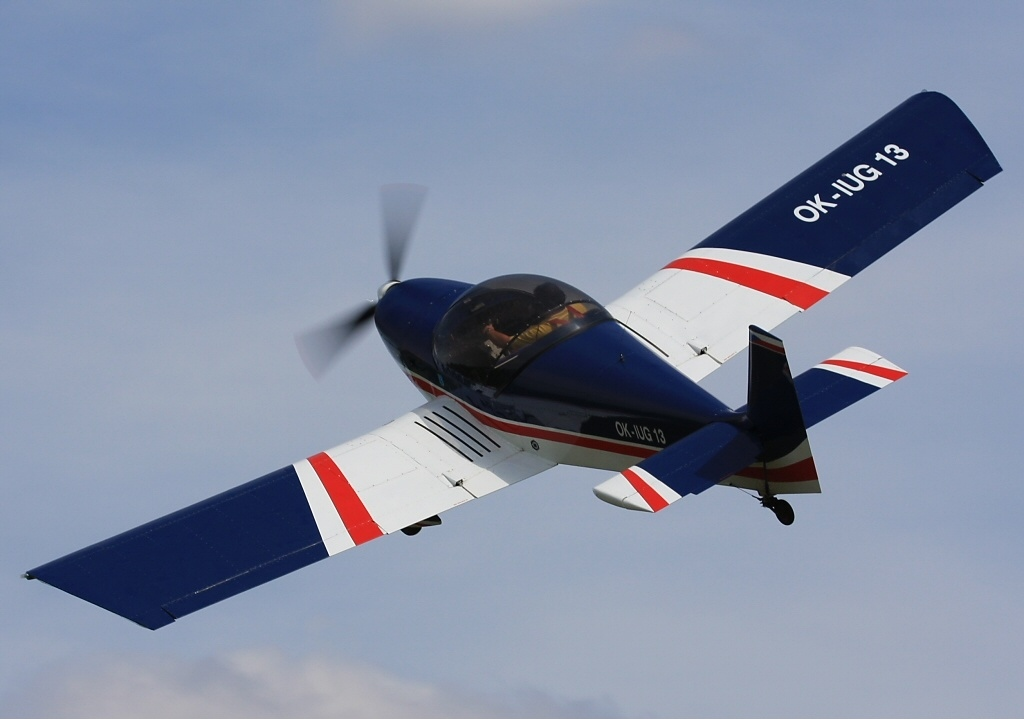
Zenair CH 601 Zodiac

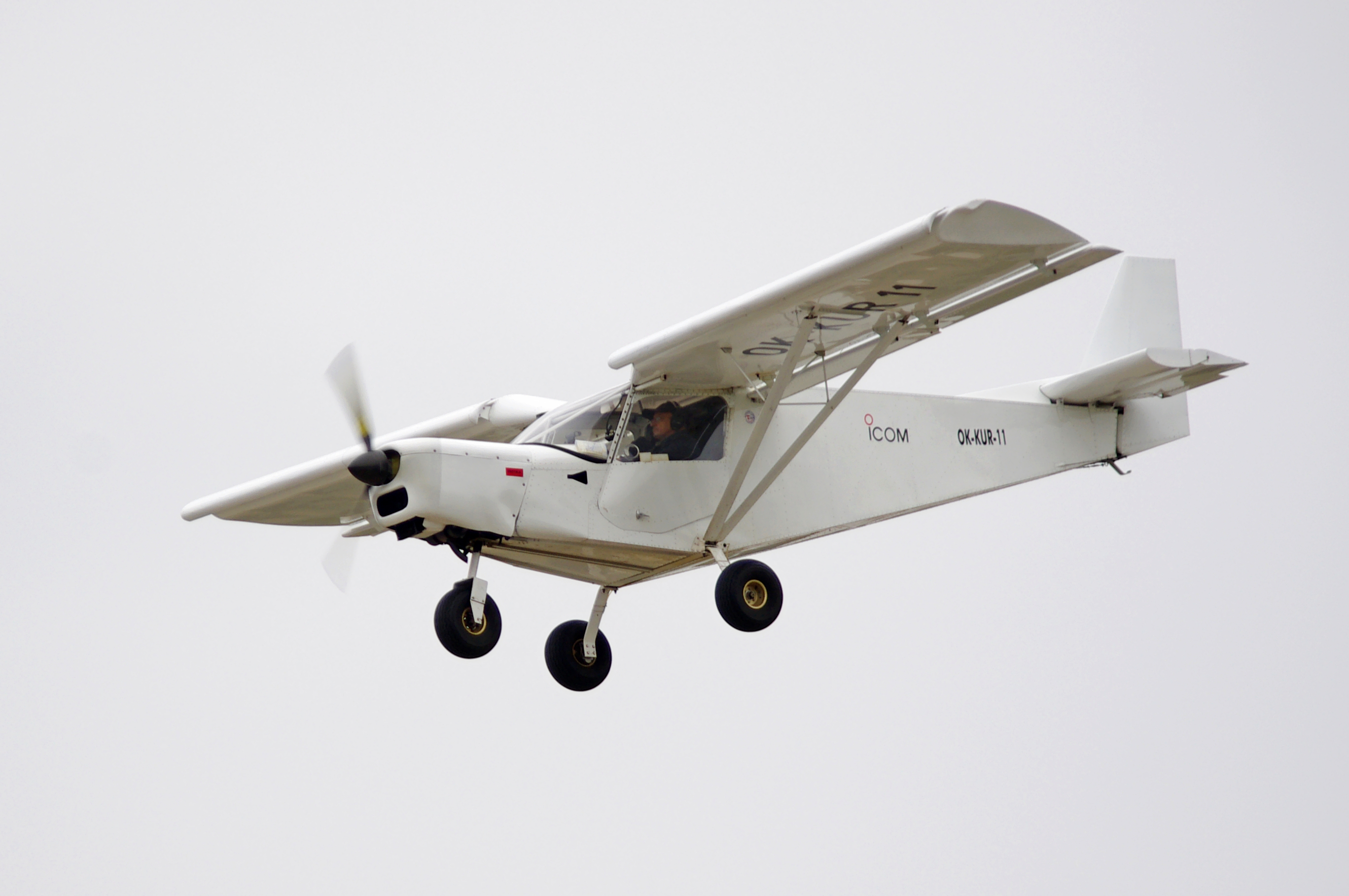
Zenair CH 701 STOL

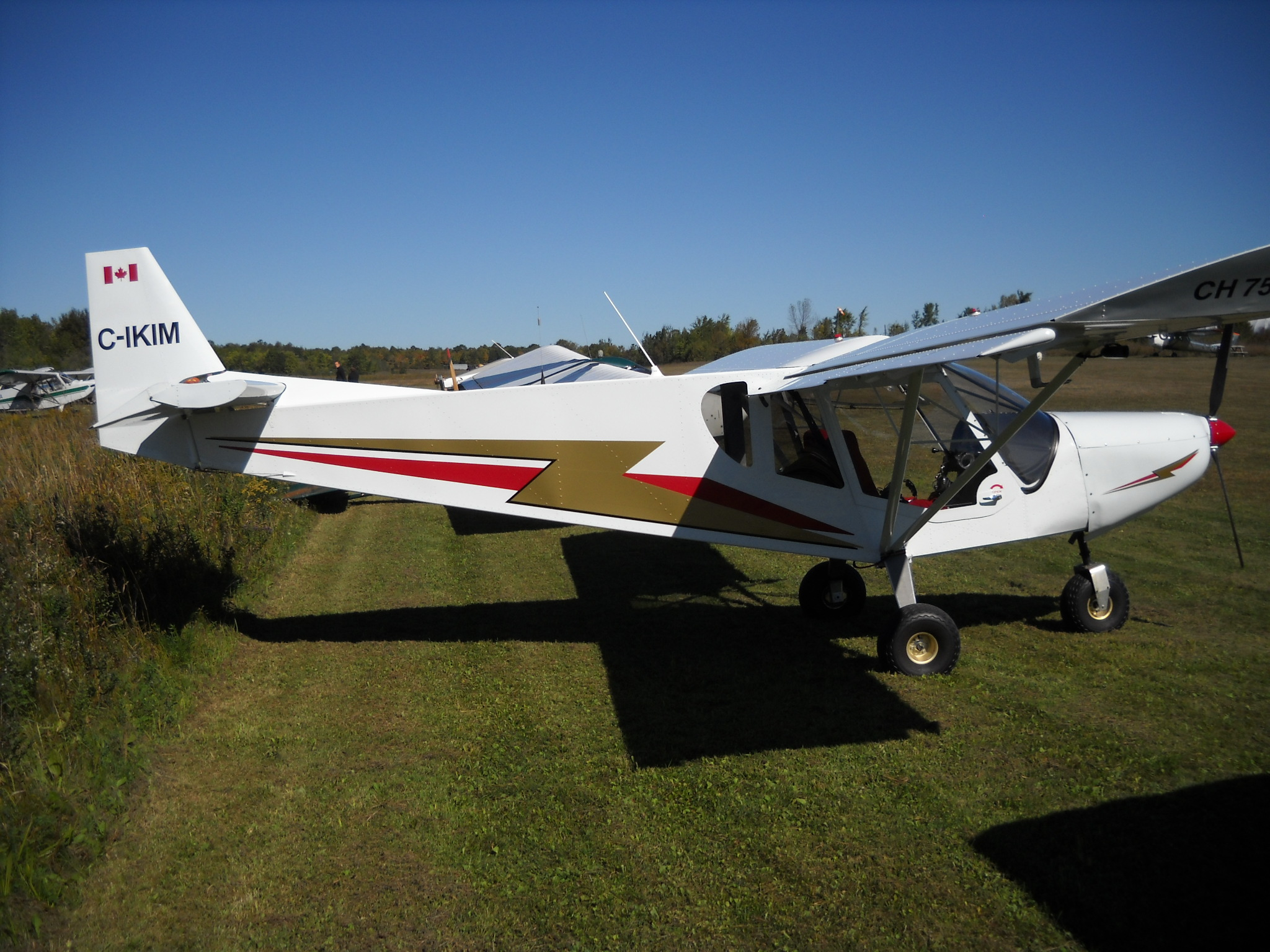
Zenair CH 750 STOL

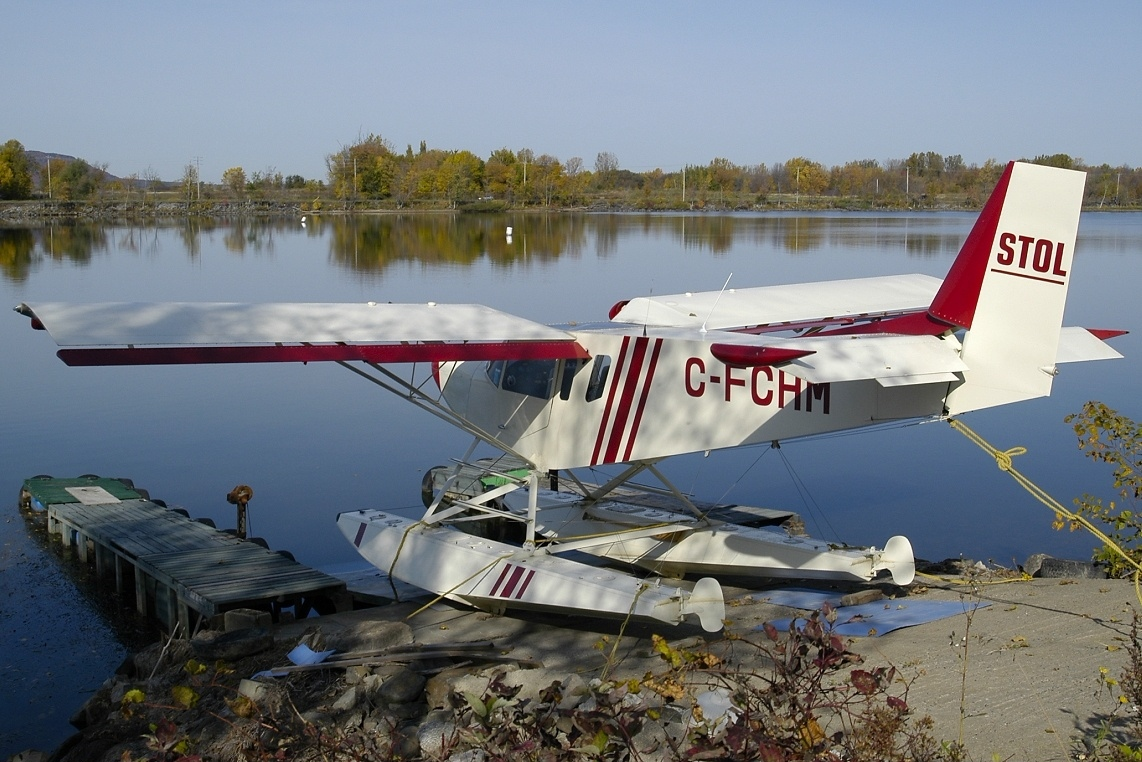
Zenair CH 801 STOL

After graduation, Heintz served in the Armée de l'Air and went on to find employment with Aerospatiale, on the Concorde supersonic airliner project. Later, he worked for Avions Pierre Robin designing several two-seat and four-seat light aircraft for type certification and production, including the Robin HR100 and Robin HR200.

It was during his time at Robin, in 1968, that Heintz started designing his own aircraft in his spare time. He named it the Zenith, an anagram of his last name. The prototype took about a year to build and had its first flight in 1969.

In 1973, Heintz, his wife Annemarie and their five children moved to Canada, as he saw greater opportunities there for flying and designing aircraft. He was hired by de Havilland Canada as a stress engineer and worked on the de Havilland Canada DHC-7 for two years. At de Havilland, he met several people who were interested in homebuilt aircraft and they formed EAA Chapter 41 there.

Heintz flew his CH200 prototype to the EAA Annual Convention and Fly-In in 1974, and due to the demand from the amateur constructors that he met there, plans and a construction manual were written so that others could build the CH200.

The following year, he formed Zenair as a home-business with partner Gerry Boudreau and started supplying aircraft kits from his two-car garage. Heintz acted as CEO and chief engineer. The company later moved to a commercial unit in Nobleton, Ontario where it was located for ten years until Boudreau's death from cancer. Heintz's home and the company were later moved to Midland, Ontario where he designed his own 15,000 sq ft (1,400 m^{2}) facility at the Midland/Huronia Airport.

After introducing a series of designs based on the CH200, he designed the Zenith STOL CH 701 and the Zenair CH 601 Zodiac. The CH701 design led to the larger two-seat Zenith STOL CH 750 and the four-seat Zenith STOL CH 801. The US-based Zenith Aircraft Company was started by his son, Sebastien Heintz in Mexico, Missouri in 1992. Zenith is licensed to produce the range of Heintz-designed kit aircraft, with a focus on the US light-sport aircraft category. The Zenith CH 2000 was type certified in 1996 and a company, Aircraft Manufacturing and Design started by Heintz in Eastman, Georgia, to produce it as the AMD Alarus. Later a kit version, the Zenair CH 640 was produced.

During a number of successive exhibitions at AirVenture in Oshkosh, Wisconsin, Heintz organized building a complete aircraft during the seven day event. Typical was the 2014 plan to assemble a Zenair CH 750, using volunteer labour from show attendees, enlisting 7,000 people to pull one rivet each to complete the project in an estimated 170 hours of building, before the aircraft flew on the last day of the show.

More than 10,000 examples of his aircraft designs have been completed and flown.

Heintz also conducted consulting engineering work and was involved with Transport Canada in the development of Canadian regulations for amateur-built aircraft and advanced ultralight aircraft. He also worked on the regulations for the US light-sport aircraft category. He was a popular public speaker, speaking at AirVenture and Sun 'n Fun among other venues, on the subjects of aircraft design, aircraft homebuilding and regulations.

== Retirement and death ==
After retiring to his native France, Heintz wrote a book about homebuilding in 2009, entitled Flying On Your Own Wings - A Complete Guide To Understanding Light Airplane Design.

After retirement, Heintz continued to work as a consulting aircraft designer and engineer.

Heintz died at home in France on 30 April 2021 at age 82. He was survived by his wife Annemarie, their five children and 12 grandchildren.

== Awards and epithets ==
Heintz was named the winner of the Experimental Aircraft Association's Dr. August Raspet Memorial Award, "for outstanding contribution to the advancement of the design of light aircraft."

Due to his work at Zenair, the company was awarded a Federation Aeronautique Internationale Honorary Group Diploma for "greatly contributing to the progress of aviation" in 1995.

Heintz was named to the EAA Hall of Fame in 1999 and given the Light Aircraft Manufacturers Association/Kitplanes magazine Presidents' Award at AirVenture on 24 July 2001.

France awarded Heintz the Aeronautic Medal for his "lifetime of achievements and contributions to aviation".

AVweb's Russ Niles described Heintz as, "one of general aviation’s most prolific aircraft designers and a pioneer of the modern homebuilt movement".

Plane & Pilot magazine described Heintz as "talented designer [who] was one of the leading figures in sport aviation for more than 40 years."

== Aircraft ==
Summary of aircraft designed:

- Zenair CH 50
- Zenair CH 100
- Zenair CH 150
- Zenair CH 180
- Zenair CH 200
- Zenair CH 250
- Zenair CH 300
- Zenair CH 400
- Zenair CH 601
- Zenith Gemini CH-620
- Zenair CH 640
- Zenair CH 650
- Zenith STOL CH 701
- Zenith STOL CH 750
- Zenith STOL CH 801
- AMD CH 2000 Alarus
- Zenair Zipper

== See also ==
- List of aerospace engineers
