= Zenair CH 300 =

Tri-Z CH 300
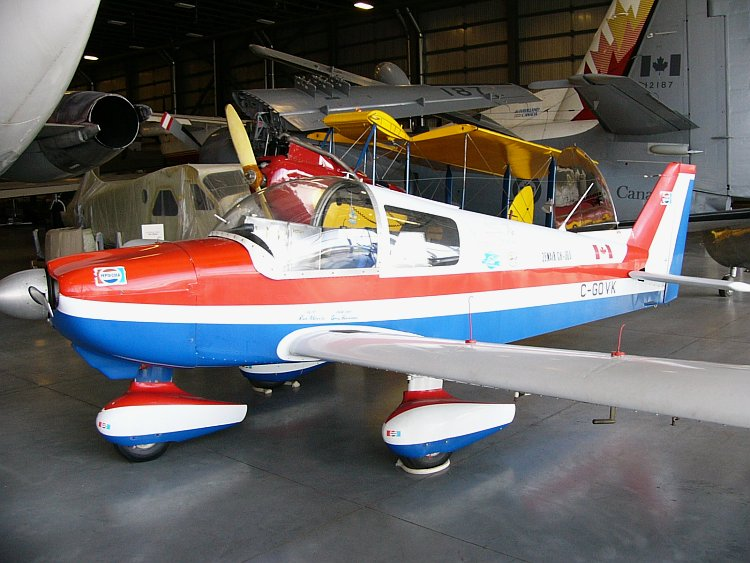
- Zenair CH 300 flown by "Red" Morris in the Canada Aviation and Space Museum

General information
- Type: Homebuilt light aircraft
- National origin: Canada
- Manufacturer: Zenair
- Designer: Chris Heintz

History
- First flight: 9 July 1977
- Variant: AMD Alarus

The Zenair Tri-Z CH 300 is a three-seat Canadian homebuilt light aircraft. A single-engined low-winged monoplane, the CH 300 first flew in 1977, with several hundred kits sold.

== Development and design ==
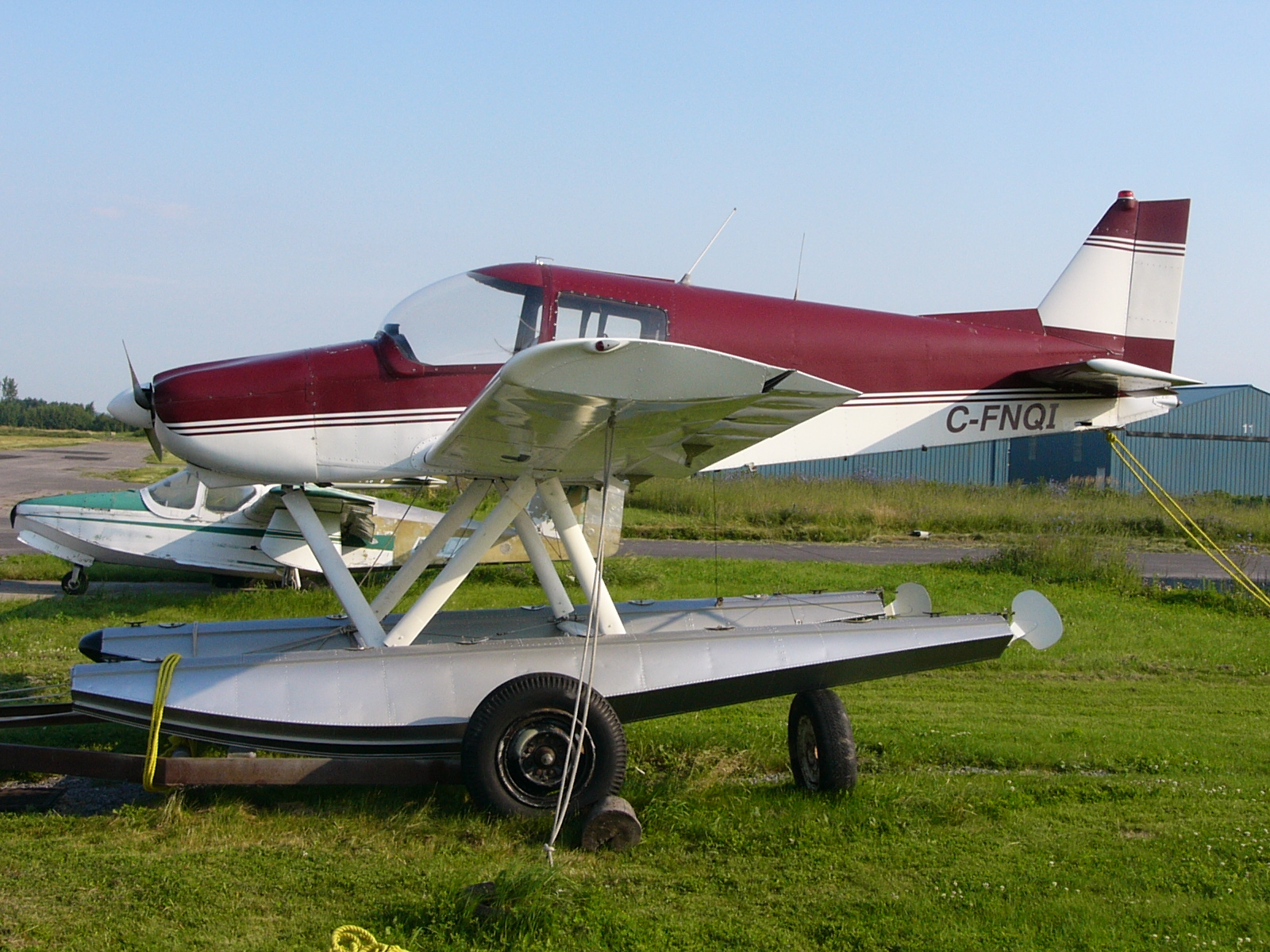
CH 300 on floats

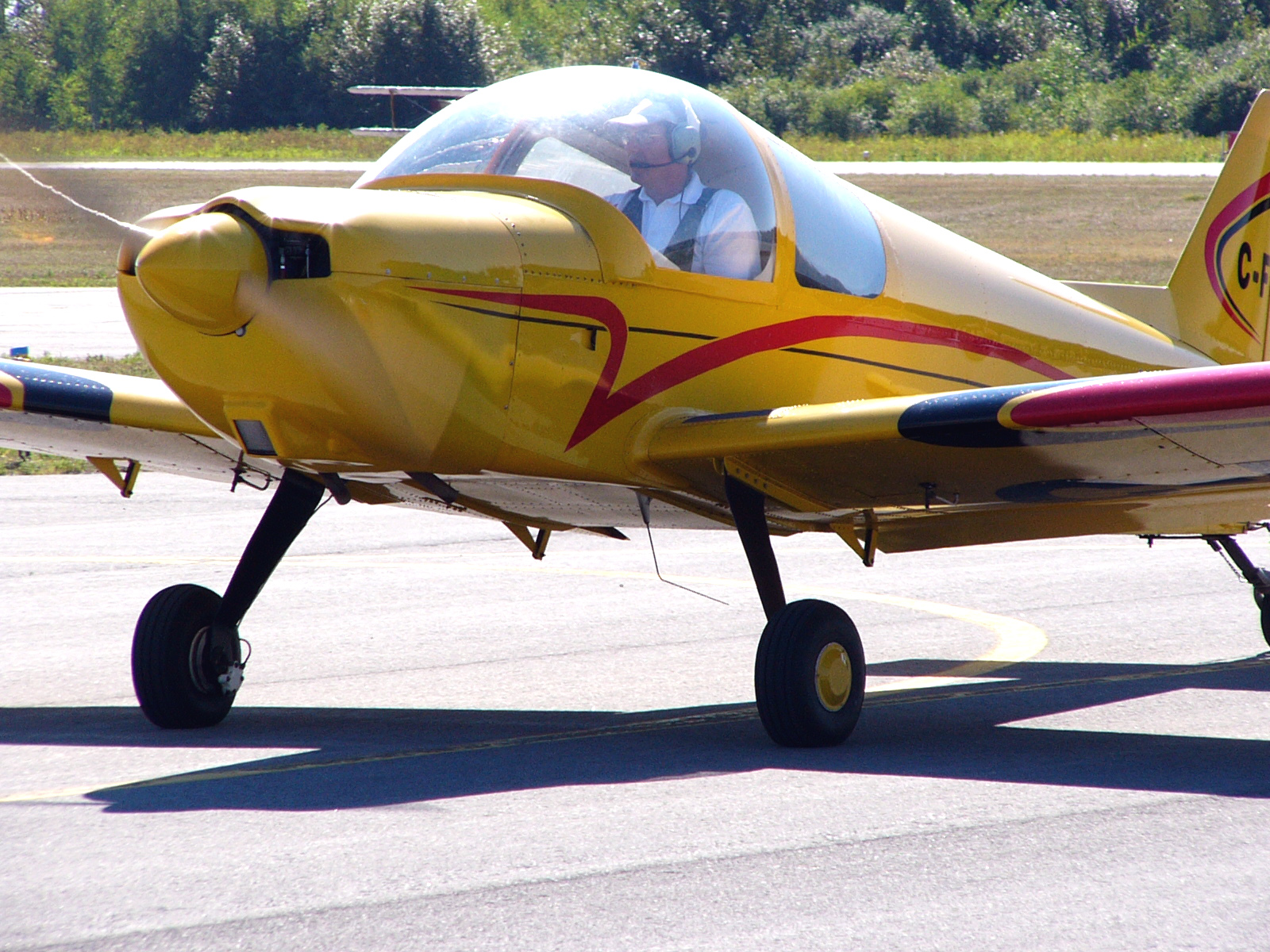
CH 300 TD "taildragger" variant

The CH 300 is an enlarged three-seat derivative of the Zenair Zenith CH 200, designed by Chris Heintz in the mid 1970s as the Tri-Zénith. Like the CH 200, it is a low-winged monoplane of all-metal construction with a fixed nosewheel undercarriage, but is larger and more powerful, and is fitted with a rear bench seat capable of accommodating a third adult or two children, and is fitted with a forward sliding canopy. It is designed to be powered by an engine giving between 125 and 180 hp (93 and 134 kW).

The first example made its maiden flight on 9 July 1977, with over 400 sets of plans sold by 1982. One CH 300, modified with extra fuel tanks and piloted by Robin "Red" Morris, made a non-stop trans-Canada flight between Vancouver International Airport and Halifax International Airport on 1–2 July 1978, covering the 2,759 mile (4,440 km) in 22 hours, 44 mins, setting three FAI Class C-1c point-to-point speed records.

Plans for the CH 300 remained on sale in 1999. The Zenair CH 300 formed the basis for the factory built Zenair CH-2000, which first flew in 1993.

== Variants ==
CH 300
Basic model with tricycle landing gear
CH 300 TD
"Taildragger" model with conventional landing gear

== Aircraft on display ==
- Canada Aviation and Space Museum

== Specifications (150 hp O-320 engine) ==
Data from Jane's All The World's Aircraft 1982-83

General characteristics

- Crew: 1
- Capacity: 2 passengers
- Length: 22 ft 6 in (6.85 m)
- Wingspan: 26 ft 7 in (8.10 m)
- Height: 6 ft 10 in (2.08 m)
- Wing area: 129.2 sq ft (12.00 m^{2})
- Aspect ratio: 5.48:1
- Empty weight: 1,100 lb (499 kg)
- Max takeoff weight: 1,850 lb (839 kg)
- Powerplant: 1 × Lycoming O-320 air-cooled flat-four, 150 hp (110 kW)

Performance

- Maximum speed: 160 mph (260 km/h, 140 kn)
- Cruise speed: 143 mph (230 km/h, 124 kn) (75% power)
- Stall speed: 53 mph (85 km/h, 46 kn) (flaps down)
- Range: 530 mi (850 km, 460 nmi)
- Rate of climb: 1,000 ft/min (5.1 m/s)

== See also ==
Related development

- AMD Alarus
- Zenair CH 200
