= Zenair CH 100 =

Mono-Z CH 100
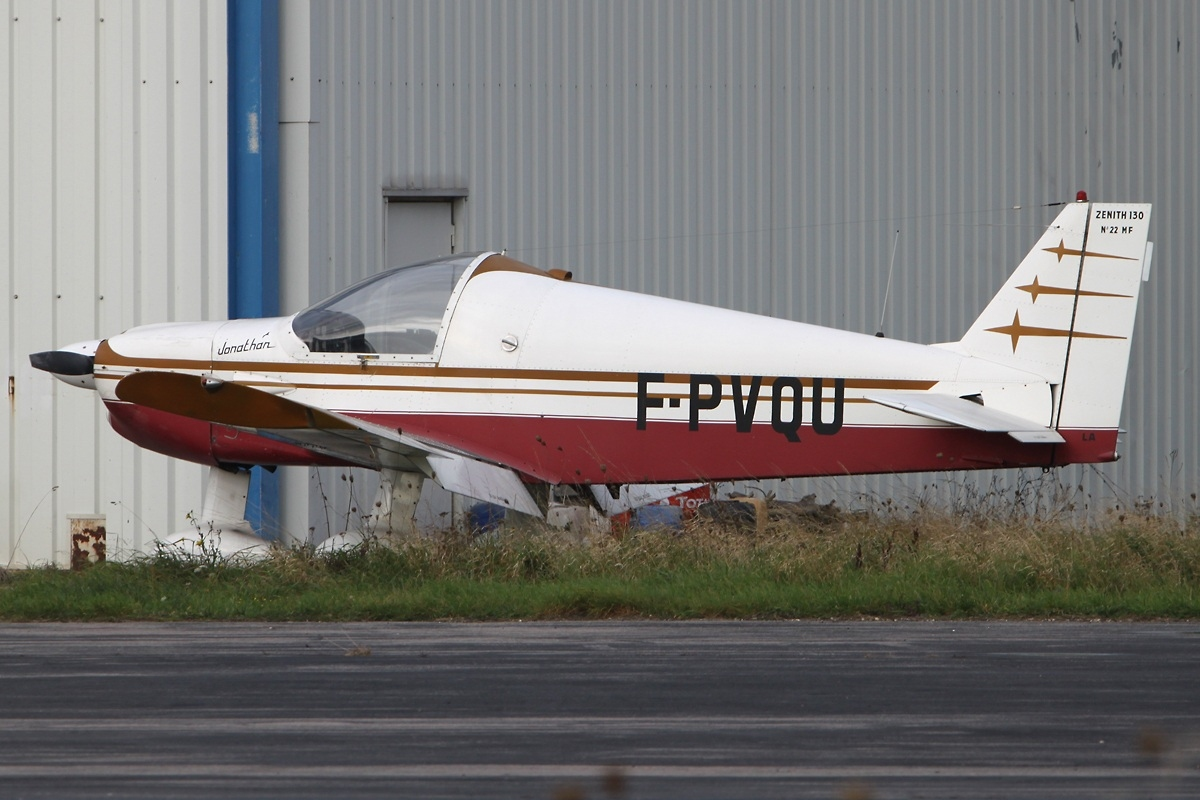

General information
- Type: Homebuilt light aircraft
- National origin: Canada
- Manufacturer: Zenair
- Designer: Chris Heintz

History
- First flight: 8 May 1975
- Developed from: Zenair CH 200

The Zenair Mono-Z CH 100 is a single-seat, single-engined Canadian light aircraft of the 1970s, that was designed by Chris Heintz. It is a smaller version of the Zenair CH 200 with a less powerful engine, which was sold as a homebuilt aircraft by Zenair.

== Development and design ==
After emigrating to Canada and setting up Zenair to sell plans and kits for amateur construction of his Zenith two-seat-light aircraft, the German aircraft designer Chris Heintz started design of a smaller, single-seat development of the Zenith, the Mono-Zenith. The Mono-Z CH 100 is similar to the Zenith that preceded it, a low-winged cantilever monoplane of all metal construction. The aircraft features a large cockpit for taller pilots, with a pilot and baggage combined weight allowance of 240 lb (109 kg) and removable wings for storage and towing the aircraft behind a car. The factory claimed a build time of 600 hours. It is designed to be powered by engines from 45 to 100 hp (33.5 to 74.5 kW).

The first CH 100 made its maiden flight on 8 May 1975, powered by a 55 hp (41 kW) Volkswagen air-cooled engine of 1600 cc, with 110 sets of plans and kits sold by 1982. Zenair continued to produce kits until 1988.

== Operational history ==
A total of three CH 100s were registered in Canada since 1987 and none are registered in 2010.

== Specifications (65 hp engine) ==
Data from Jane's All The World's Aircraft 1988-89

General characteristics

- Crew: 1
- Length: 19 ft 6 in (5.94 m)
- Wingspan: 22 ft 0 in (6.71 m)
- Height: 6 ft 6 in (1.98 m)
- Wing area: 91.5 sq ft (8.50 m^{2})
- Aspect ratio: 5.28:1
- Airfoil: GAW-1 (modified)
- Empty weight: 630 lb (286 kg)
- Max takeoff weight: 960 lb (435 kg)
- Fuel capacity: 14.4 US Gallons (55 L)
- Powerplant: 1 × Volkswagen , 65 hp (48 kW)

Performance

- Maximum speed: 125 mph (201 km/h, 109 kn)
- Cruise speed: 110 mph (180 km/h, 96 kn)
- Stall speed: 48 mph (77 km/h, 42 kn)
- Range: 400 mi (640 km, 350 nmi) with maximum fuel
- Service ceiling: 12,000 ft (3,700 m)
- Rate of climb: 820 ft/min (4.2 m/s)

== See also ==
Related development

- Zenair CH 200
- Zenair CH 150
