= AMD Zodiac =

Family of Canadian light airplanes

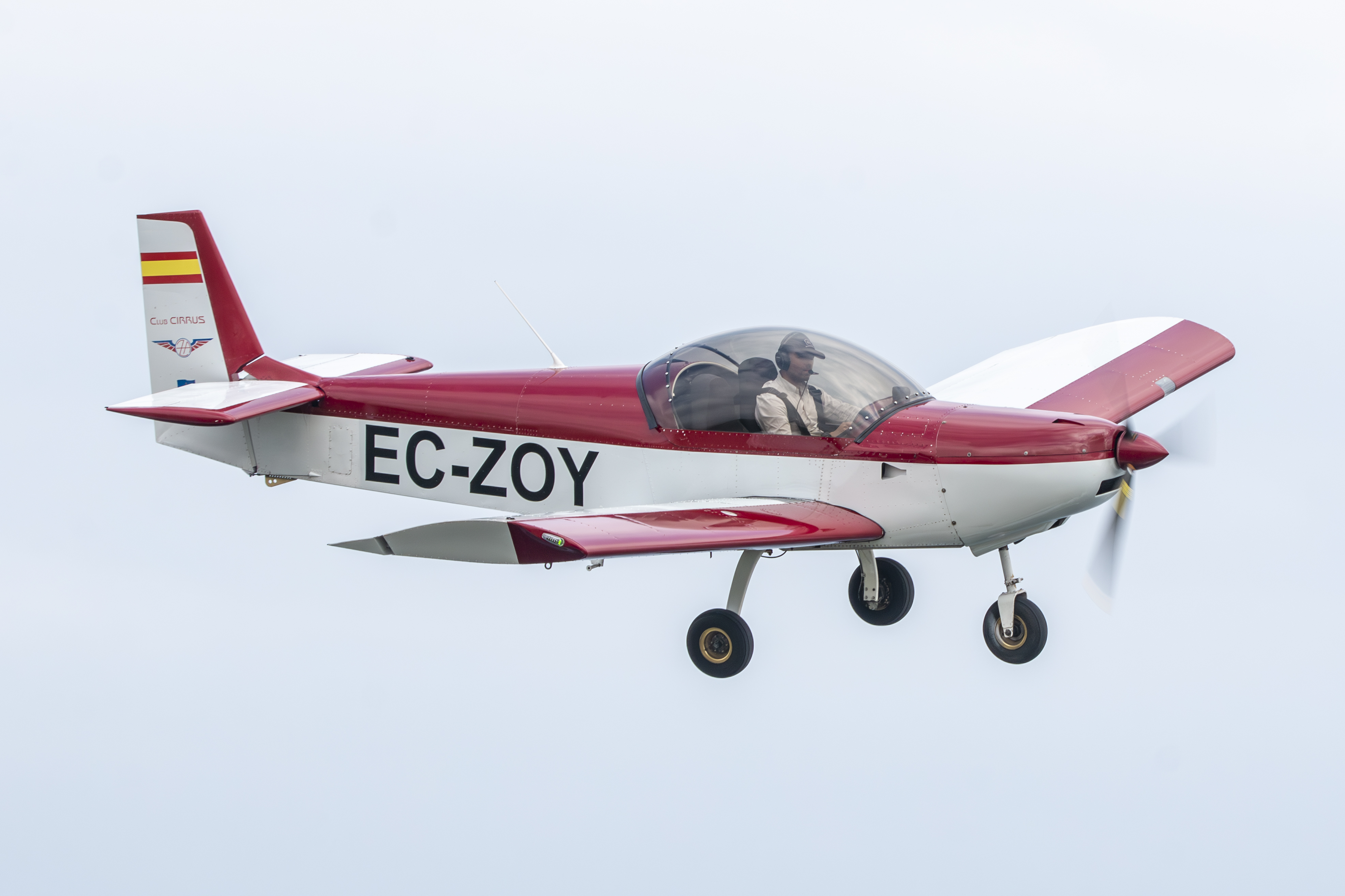
- Zenair CH 601 XL

General information
- Type: Kit aircraft
- Manufacturer: Aircraft Manufacturing and Design
- Designer: Chris Heintz
- Status: In production
- Primary users: private pilots
- Number built: More than 1,000

History
- Manufactured: Eastman, Georgia
- First flight: 1984
- Retired: N/A

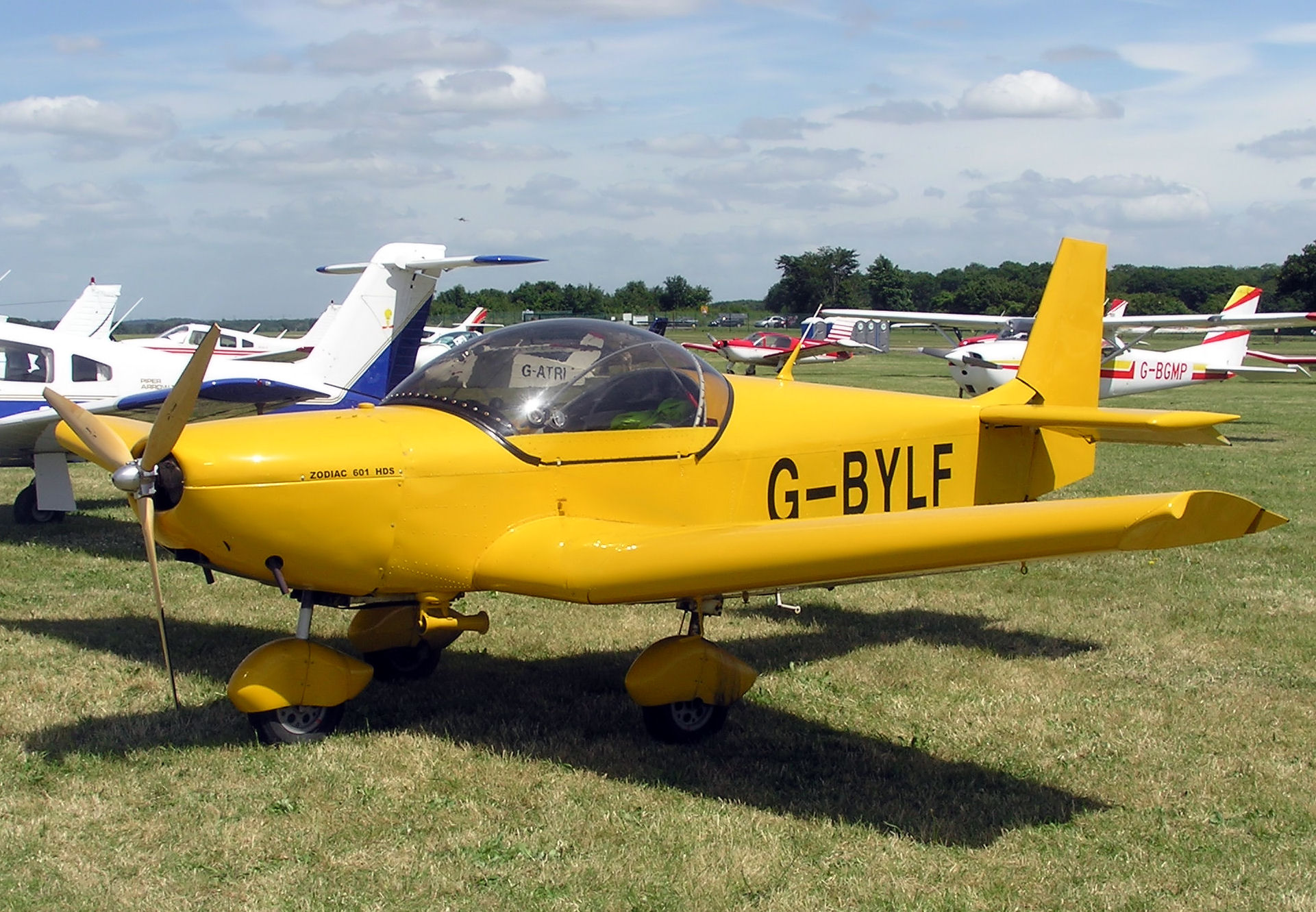
Zenair CH 601 HDS Zodiac

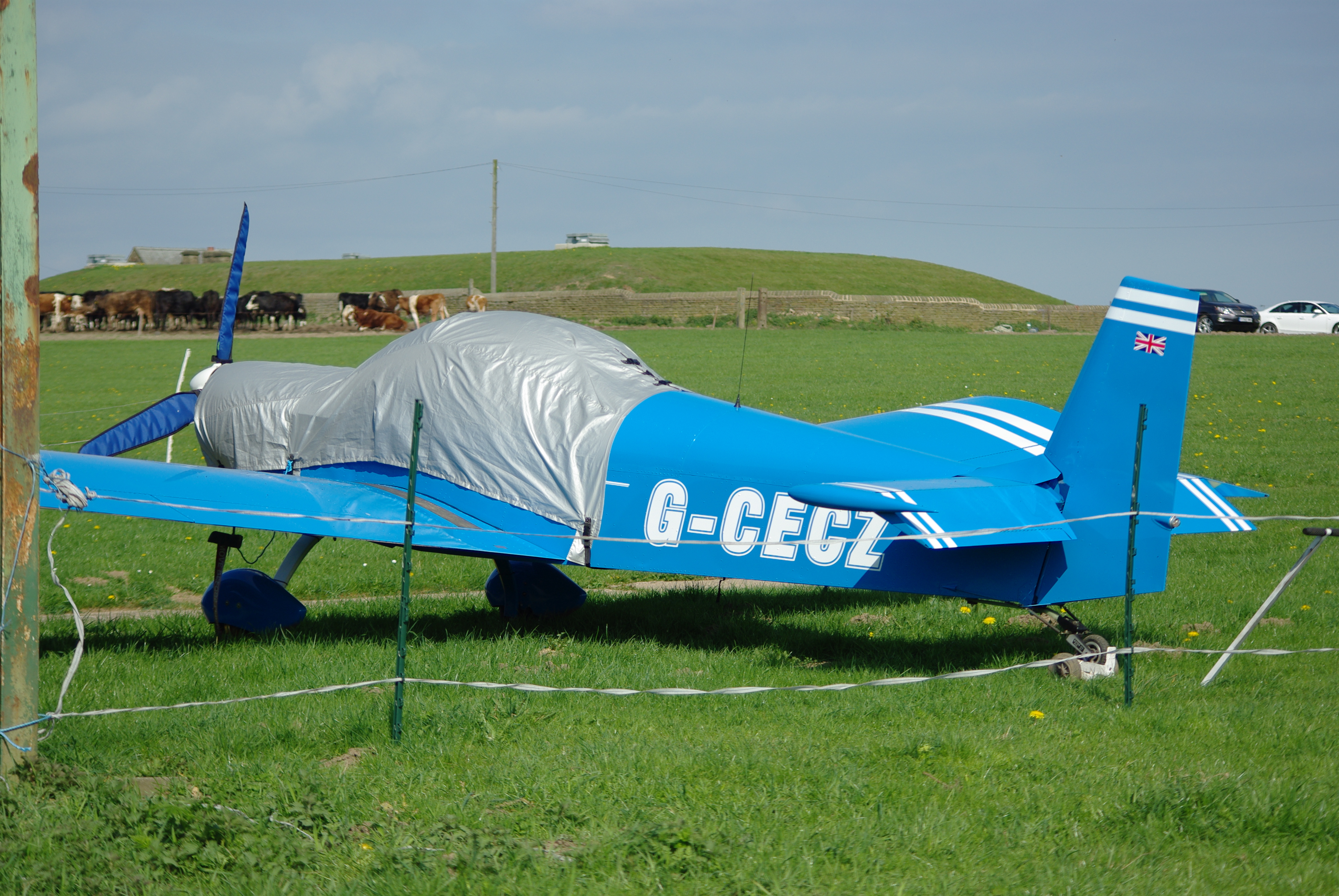
Zenair CH 601XL with tailwheel undercarriage, Rotax 912ULS engine and three blade propeller

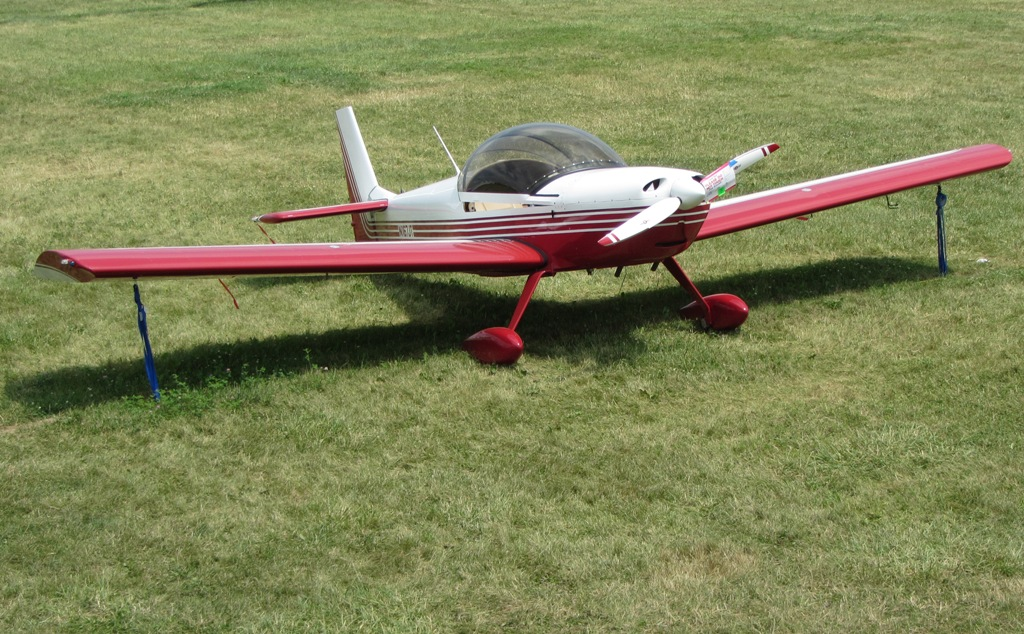
Zenair CH601XL

The Zodiac is a family of Canadian all-metal, two-seat, fixed landing gear airplanes that first flew in 1984. The aircraft have been produced as kits and completed aircraft by Zenair in Canada and Zenith Aircraft Company in the US.

The latest models in the Zodiac family are the ready-to-fly AMD Zodiac LS and LSi produced by Aircraft Manufacturing and Design. The design has a single-piece bubble canopy.

== Development ==
The Zodiac was developed by Avions Pierre Robin engineer Chris Heintz in the early 1970s. The Zenair CH 200 kit plane was developed as a Homebuilt aircraft, meaning that consumers can purchase the plane as components to assemble it themselves. Variants of the Zodiac have since been manufactured in Canada, Europe, the United States and South America as a factory-assembled, ready-to-fly aircraft.

The original Zodiac model was designed for a load factor of +/-6g at the maximum gross weight of 1200 pounds; +/- 6.9g at 1050 pounds and 8.3g at 875 pounds. The empty weight of the prototype was 590 pounds.

Heintz drafted the regulations for light-sport aircraft in Canada around the time he designed the Zodiac. He also played an important role in drafting the current light-sport aircraft (LSA) rules for the United States.

Zenith Aircraft Company still produces kits and quick-build kits for the Zodiac kit for the homebuilt-market. The company also provides engine mounts and instructions for mounting the Stratus EA 81 engine in the CH 601 series. Chevrolet Corvair engines have also been employed.

There are over 1000 Zodiac aircraft flying worldwide.

== Operational history ==
=== Safety incidents and grounding ===
==== Wing-related incidents ====
In the Netherlands, the Dutch government grounded the 12 Dutch-registered CH 601 XLs on 24 October 2008. The planes were banned from flying pending an investigation into their structural strength, following the crash of a European variant of the design (Rotax powered and 450 kg (992 lb) maximum take-off weight) that killed two people. According to the Dutch government, since 2005, "at least seven accidents with Zenith CH601 XLs have happened in which one or both wings have failed". Zenair Europe investigated these accidents, concluded that none are due to a design defect and, after a first-hand review of the wreckage, also rejected suggestions that the aircraft in the Dutch accident experienced a structural failure.

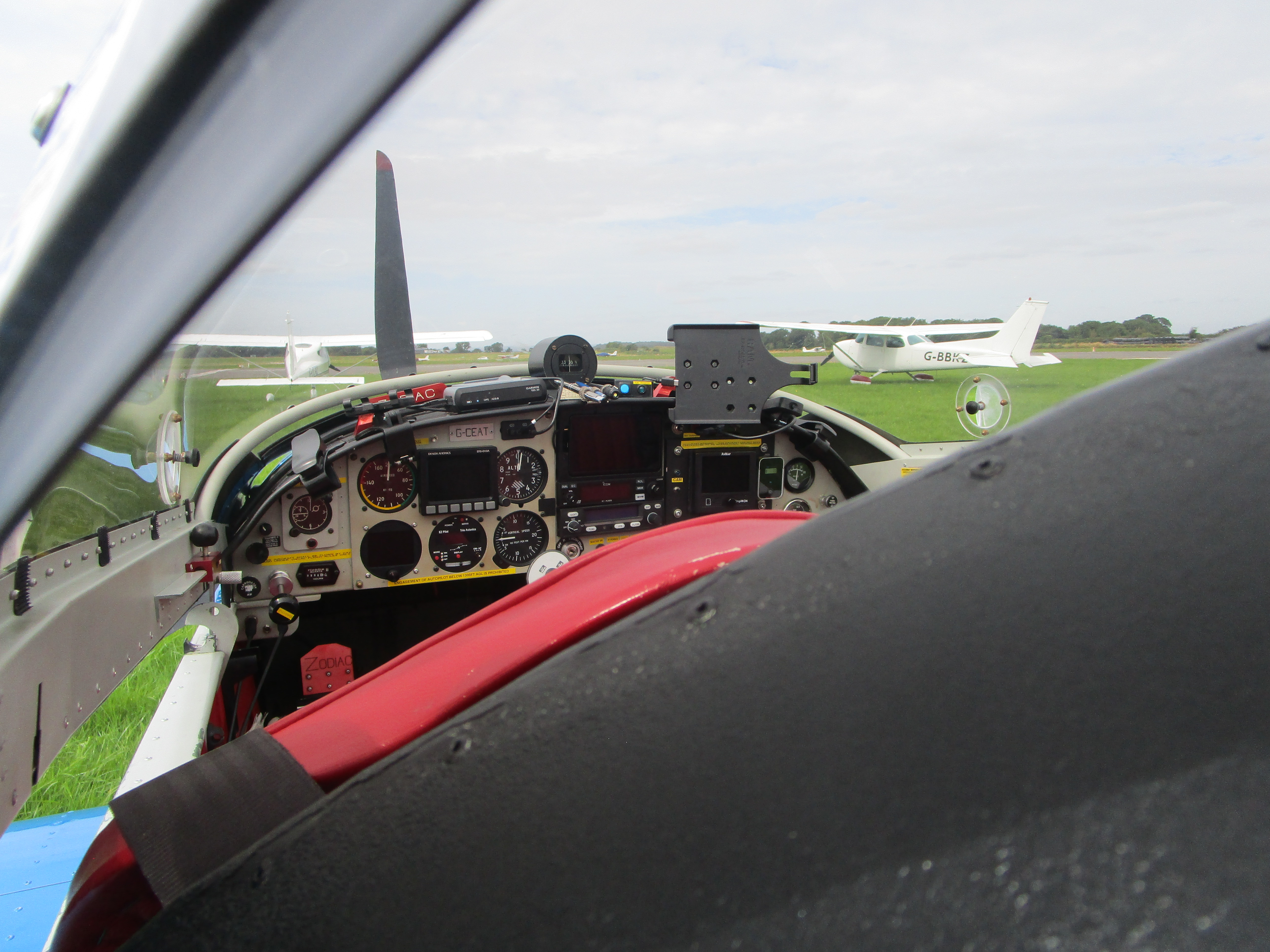
G-CEAT - Zenair CH601 cockpit

On 14 April 2009, the NTSB wrote an urgent letter to the FAA recommending that they ground all Zodiac CH 601 XLs, saying, "It appears that aerodynamic flutter is the likely source of four of the U.S. accidents and of at least two foreign accidents". The NTSB also wrote to ASTM International, the body responsible for developing standards for light sport aircraft, recommending that those standards be changed in light of the investigation. The NTSB said that the type had been involved "in six in-flight structural breakups since 2006".

Zenith Aircraft disputed the NTSB's conclusions and stated in a response on their website that "[w]e continue to believe wing flutter will not occur if the control cables are adjusted properly." They also cited Zenair Europe's disagreement with the Dutch government's conclusion that that accident was caused by flutter. AMD issued a safety alert in October 2008 mandating inspections of aileron control cable tensions. The company hired an independent consultant, Dr. Uwe Weltin, an internationally recognized flutter and vibrations specialist and head of the Institut für Zuverlaessigkeitstechnik at the Technical University of Hamburg-Harburg who concluded that when the CH 601 XL is built and maintained to Zenair specifications, there is "no tendency to flutter or divergence found within the flight envelope of the CH 601 XL". The company claimed that the report clears the Zodiac design of flutter-related concerns as long as CH 601 XL is built and maintained to Zenair specifications.

In reacting to the NTSB recommendations, the FAA Administrator Randy Babbit declined to ground the aircraft, and in a 13 July 2009 letter, stated, "Data indicates the CH-601XL has a safety record similar to other S-LSA and appears capable of safe flight and operations if maintained according to the manufacturer's recommendations."

On 6 November 2009, an amateur-built CH-601XL broke up in flight over Arkansas, resulting in the death of the pilot. Preliminary investigation of the accident revealed a failure mode similar to that seen in the earlier crashes, as both wings separated in flight. This brought the number of crashes to seven and deaths to 11.

The FAA issued a Special Airworthiness Information Bulletin on 7 November 2009 and strongly recommended that the aircraft not be flown until modifications detailed in an AMD Safety Alert are carried out. AMD and Zenith Aircraft issued documents the same day, mandating that the S-LSA version not be flown until the modifications were completed and recommended all aircraft be modified. The modifications included strengthening of the main and rear wing spar carrythroughs and the addition of aileron balance weights. The Experimental Aircraft Association also recommended grounding all affected aircraft until modifications are complete.

In a statement issued by Zenith Aircraft, the designer, Chris Heintz, in response to the question "Why are you recommending this Upgrade Package? What has prompted this "180-degree" shift, from insisting that the CH 601 XL design was fine "as is", to now mandating a list of upgrades requiring more than a dozen modifications?" stated:

The past two years have been challenging for the CH 601 XL community around the world. As we all know, a number of accidents have occurred over the span of a few years for which no common cause has been determined. This lack of a "smoking gun" has caused all kinds of conjectures and wild guesses as to probable cause, and each time a new "theory" or "solution" is proposed, I and numerous engineers spend long hours trying to validate or rebuke the latest round of speculation. To this date, after thousands of man-hours of investigations, multiple design reviews and an unheard-of amount of testing, the accidents in question still do not share a common cause. In offering this "Upgrade Package" I have had to set aside my own professional opinion (that the design is sound) as well as legal counsel's advice in order to provide builders, owners and pilots the "fix" that they have been asking me for. With these upgrades (my "180° shift"), the safety margins of key airframe components have been dramatically increased...

On 12 November 2009, the FAA ceased issuing new Certificates of Airworthiness, requiring new registrants to prove that they have complied with the modifications before being permitted to fly the aircraft.

In addressing to the 6 November 2009 accident, NTSB Chairman Deborah A.P. Hersman said on 13 November 2009:

We are pleased that the FAA and the manufacturer have acted on the safety-of-flight issues that we identified with the Zodiac special light sport airplane. We are troubled, however, that no modifications are required on the amateur-built planes. We are very concerned that a lack of required compliance may lead to more accidents like the one in Arkansas, and others we've already seen.

The FAA completed an in-depth review of the CH601 XL and 650 and issued a report entitled Zodiac CH601 XL Airplane Special Review Team Report January 2010. The FAA concluded:

FAA review of the in-flight failures did not indicate a single root cause, but instead implicated the potential combination of several design and operation aspects. Our preliminary assessments focused on the strength and stability of the wing structure. Further analysis during the special review found the loads the manufacturer used to design the structure do not meet the design standards for a 1,320 lb (600kg) airplane. Static load test data verifies our conclusion. The special review also identified issues with the airplane's flutter characteristics, stick force gradients, airspeed calibration, and operating limitations.

In reacting to the FAA's report, the Experimental Aircraft Association's Vice President of Industry and Regulatory Affairs, Earl Lawrence, said, "The FAA did an excellent job with this investigation and deserves credit for thoroughly exploring all possibilities. EAA had vigorously pushed for comprehensive data on these accidents. We wanted to see the data, so aircraft owners knew exactly what modifications were needed and why they were needed immediately."

On 20 April 2019, another wing failure accident in Bulgaria killed the pilot and passenger.

== Variants ==
Zenair CH 600
The original version of the Zodiac, the CH 600, was designed by Chris Heintz and first flown in 1984. The aircraft was intended as a primary trainer. The original prototype was powered by a Volkswagen 1875cc engine converted for aircraft use that produced 65 hp at 3400 rpm.
Zenair CH 601 HD
The CH 601 HD (for heavy duty) was the follow-on to the original CH 600 and incorporated many improvements to the design. The HD version had a gross weight of 1200 lbs and a standard empty weight of 530 lbs. Aircraft kits were marketed by Zenair of Midland, Ontario in Canada and by Zenith Aircraft of Mexico, Missouri.
Zenair CH 601 HDS
The CH 601 HDS (for heavy duty speedwing) was a version of the HD with the wing span reduced to 23 feet (7.0 m) and a wing area of just 98 square feet (9.1 m^{2}). The wing also featured a tapered design with a 34 inch chord at the wing tip.
Zenair CH 601 UL
The UL version of the CH 601 was specially designed for the Canadian Advanced Ultralight Aeroplane category that was introduced in 1991. Heintz was instrumental in the creation of the category as the author of the standards and used the CH 601 as a model for the category. The UL version had a reduced gross weight of 1058 lbs, the maximum allowed in the category. When the gross weight for the AULA category was increased to 1200 lbs in 2001 the CH 601 UL had its gross weight increased to the 1200 lb mark also. The UL version was supplied in 51% or 85% kit or completed form by Zenair in Canada and was designed for engines of 80–100 horsepower (60–75 kW). The aircraft did not neatly fit any US categories and US buyers were advised to consider the HD instead.
Zenith CH 601 XL
The CH 601 XL was first flown in 1991 as an improved version of the HD developed for the amateur-built market and also for the American Light Sport Aircraft category. The XL features many incremental improvements over the HD, including a new wing design, wing fuel tanks to replace the fuselage tanks of the HD, new landing gear design and a new canopy.

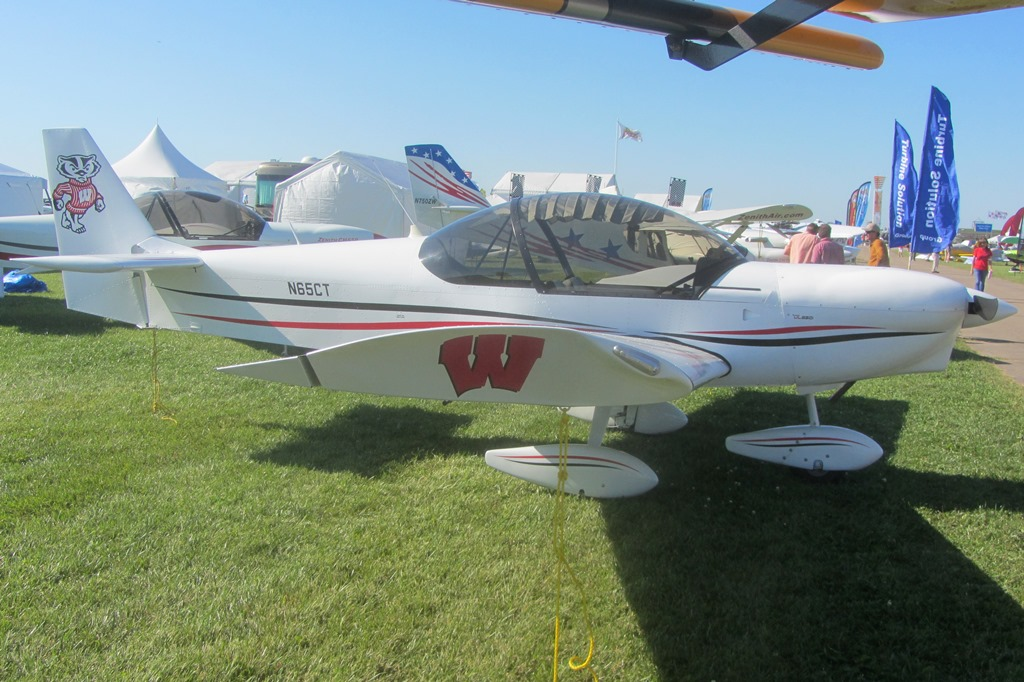
CH 650 with UL Power engine

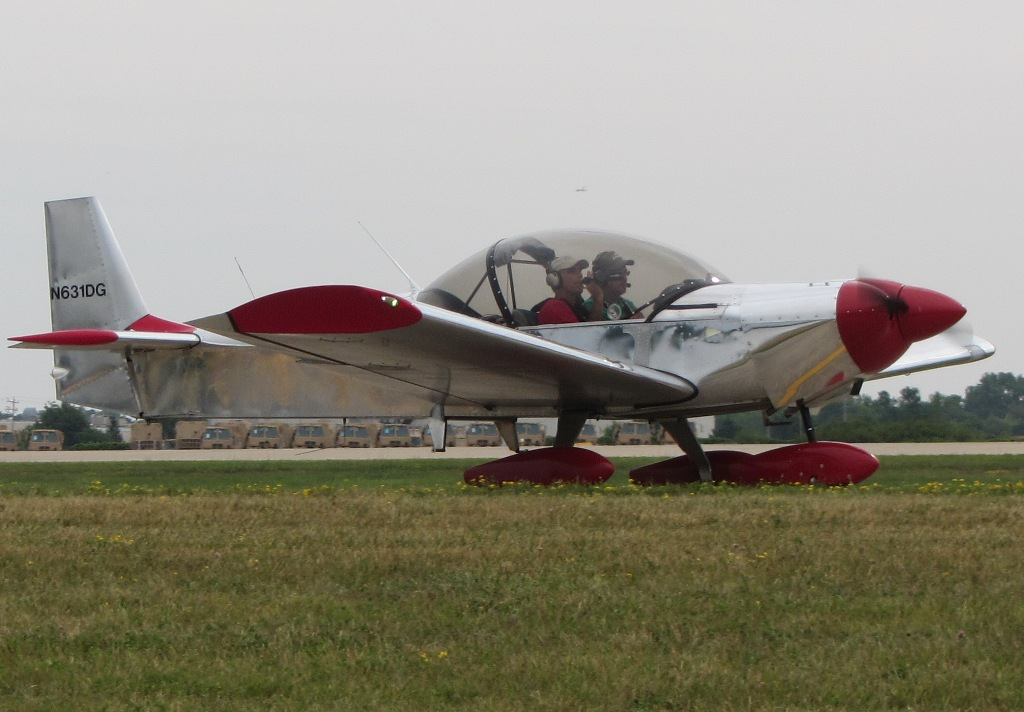
Zenith CH650 with a Corvair engine

Zenith CH 650
Modernized version of the 601, with a larger cockpit, a larger canopy with more headroom, swept-back fin and rudder and engine options that include the 120 hp (89 kW) Jabiru 3300, 100 hp (75 kW) Continental O-200 and 100 hp (75 kW) Rotax 912ULS. One hundred had been completed and flown by December 2011.
Zenith CH 650E
Version for the US light-sport aircraft category.
Zenith CH 650Ei
Version for the European microlight category, with a gross weight of 472.5 kg (1,042 lb) and a Rotax 912ULS engine of 100 hp (75 kW). Manufactured as a ready-to-fly aircraft by ICP srl in Italy.
AMD Zodiac XL & XLi
The completed US Light Sport Aircraft compliant version of the XL is the AMD Zodiac produced by Aircraft Manufacturing and Design of Eastman, Georgia, USA. The aircraft is available in two versions, the XL, and the XLi. The XLi is IFR equipped for night flying and instrument flight conditions, while the XL is only equipped for VFR day and night flying.
AMD Zodiac LS and LSi
Zodiac CH 650 in VFR and IFR versions. Standard engine is the 100 hp (75 kW) Continental O-200

== Specifications (AMD Zodiac XL) ==
Data from AMD website

General characteristics

- Crew: 1 pilot
- Capacity: 1 passenger and 550 lb (250 kg) useful load
- Length: 20 ft 0 in (6.1 m)
- Wingspan: 27 ft 0 in (8.23 m)
- Height: 6 ft 6 in (1.98 m)
- Wing area: 132 sq ft (12.5 m^{2})
- Airfoil: NACA 65-018
- Empty weight: 770 lb (350 kg)
- Max takeoff weight: 1,320 lb (600 kg)
- Powerplant: × Continental O-200 , 100 hp (75 kW)

Performance

- Maximum speed: 140 kn (161 mph, 257 km/h)
- Cruise speed: 111 kn (130 mph, 211 km/h)
- Stall speed: 37 kn (44 mph, 71 km/h)
- Never exceed speed: 140 kn (161 mph, 257 km/h)
- Range: 608 nmi (715 mi, 1,158 km)
- Service ceiling: 12,000 ft (3,700 m)
- Rate of climb: 1,000 ft/min (5.1 m/s)
- Wing loading: 10 lb/sq ft (48 kg/m^{2})
- Power/mass: 13.2 lb/hp (0.125 W/kg)

Avionics

- Garmin
