= Zenair =

Canadian homebuilt aircraft manufacturer

Coordinates: 44°41′28″N 79°55′58.75″W

- Type: Private company
- Industry: Aerospace
- Founded: 1974
- Founder: Chris Heintz
- Headquarters: Midland, Ontario, Canada
- Products: Kit aircraft
- Website: www.zenair.com

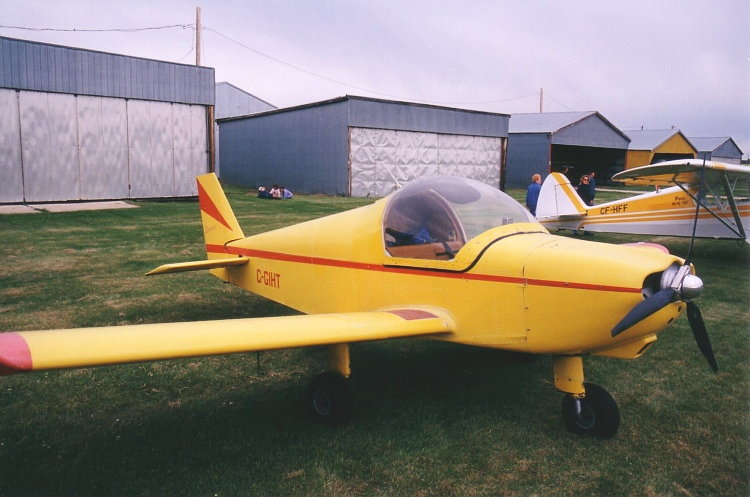
A Zenair CH 200, the first Chris Heintz design marketed

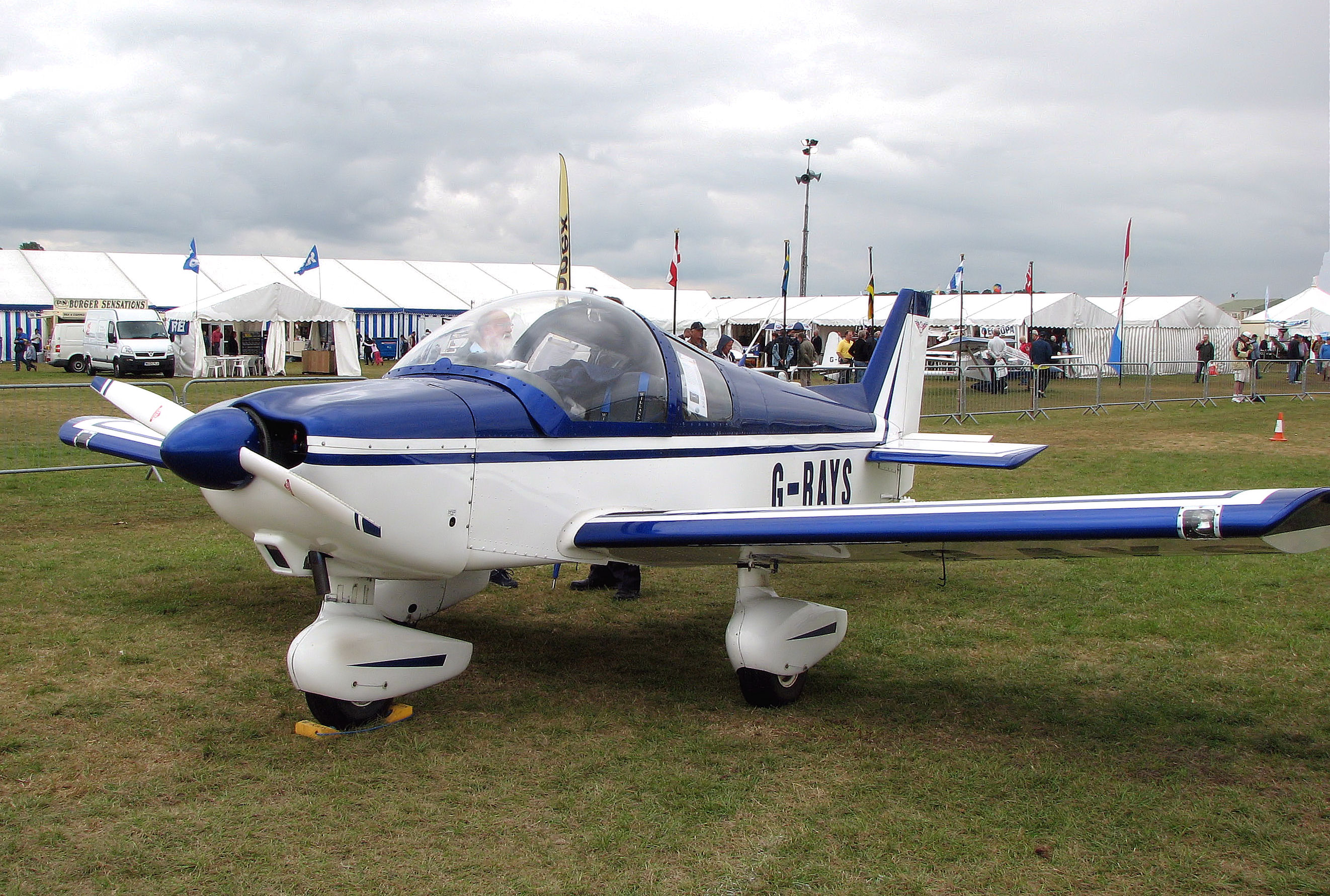
Zenair CH 250 Zenith

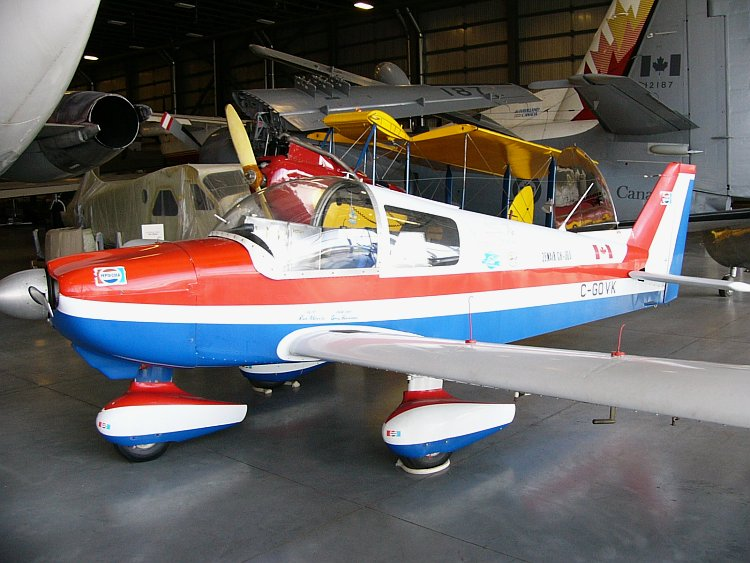
Zenair CH 300 Tri Zenith C-GOVK used by Red Morris to make a record-setting non-stop flight across Canada in 1978. The aircraft is in the Canada Aviation and Space Museum.

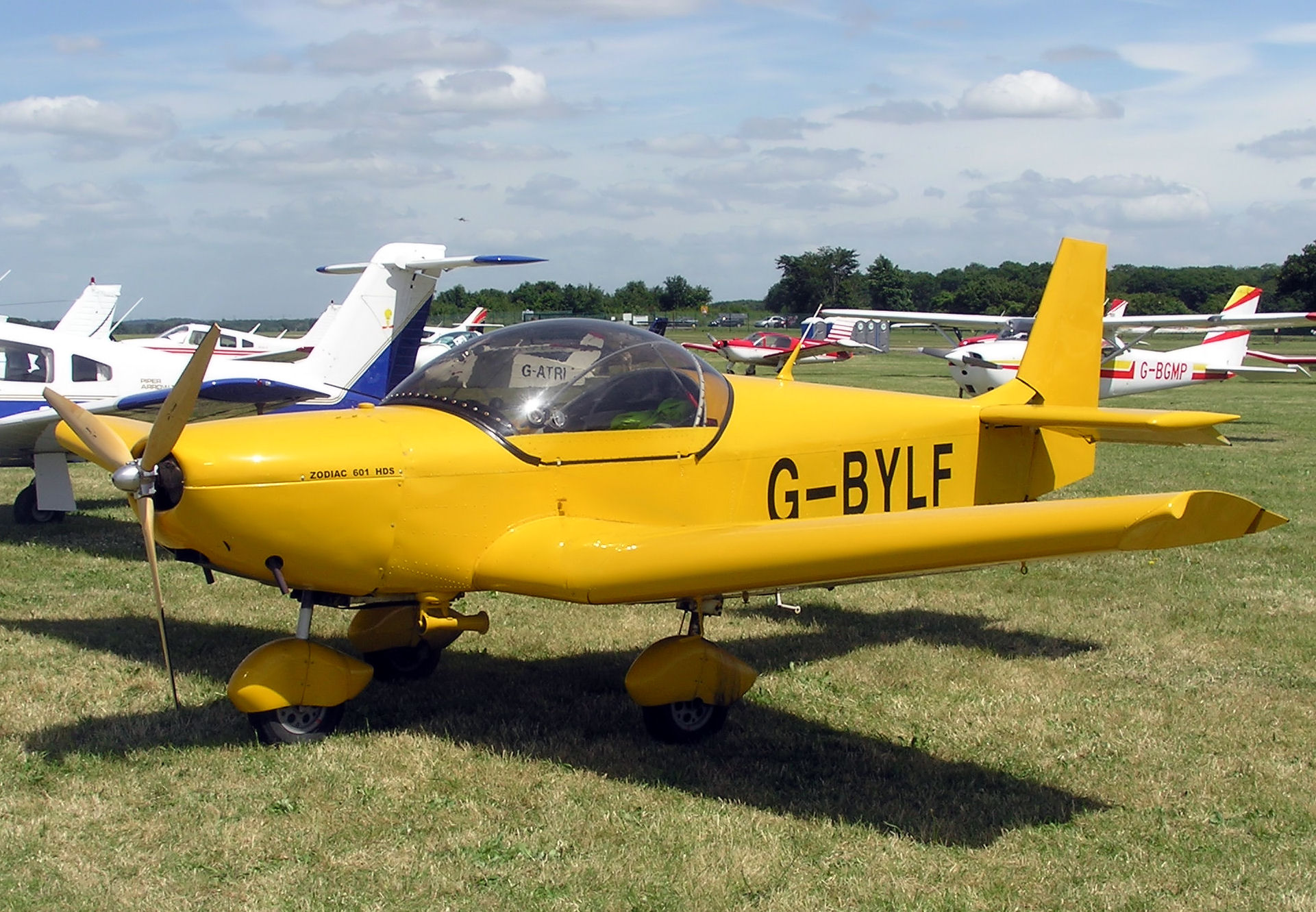
Zenair CH 601 HDS Zodiac

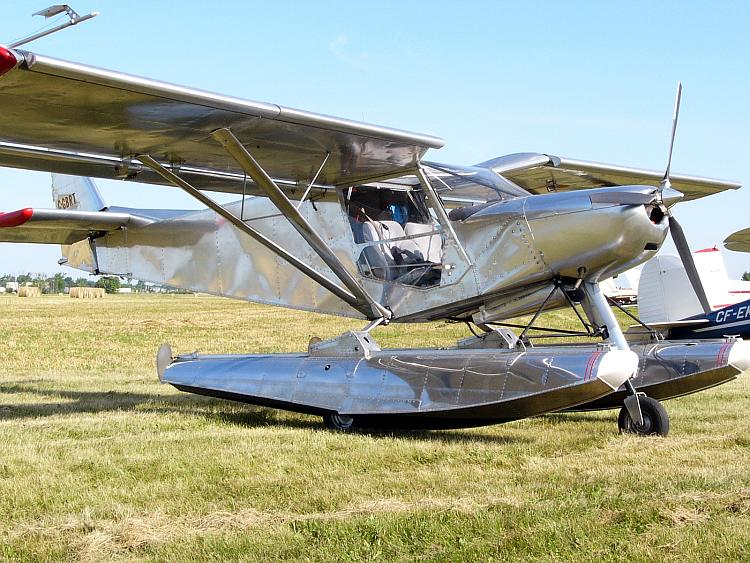
Zenair CH 701 STOL

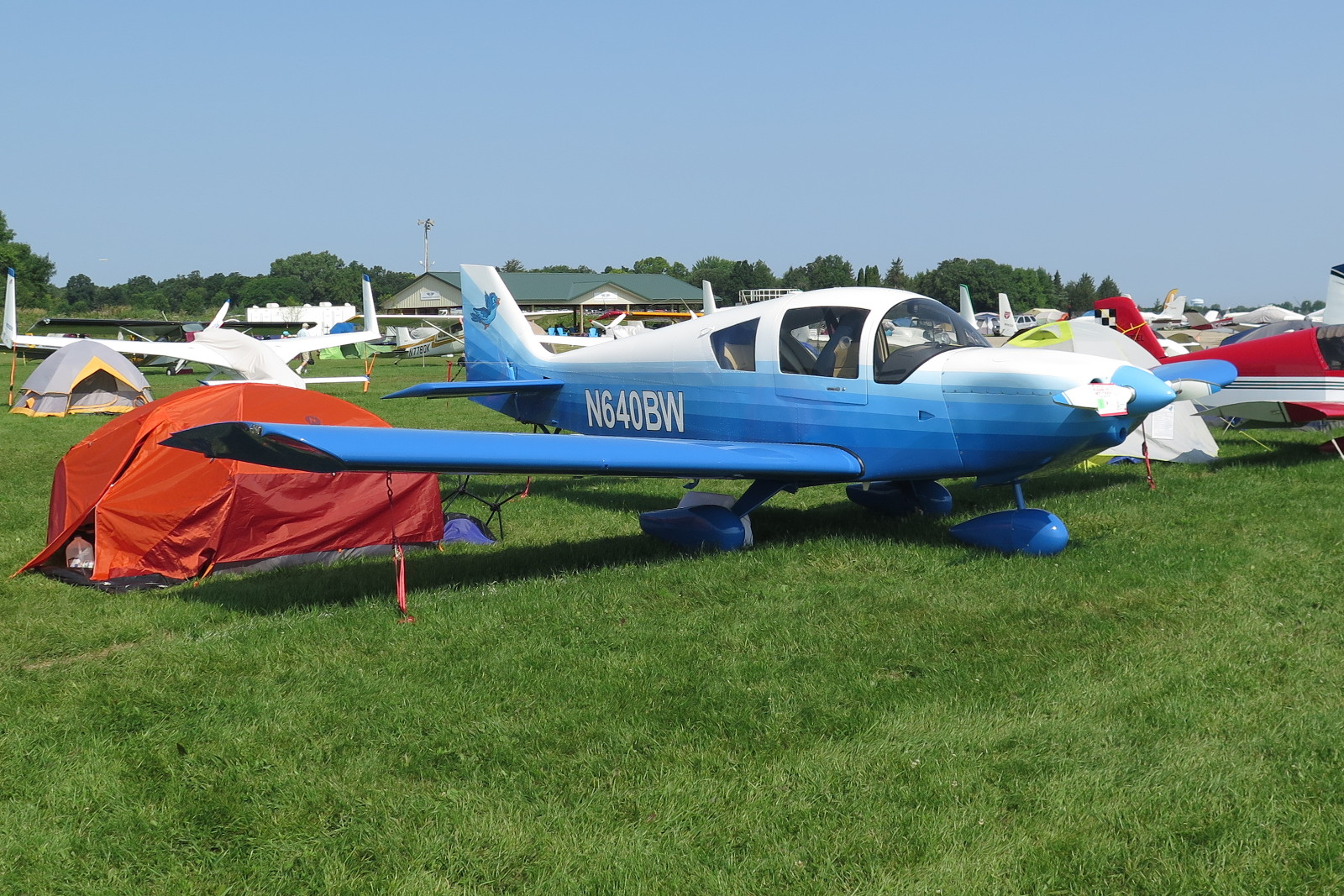
Zenith CH-640

Zenair Ltd is a Canadian kit aircraft producer founded by aeronautical engineer Chris Heintz and based in Midland, Ontario.

== History ==
The company was founded in 1974 when Heintz started to manufacture Zenith kits from his two-car garage. Heintz has introduced more than twelve kit aircraft designs. In 1992, Heintz licensed the kit manufacturing and marketing rights to Zenith Aircraft Company for the STOL CH 701 and the ZODIAC CH 601 designs, and has developed the new STOL CH 801 and the new ZODIAC XL for Zenith Aircraft Company.

In 1996, Chris Heintz and Zenair Ltd. obtained FAA type-certification for the Zenith CH 2000, a two-seat low-wing aircraft based on his kit aircraft designs. Aircraft Manufacturing and Design (AMD) manufactures this aircraft as the AMD Alarus CH 2000. AMD also produces the CH 601 XL as a Light-sport aircraft (LSA).

In October 2012, four French universities selected the Zodiac CH 650B as their instructional aircraft. In France, where the CH 650 is semi-certified in the CNSK category, the kit aircraft can be assembled by amateurs and still be used by Aeroclubs and schools for flight training and banner-towing purposes.

Zenair Limited on November 15, 2012 announced that its FAA type-certificated CH 2000 trainer will be assembled in Peru, South America by a joint venture involving the Peruvian armed services, the University of Perunas and SEMAN, a local aeronautical facility. Negotiations to structure the long-term program have been ongoing for the past year, with Zenair staff traveling to Lima and a contingent of Peruvian decision-makers visiting the Ontario-based factory.

Company founder Chris Heintz died on 30 April 2021, at his home in France at age 82.

== Aircraft ==
- Zenair Cricket - Kit
- Zenair Zipper
- Zenair Zipper II
- Zenair CH 50 Mini Z
- Zenair CH 100 Mono-Z
- Zenair CH 150 Acro-Z
- Zenair CH 180 Super Acro-Z
- Zenair CH 200
- Zenair CH 250
- Zenair CH 300
- Zenair CH 300 Tri-Z
- Zenith CH 400
- Zenith CH 600
- Zenith CH 601
- Zenith CH 620 Gemini
- Zenair CH 640
- Zenair CH 650
- Zenith STOL CH 701
- Zenith STOL CH 750
- Zenith STOL CH 801
- Zenith CH 2000 Alarus
- Zenair CH 8000AG, made in Kazakhstan by AviaMaster Aircraft Ltd.
- Zenith Aluminum Floats - started 1978
