= Zenair CH 200 =

Zenith CH 200 & 250
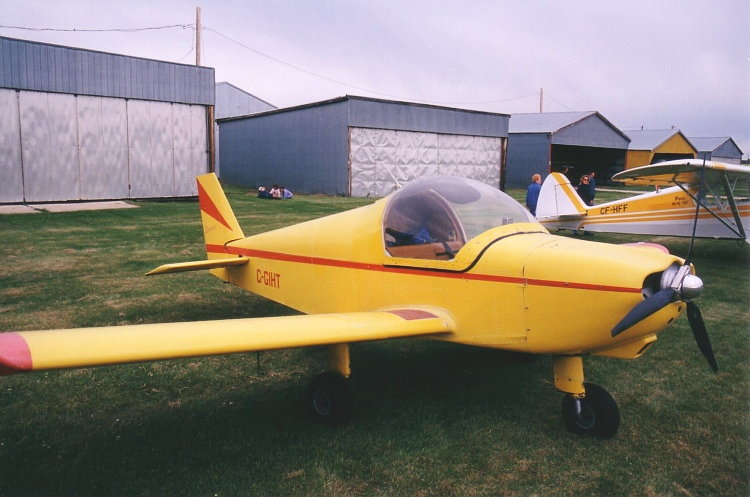
- CH 200

General information
- Type: Homebuilt light aircraft
- National origin: France/Canada
- Manufacturer: Zenair
- Designer: Chris Heintz

History
- First flight: 22 March 1970

The Zenair Zenith CH 200 and CH 250 are a family of Canadian single-engined homebuilt light aircraft. It is a low-winged single engine monoplane, that was first flown in France in 1970, with kits being made by the Canadian company Zenair from 1974, with hundreds built and flown.

== Development and design ==
In October 1968, the French aeronautical engineer Chris Heintz, who worked for Avions Pierre Robin, started work on the design of a two-seat all-metal light aircraft suitable for amateur construction, the Zenith, with the prototype making its maiden flight on 22 March 1970.

Heintz migrated to Canada in 1973, and set up Zenair in 1974 to sell plans and kits of the Zénith. The Zenith, which gained the designation Zenith CH 200 when Heintz produced plans for larger and smaller derivatives, is a low-winged cantilever monoplane of all metal construction. The pilot and passenger sit side by side under a clear, sideways-opening plexiglas canopy, while the aircraft is fitted with a fixed nosewheel undercarriage. It is designed to be powered by a single piston engine of between 85 and 160 hp (63.5 and 119 kW).

The first Zenith to be built in North America flew in October 1975, and by 1976, over 300 plans had been sold. Plans continued to be available in 1999, by which time hundreds were flying.

At the 1976 EAA Convention in Oshkosh, Wisconsin the factory used volunteer labour to build and fly a CH 200 in eight days, using 550 person-hours.

== Variants ==
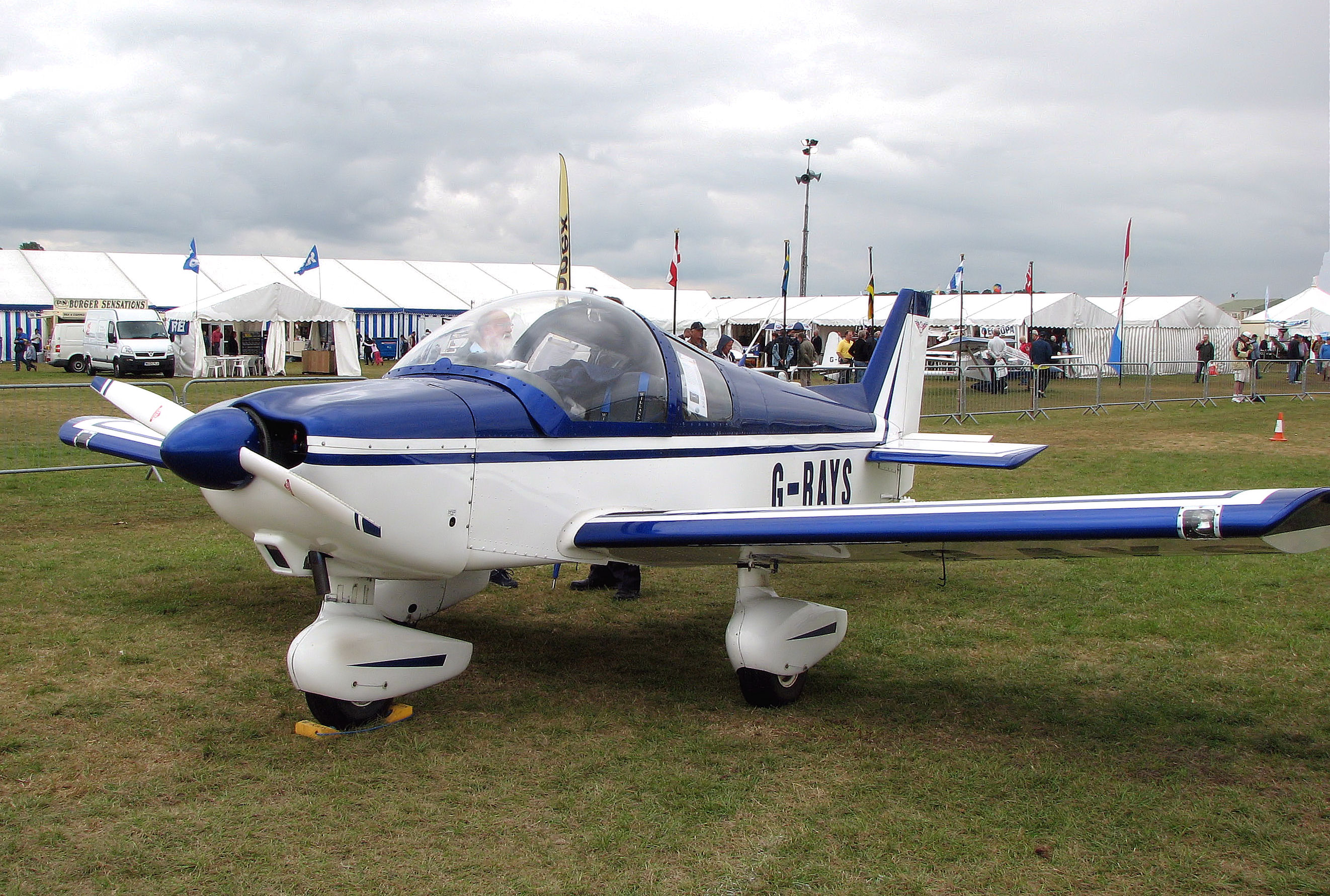
Zenair CH 250

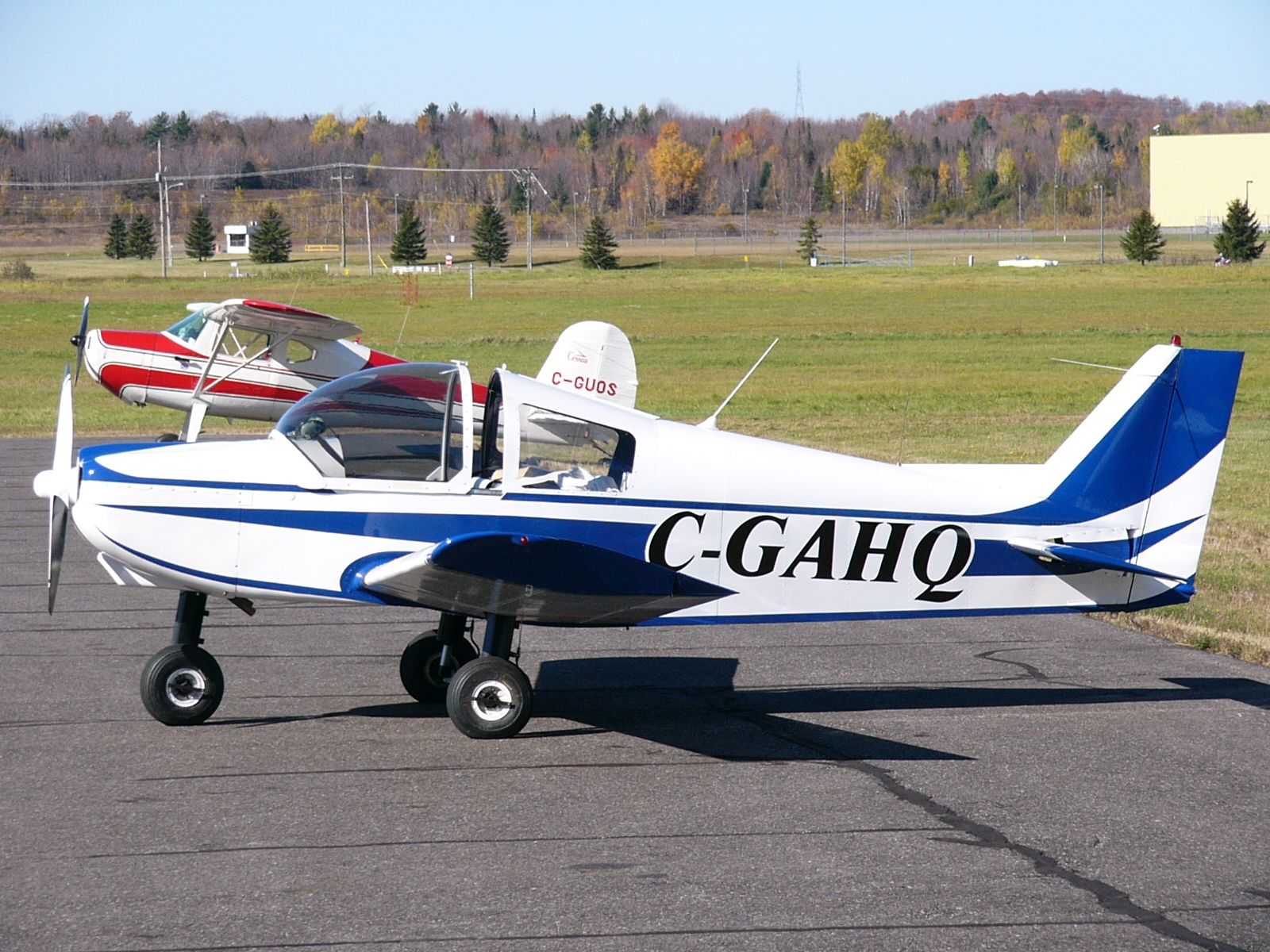
Zenair CH 250

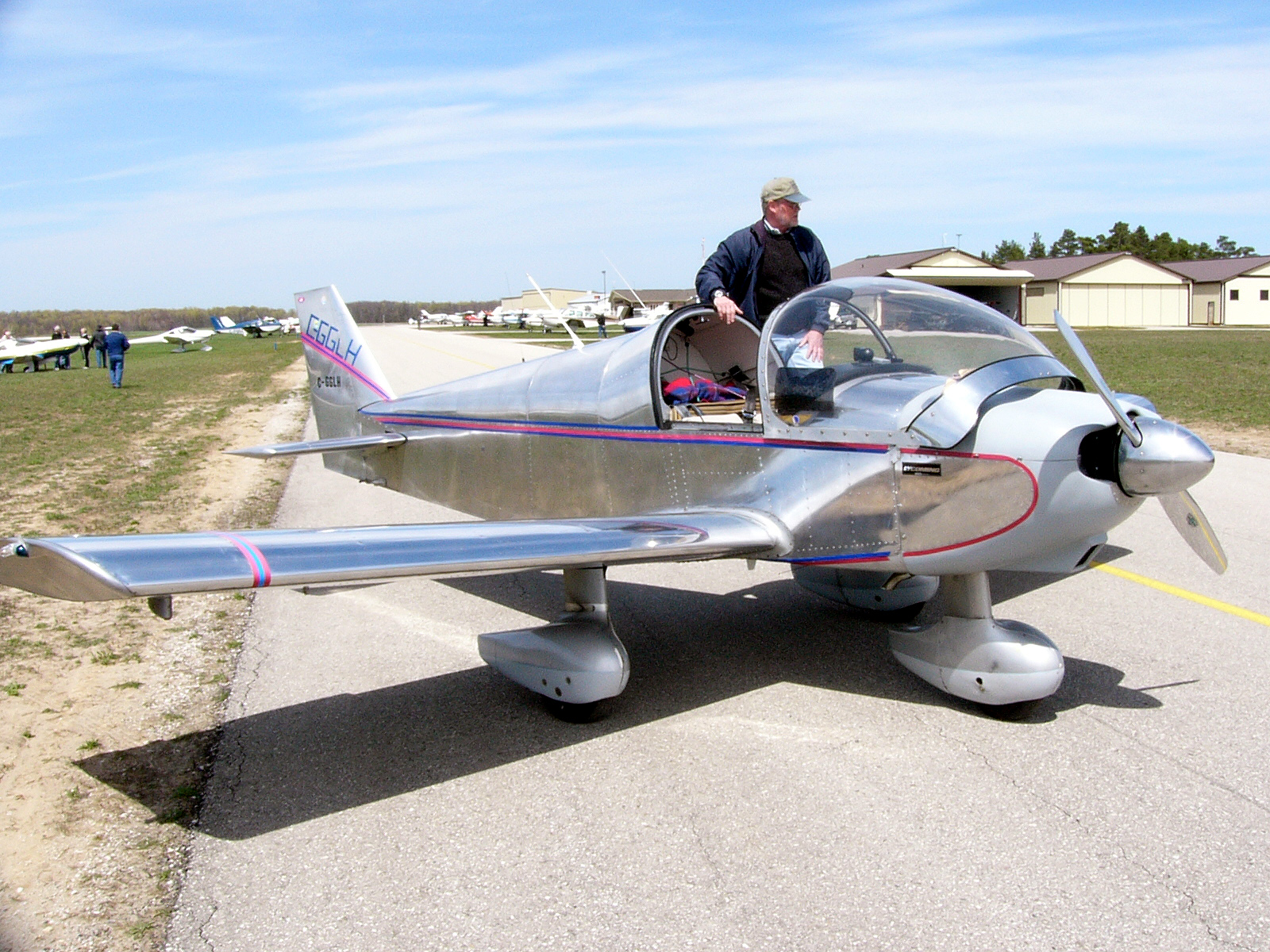
Zenair CH 200 with forward sliding canopy

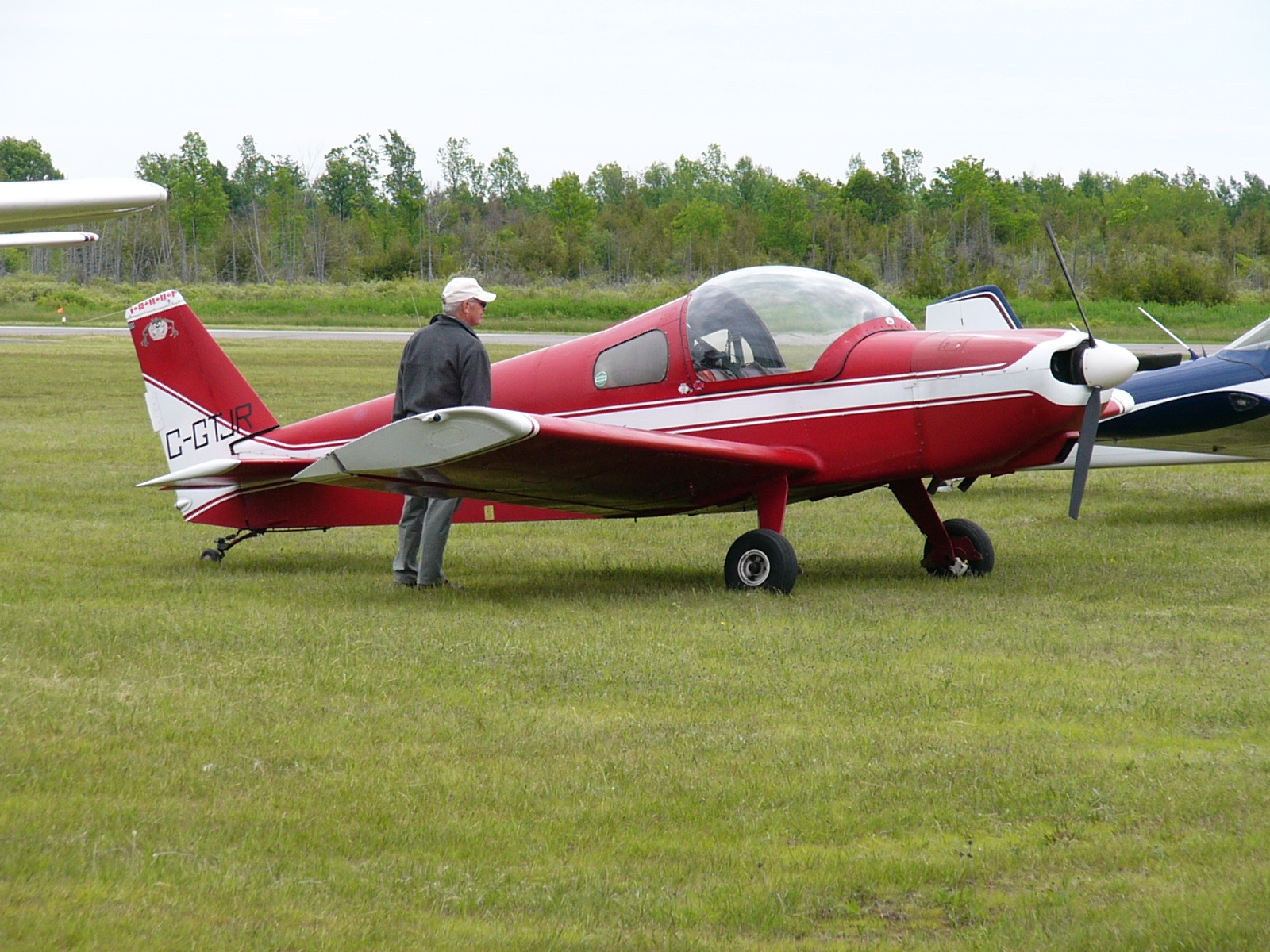
Zenair CH 250 TD with conventional landing gear

Zenair CH 200
Initial version. Could be built as a cross country cruiser with an engine of 85 to 125 hp (63 to 93 kW) or as an aerobatic trainer with modifications and a powerplant producing 125 to 160 hp (93 to 119 kW). The aircraft can be constructed as a taildragger or on tricycle gear and flown as a skiplane or on floats.
Zenair CH 250
Improved version with more fuel, larger baggage area, rear windows and a forward sliding canopy.
Zenair CH 250 TD
"Tail Dragger" version with conventional landing gear.

== Specifications (100 hp engine) ==
Data from Jane's All The World's Aircraft 1982-83

General characteristics

- Crew: 2
- Length: 20 ft 6 in (6.25 m)
- Wingspan: 23 ft 0 in (7.00 m)
- Height: 6 ft 11 in (2.11 m)
- Wing area: 105.5 sq ft (9.80 m^{2})
- Aspect ratio: 5:1
- Airfoil: NACA 64A515 (Modified)
- Empty weight: 900 lb (408 kg)
- Max takeoff weight: 1,450 lb (658 kg)
- Fuel capacity: 16 Imp Gallons (72.5 L)
- Powerplant: 1 × Continental O-200 air-cooled flat-four, 100 hp (75 kW) (suitable for engines of between 85 hp (63.5 kW) and 160 hp (119 kW))

Performance

- Maximum speed: 147 mph (237 km/h, 128 kn) at sea level
- Cruise speed: 130 mph (210 km/h, 110 kn) (75% power) at sea level
- Stall speed: 53 mph (85 km/h, 46 kn) (flaps down)
- Range: 520 mi (840 km, 450 nmi)
- Service ceiling: 15,100 ft (4,600 m)
- Rate of climb: 800 ft/min (4.1 m/s)

== See also ==
- Bede BD-1

Related development

- Zenair CH 100
