= List of aircraft (Ta) =

This is a list of aircraft in alphabetical order beginning with 'Ta'.

== Ta ==
=== Tachihi ===
(New Tachikawa Aircraft Company Ltd (新立川飛行機株式会社 Shin Tachikawa Kōkūki Kabushiki Kaisha)

- Tachihi R-52
- Tachihi R-53
- Tachihi R-HM

=== Tachikawa ===
(Tachikawa Aircraft Company Limited (立川飛行機株式会社, Tachikawa Kōkūki K.K.?))

- Tachikawa A-26
- Tachikawa KKY (Kogata Kei Kanja Yusoki - Small Type Patient Transport))
- Tachikawa KKY-2 (Kogata Kei Kanja Yusoki Kaizogata - Small Type Patient Transport Modified)
- Tachikawa KS (Kogata Sokuryoki - Small Survey Aircraft)
- Tachikawa R.5
- Tachikawa R.38
- Tachikawa SS-1
- Tachikawa T.S. 1
- Tachikawa-Beechcraft C17E Light Transport
- Tachikawa Ki-9
- Tachikawa Ki-17
- Tachikawa Ki-24
- Tachikawa Ki-25
- Tachikawa Ki-26
- Tachikawa Ki-36
- Tachikawa Ki-54
- Tachikawa Ki-55
- Tachikawa Ki-70
- Tachikawa Ki-72
- Tachikawa Ki-74
- Tachikawa Ki-77
- Tachikawa Ki-92
- Tachikawa Ki-94
- Tachikawa Ki-110
- Tachikawa Ki-111
- Tachikawa Ki-114
- Tachikawa Army Small and Light Ambulance Aircraft
- Tachikawa Army Type 95-1 Medium Grade Trainer Model A
- Tachikawa Army Type 95-3 Basic Grade Trainer Model A
- Tachikawa Army Type 98 Direct Co-operation Plane
- Tachikawa Army Type 99 Advanced Trainer
- Tachikawa Army Type 1 Advanced Trainer
- Tachikawa Army Type 1 Operations Trainer
- Tachikawa Army Type 1 Transport
- Tachikawa Army Type 1 Patrol Bomber
- Tachikawa-Lockheed Type-B high-altitude research aircraft

=== Taft ===
((Philip E) Taft Airplane Corp, Elizabeth City, NC 1930: Acquired by Whittlesey Ltd.)

- Taft Kingfisher
- Taft X

=== Taggart ===
(United States)

- Taggart GyroBee

=== Ta-Ho-Ma ===
(Ta-Ho-Ma Airplane & Motor Co (Pres: B H Vanderveld), 64 W Randolph St, Chicago, IL)

- Ta-Ho-Ma A
- Ta-Ho-Ma B

=== Task ===
(Task Research, Inc., Santa Paula, CA / Stanley K. Franks / Jim Kern)

- Franks-Task Silhouette)
- Task TR-60 Silhouette

=== TAI ===
(Turkish Aerospace Industries)

- TAI ZIU (Zirai Ilaçlama Uçagi)
- TAI Hürkuş
- TAI/AgustaWestland T-129 ATAK
- TAI Hürjet

=== Taifun ===
(Taifun Flugzeugbau GmbH)

- Taifun Me 108F Taifun

=== Taina ===
(Beau and Ryan Berkley, Paradise, CA)

- Taina Mid-Wing

=== Tairov ===
(Designer: Vsevolod Konstantinovich Tairov)

- OKO-1
- OKO-4
- OKO-6
- OKO-6bis
- OKO-7
- Ta-1
- Ta-3
- Ta-3bis

=== Taiwan Dancer Aviation ===
(Taiwan Dancer Technology Co., Ltd, Nan Gang Village, Da Yuan Township, Tao Yuan County, Taiwan)

- Taiwan Dancer TD-1
- Taiwan Dancer TD-2
- Taiwan Dancer TD-3

=== Takasou ===
(Takayuki Takasou)

- Takasou No.1 Aeroplane
- Takasou No.2 Aeroplane
- Takasou No.3 Aeroplane
- Takasou No.4 Aeroplane
- Takasou No.5 Aeroplane
- Takasou TN-6

=== Take Off GmbH ===
(Hamm, Germany)

- Take Off Minimum
- Take Off Maximum
- Take Off Merlin

=== Tallmantz ===
(Tallmantz Aviation Inc (merger: Paul Mantz, Frank Tallman), Orange Co Airport, Santa Ana, CA)

- Tallmantz P-1 Phoenix
- Tallmantz Ryan NYP replica

=== Talpade ===
- Talpade's aircraft

=== Tamai ===
(Seitaro Tamai & Terutaka Tamai)

- Tamai No.1 Seaplane
- Tamai 2 Nippon-go
- Tamai 3
- Tamai No.5
- Tamai No.24

=== Tampier ===
(René Tampier)

- Tampier Avion automobile
- Tampier T.4
- Tampier T.6

=== Tandem Aircraft KG ===
(Saulgau, Germany)

- Tandem Aircraft Sunny
- Tandem Aircraft Sunny Sportster

=== Tangent ===
(Tangent Aircraft)

- Tangent EMG-5

=== Tapanee ===
(Tapanee Aviation, Inc)

- Tapanee Levitation 2
- Tapanee Levitation 4
- Tapanee Pegazair-100

=== Tarrant ===
(W.G Tarrant Ltd)

- Tarrant Tabor

=== Tarriaut ===
- Tarriaut T.1

=== TAT ===
(Tunisia Aero Technologies)

- TAT Jbelassa
- TAT Super Nasnas
- TAT Nasnas
- TAT Aoussou
- TAT Jbelassa
- TAT Jbelassa
- TAT Jbelassa

=== Tatin ===
(Victor Tatin)

- Tatin 1907 monoplane

=== Tatra ===
(Ringhoffer-Tatra Works Ltd.)

- Tatra T.001
- Tatra T.101
- Tatra T.201
- Tatra T.301
- Tatra T.126
- Tatra T.131

=== Taubman ===
( S Taubman Aircraft Co, 40 South Howard St, Akron, OH)

- Taubman LC-11 All-American
- Taubman LC-13

=== Taawney ===
- Tawney Owl

=== Taylor ===
(John Taylor)

- Taylor J.T.1 Monoplane
- Taylor J.T.2 Titch

=== Taylor ===
(Fred taylor)

- Taylor A.101 Bedstead
- Taylor B.102
- Taylor C.103 Wagtail
- Taylor D.104

=== Taylor ===
((H B) Taylor Automobile Works, 1119 11th St, Las Vegas, NM)

- Taylor Thunderbird

=== Taylor ===
(Truman F Taylor, Honolulu, HI)

- Territory of Taylor

=== Taylor ===
(Thomas Taylor)

- Taylor 1

=== Taylor ===
(Moulton B "Molt" Taylor, Chehalis and Longview, WA)

- Taylor Aerocar
- Taylor Aerocar II Aeroplane aka 1-A
- Taylor Aerocar III aka 1-C
- Taylor Bullet
- Taylor Coot A
- Taylor Coot B
- Taylor Sooper-Coot Model A
- Taylor IMP
- Taylor Micro-IMP
- Taylor Mini-IMP
- Taylor Ultra-IMP

=== Taylor ===
(L A Taylor, Longview, TX)

- Taylor 1936 Monoplane

=== Taylor ===
(Merton Taylor, Whitewater, WI)

- Taylor Tater Bug
- Taylor Topper

=== Taylor ===
(Ralph Taylor)

- Taylor Rapid Transit

=== Taylor ===
(Donald E Taylor, Evansville, IN)

- Taylor Tinker Toy

=== Taylor ===
(Taylor Aero Industries, Westminster, CA)

- Taylor Bird

=== Taylor-Watkinson ===
(C.W. Taylor & E.T. Watkinson)

- Taylor-Watkinson DB.100 Dingbat

=== Taylor Brothers Aircraft Company ===
( Taylor Bros Aircraft Co, Emery Field, Bradford, PA)

- North Star Loomis Special
- Taylor Special
- Arrowing A-2 Chummy originally just Chummy
- Taylor B-2 Chummy
- Taylor C-2 Chummy
- Taylor E-2 Cub
- Taylor F-2 Cub
- Taylor G-2 Cub
- Taylor H-2 Cub
- Taylor J-2 Cub
- Taylor J-2S Cub
- Taylor-Young Model A

=== Taylorcraft ===
(Taylorcraft Aviation Corporation, Alliance, 27 D St, Bradford, PA)

- Taylorcraft C-95 Grasshopper
- Taylorcraft L-2 Grasshopper
- Taylorcraft LBT
- Taylorcraft LNT
- Taylorcraft O-57 Grasshopper
- Taylorcraft TG-6
- Taylorcraft A
- Taylorcraft B
  - Taylorcraft BC Continental engine
  - Taylorcraft BF Franklin engine
  - Taylorcraft BL Lycoming engine
- Taylorcraft D
  - Taylorcraft DC Continental engine
  - Taylorcraft DF Franklin engine
  - Taylorcraft DL Lycoming engine
- Taylorcraft 47
- Taylorcraft Ace
- Taylorcraft Foursome
- Taylorcraft Tourist
- Taylorcraft Traveler
- Taylorcraft De Luxe 65
- Taylorcraft De Luxe 85
- Taylorcraft Sportsman
- Taylorcraft Special De Luxe

=== Taylorcraft ===
(Taylorcraft Aviation Corp (Charles & Dorothy Feris), Alliance, OH)

- Taylorcraft 15
- Taylorcraft 16
- Taylorcraft 18
- Taylorcraft F-19
- Taylorcraft 20 Ranch Wagon
- Taylorcraft 20 Ag Topper
- Taylorcraft 20 Zephyr 400
- Taylorcraft F-21
- Taylorcraft F-22
- Taylorcraft Ranch Wagon
- Taylorcraft Topper
- Taylorcraft Seabird

=== Taylorcraft Aeroplanes (England) Limited ===
- Taylorcraft Plus C
- Taylorcraft Plus D
- Taylorcraft Auster I
- Taylorcraft Auster II
- Taylorcraft Auster III/Model E
- Taylorcraft Auster IV/Model G
- Taylorcraft Auster V/Model J
