= Tairov (disambiguation) =

Tairov is a village in Armavir province, Armenia.

Tairov may also refer to:

== Places ==
- Tairove, urban settlement in the Ovidiopol Raion, Odesa Oblast (province) of southern Ukraine

== People ==
- Alexander Tairov (1885–1950), theatre director
- Abdimajit Tairov (born 1974), Uzbekistan football defender
- Vasiliy Tairov (1859-1938), аrmenian and soviet scientist, professor
- Vsevolod Konstantinovich Tairov (1900—1941), soviet aircraft designer

== Aircraft series ==
- Tairov OKO-1, passenger transport aircraft produced in the Ukrainian SSR in the USSR in 1937
- Tairov OKO-4, attack aircraft produced in the Ukrainian SSR in the USSR in 1939
- Tairov OKO-7, heavy fighter produced in the Ukraine region of the USSR in 1940
- Tairov Ta-3, twin-engined single-seat escort fighter designed and produced in the Ukrainian SSR in the USSR from 1939

== See also ==
- Tairo (disambiguation)
