= Oko (disambiguation) =

Oko is a Russian missile defense system. Oko may also refer to:

== Geography ==
- Oko, Warmian-Masurian Voivodeship, a settlement in Poland
- Oko-Akarè, an arrondissement in Benin
- Oko River, a river in Guyana
- Okoh Town, a town in Nigeria

== Languages ==
- Oko language, a Niger–Congo language
- Oko-Juwoi language, an extinct, unrelated Great Andamanese language
- Old Korean (ISO 639-3 code)

== People ==
- Adolph S. Oko Jr. (1904-1963), aship captain who supported the establishment of Israel
- Ataa Oko (1919–2012), Ghanaian artist
- Dorothy Kuhn Oko (1896–1971), librarian and labor unionist
- Oko Jumbo (died 1891), Nigerian traditional ruler
- Seiji Oko (born 1948), Japanese volleyball player

== Science and technology ==
- OKO (company) (Opytno KonstrooktOrskoye), a Kiev-based manufacturer of aircraft, such as the Tairov OKO-1, Tairov OKO-4, and Tairov OKO-7
- Öko-Institut, a German research institute
- US-K, also known as Oko, a satellite in the Oko system

== Other uses ==
- Oko (orisha), a divine spirit in the Yoruba religion
- Oko (band), a Yugoslav rock band
- OKO, a building complex in the Moscow International Business Center

- OKO Tower, a skyscraper in the complex

- OK Orchestra, a 2021 studio album by AJR
- Oko, a character in the children's television show It's a Big Big World
- ÖkoDAX, a German stock market index
- Orisha Oko, a spirit in the Yoruba religion
- Yokota Air Base, a military air force airport in Tokyo, Japan

== See also ==
- List of Oko satellites
- Okko (disambiguation)
