= Tapanee Aviation =

Canadian aircraft manufacturer

Tapanee Aviation, Inc.
- Company type: Privately held company
- Industry: Aerospace
- Headquarters: Mont-Saint-Michel, Quebec, Canada
- Products: Kit aircraft
- Website: www.tapanee.com

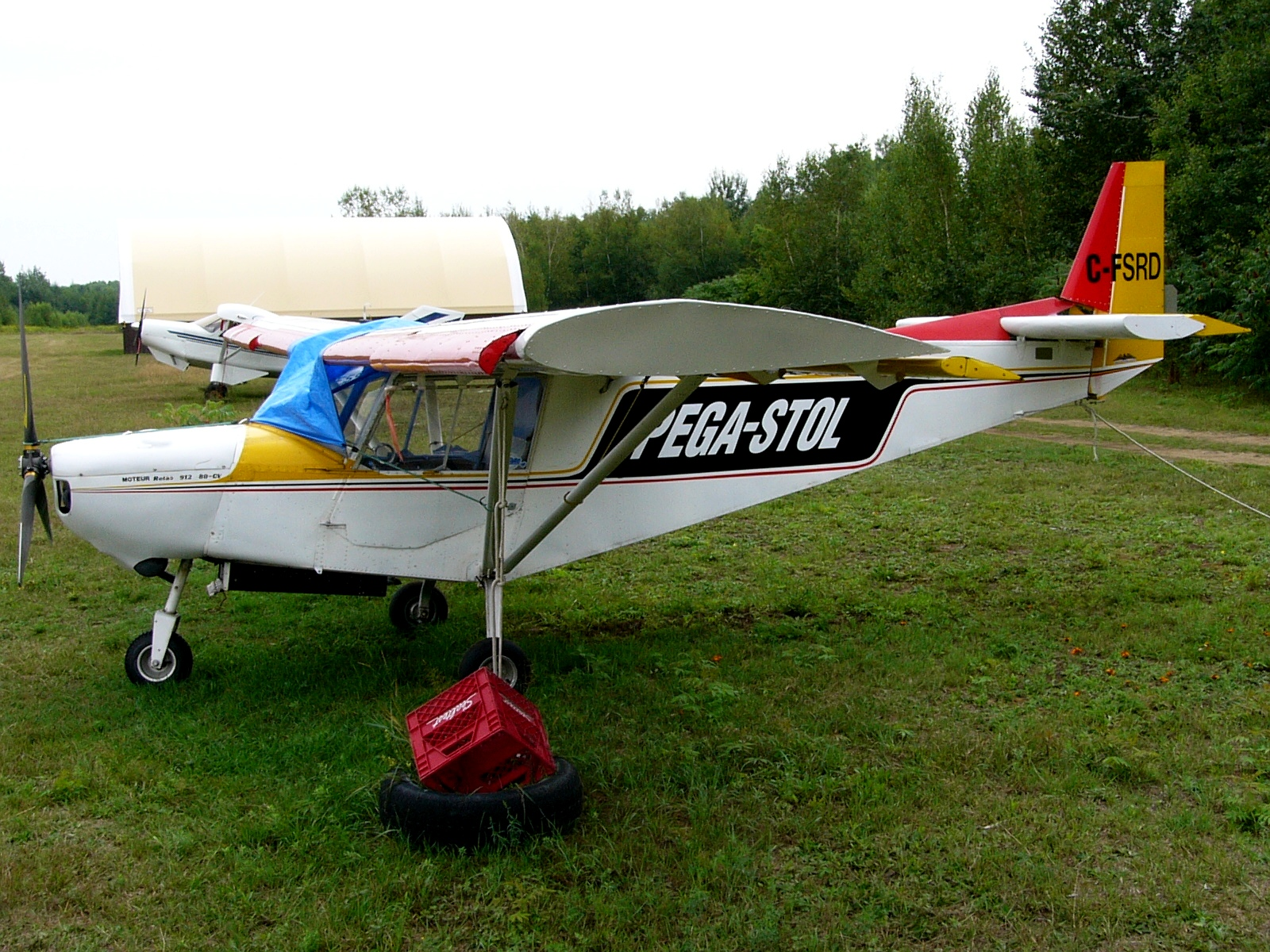
A Zenith STOL CH 701 with the Pegastol wing

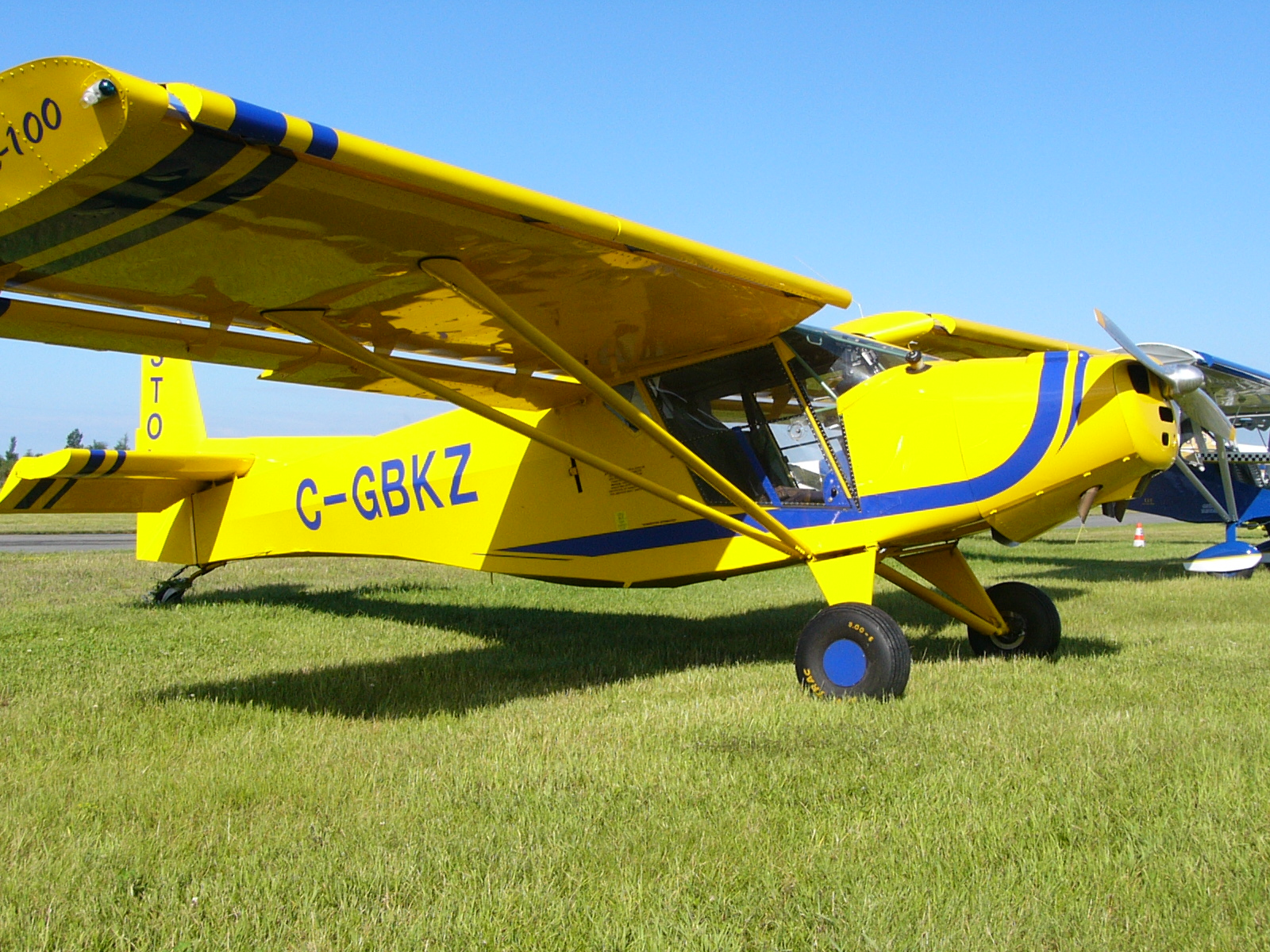
Tapanee Pegazair-100

Tapanee Aviation, Inc. is a Canadian aircraft manufacturer based in Mont-Saint-Michel, Quebec. The company specializes in the design and manufacture of STOL light aircraft in the form of plans and kits for amateur construction.

Tapanee Aviation began producing wing replacement kits for the Zenith STOL CH 701 featuring retractable leading-edge slats. Later the company designed a new fuselage to go with the wings, which became the Tapanee Pegazair-80 and the development Tapanee Pegazair-100. Later the two-seat Tapanee Levitation 2 and four-seat Tapanee Levitation 4 models were added, although the Levitation 2 is no longer offered.

== Aircraft ==
Summary of aircraft built by Tapanee Aviation
Model name	First flight	Number built	Type
Tapanee Pegazair-80	June 1991		Two-seat STOL light aircraft
Tapanee Pegazair-100		35 (2011)	Two-seat STOL light aircraft
Tapanee Levitation 2	2007	1 (2011)	Two-seat STOL light aircraft
Tapanee Levitation 4	2002	3 (Dec 2011)	Four-seat STOL light aircraft
