= Zenith Aircraft Company =

Aircraft manufacturer in the United States

Coordinates: 39°09′26.9″N 91°49′24.5″W

- Company type: Private
- Industry: Aerospace
- Founded: 1992; 33 years ago in Mexico, Missouri

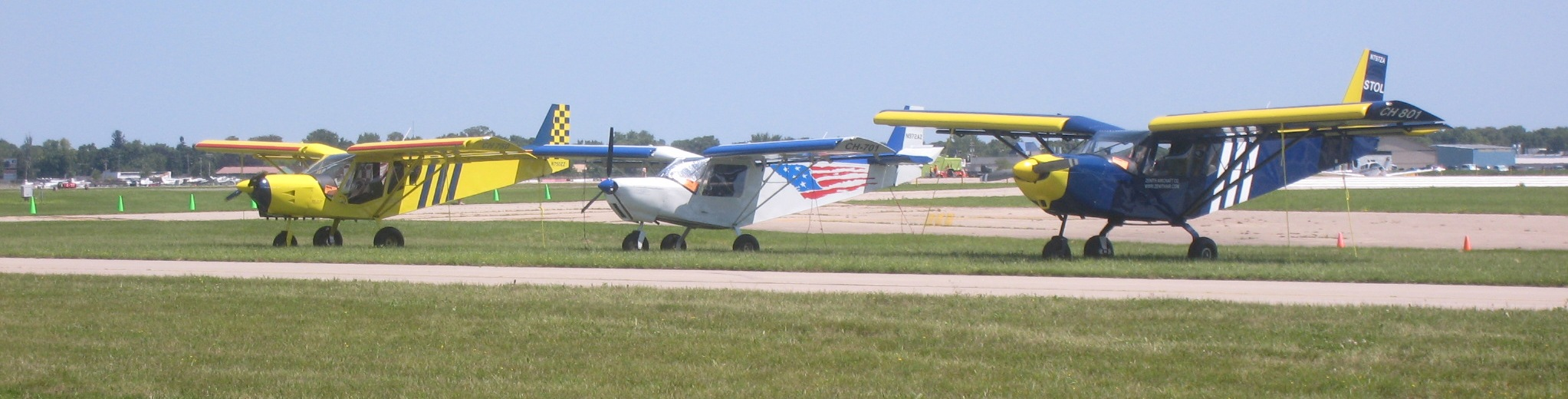
Zenith CH-750, CH-701, CH-801

Zenith Aircraft Company is a designer, developer and manufacturer of kit aircraft.

== History ==
The independent, privately owned company was formed in 1992 in Mexico, Missouri, and is based in 20,000+ sq. ft. production facilities at Mexico Memorial Airport. Zenith Aircraft Company has acquired the rights to manufacture and market Zenair kit aircraft designs from designer Chris Heintz of Zenair Ltd. His son Sebastian is listed as the owner of Zenith Aircraft Company.

Kit designs manufactured by the company include the original two-seat STOL CH 701, a high-wing all-metal short take-off and landing design, the larger STOL CH 801 four-place aircraft, the STOL CH 750 light sport utility kit airplane, and the two-seat CH 650, an all-metal low-wing cruiser. Other than the 801, these designs may be built to meet the FAA's light-sport aircraft (LSA) definition for operation by Sport Pilots.

In February 2014, the company announced that it had shipped 10,000 sets of plans to aircraft builders in over 50 countries.

In January 2016, Zenith Aircraft announced that it had purchased the intellectual property including the Sam LS design previously produced by Sam Aircraft, and was planning to produce kits alongside the existing Chris Heintz designs.

== Aircraft ==
- Zenith STOL CH701
- Zenith STOL CH 750
