= MYJ =

MYJ or myj may refer to:

- MYJ, the ICAO code for Mexico Memorial Airport, Missouri, United States
- MYJ, the IATA code for Matsuyama Airport, Ehime, Japan
- myj, the ISO 639-3 code for Mangaya language, South Sudan
