= Tapanee Levitation 2 =

Canadian homebuilt STOL light aircraft

Levitation 2

General information
- Type: Amateur-built aircraft
- National origin: Canada
- Manufacturer: Tapanee Aviation
- Status: Production completed (2012)
- Number built: One

History
- Introduction date: 2007
- Variant: Tapanee Levitation 4

The Tapanee Levitation 2 is a Canadian STOL amateur-built aircraft, designed and produced by Tapanee Aviation of Mont-Saint-Michel, Quebec. The aircraft is supplied as a kit for amateur construction.

The Levitation 2 was offered for sale in 2011, but as of 2012 the company no longer advertises that it is available.

== Design and development ==
The aircraft is a two-seat development of the four-seat Tapanee Levitation 4. It features a strut-braced high wing, an enclosed cockpit with two seats in side-by-side configuration that is 48 in (122 cm) wide, fixed tricycle landing gear and a single engine in tractor configuration.

The Levitation 2 is made from welded steel tubing and aluminum, with its flying surfaces covered with doped aircraft fabric. Its 31.5 ft (9.6 m) span wing has an area of 166 sq ft (15.4 m^{2}) and mounts flaps. The wing is supported by "V" struts and jury struts. The aircraft's recommended engine power range is 150 to 220 hp (112 to 164 kW) and standard engines used include the 160 hp (119 kW) Lycoming O-320 four-stroke powerplant. Construction time from the supplied kit is estimated as 1750 hours.

== Operational history ==
In 2007 a single example was registered with Transport Canada and in December 2011 the company reported one aircraft had been completed.

== Specifications (Levitation 2) ==
Data from Kitplanes

General characteristics

- Crew: one
- Capacity: one passenger
- Length: 23.8 ft (7.3 m)
- Wingspan: 31.5 ft (9.6 m)
- Wing area: 166 sq ft (15.4 m^{2})
- Empty weight: 1,276 lb (579 kg)
- Gross weight: 2,300 lb (1,043 kg)
- Fuel capacity: 65 U.S. gallons (250 L; 54 imp gal)
- Powerplant: 1 × Lycoming O-320 four cylinder, air-cooled, four stroke aircraft engine, 160 hp (120 kW)

Performance

- Cruise speed: 115 mph (185 km/h, 100 kn)
- Stall speed: 35 mph (56 km/h, 30 kn)
- Range: 875 mi (1,408 km, 760 nmi)
- Rate of climb: 900 ft/min (4.6 m/s)
- Wing loading: 13.9 lb/sq ft (68 kg/m^{2})
