= Zenith STOL CH 801 =

Type of aircraft

Zenair CH 801
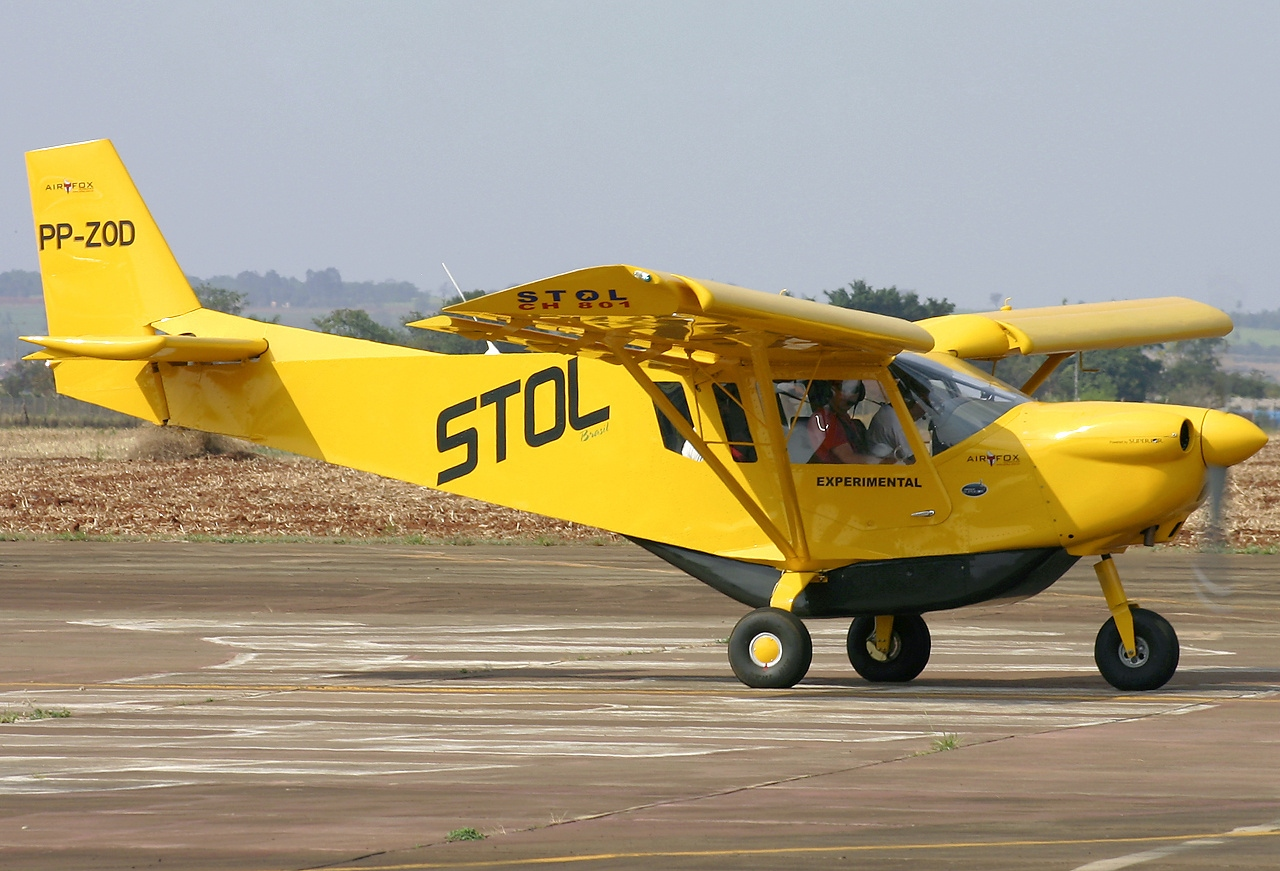

General information
- Type: STOL aircraft
- Manufacturer: Zenith Aircraft Company
- Designer: Chris Heintz
- Number built: 160 (December 2011)

History
- Developed from: Zenith STOL CH701

The Zenith STOL CH 801 is a four-seat sport STOL aircraft developed by Chris Heintz and available in kit form from the Zenith Aircraft Company.

== Design and development ==
The CH 801 is based on the general design and features of the smaller two-place STOL CH 701 model. It offers a useful load of 1,000 lb (450 kg), which is double the 701's 500 lb (230 kg). While both aircraft look alike they do not share any common parts.

The STOL CH 801 is made from sheet aluminium and employs a deep wing chord, full-length leading edge slats and trailing edge flaperons to develop high lift at low speed, while maintaining a short wing-span for maximum strength and ground maneuverability.

By the end of 2011, 160 CH 801s had been completed and were flying.

== Specifications (CH 801) ==
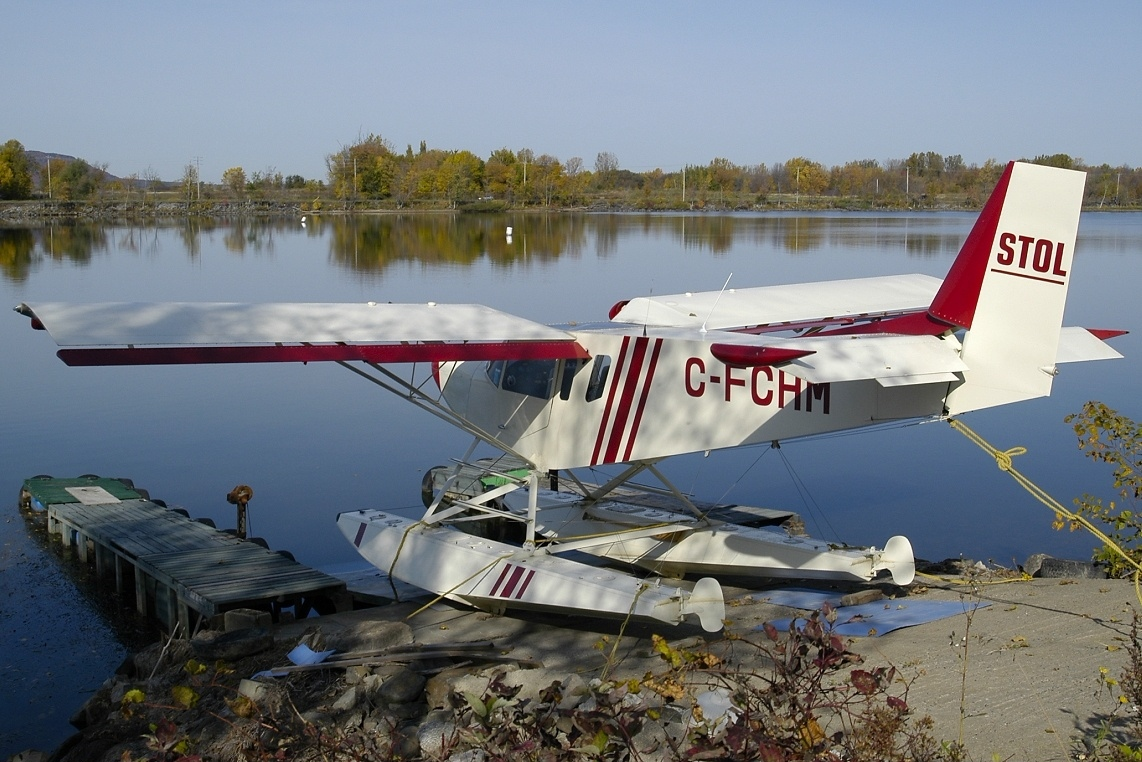
CH801 on floats

Data from Source: Kitplanes magazine

General characteristics

- Crew: one pilot
- Capacity: three passengers and 1050 lb (475 kg) useful load
- Length: 24 ft 6 in (7.47 m)
- Wingspan: 27 ft 0 in (8.23 m)
- Wing area: 167 sq ft (15.5 m^{2})
- Empty weight: 1,150 lb (523 kg)
- Gross weight: 2,200 lb (998 kg)
- Max takeoff weight: 2,200 lb (998 kg)
- Powerplant: 1 × Lycoming O-360 , 180 hp (135 kW)

Performance

- Cruise speed: 105 mph (170 km/h, 91 kn)
- Stall speed: 39 mph (63 km/h, 34 kn)
- Range: 370 mi (600 km, 320 nmi)
- Rate of climb: 1,200 ft/min (6.2 m/s)
- Power/mass: 12.2 lb/hp (0.13 kW/kg)
