= Zenith STOL CH 701 =

Canadian family of light, two-seat aircraft

CH 701 & CH 750
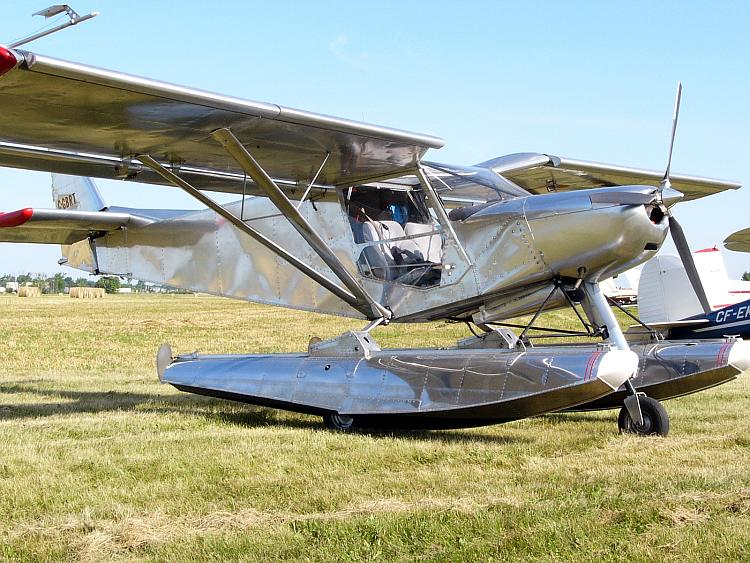
- Zenair CH 701 on amphibious floats

General information
- Type: Kit aircraft
- Manufacturer: Zenith Aircraft Company
- Designer: Chris Heintz
- Status: In production
- Number built: 870 (CH 701, December 2011); 45 (CH 750, December 2011)

History
- Manufactured: 1986–present
- Introduction date: 1986
- First flight: 1986
- Variant: Zenith STOL CH 801

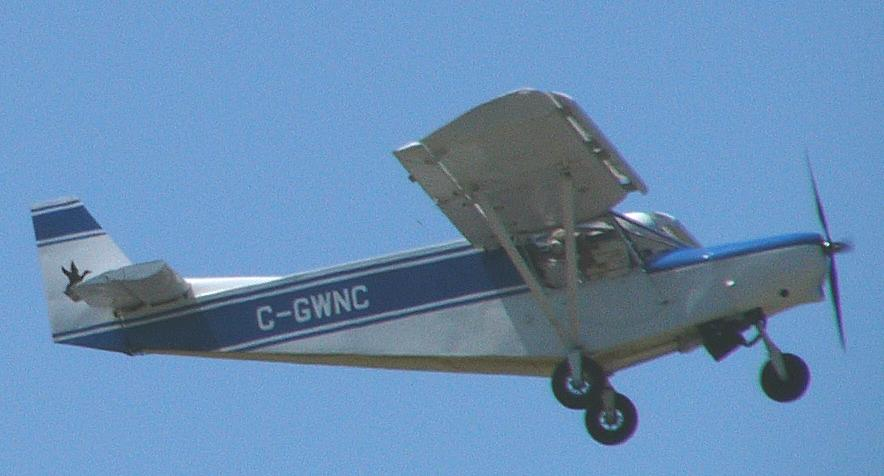
A Zenith STOL CH 701 on wheels

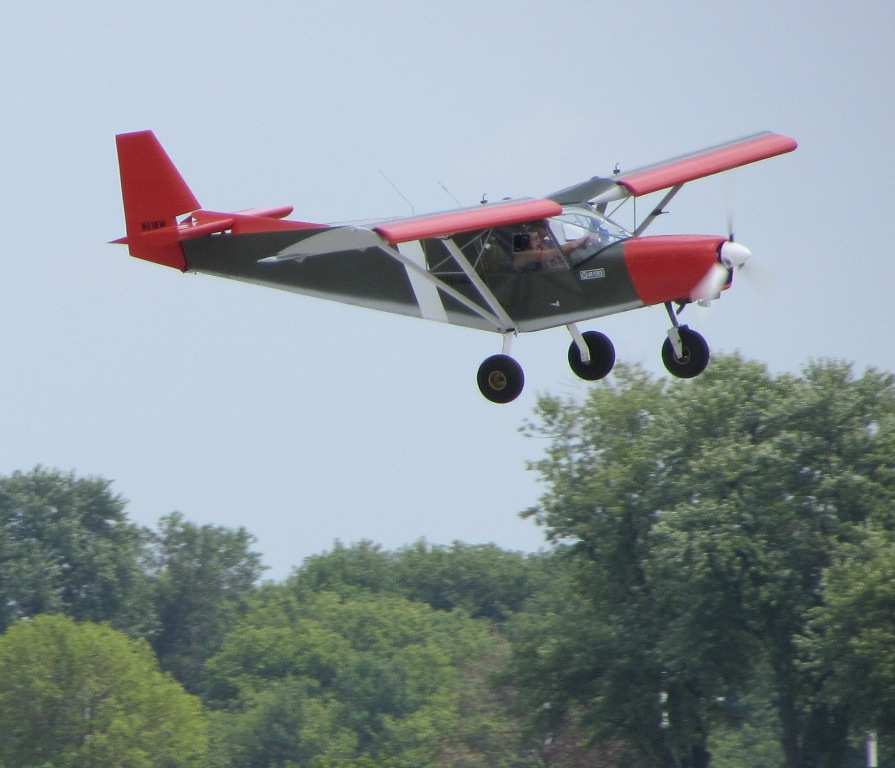
A Czech Aircraft Works-built CH 701

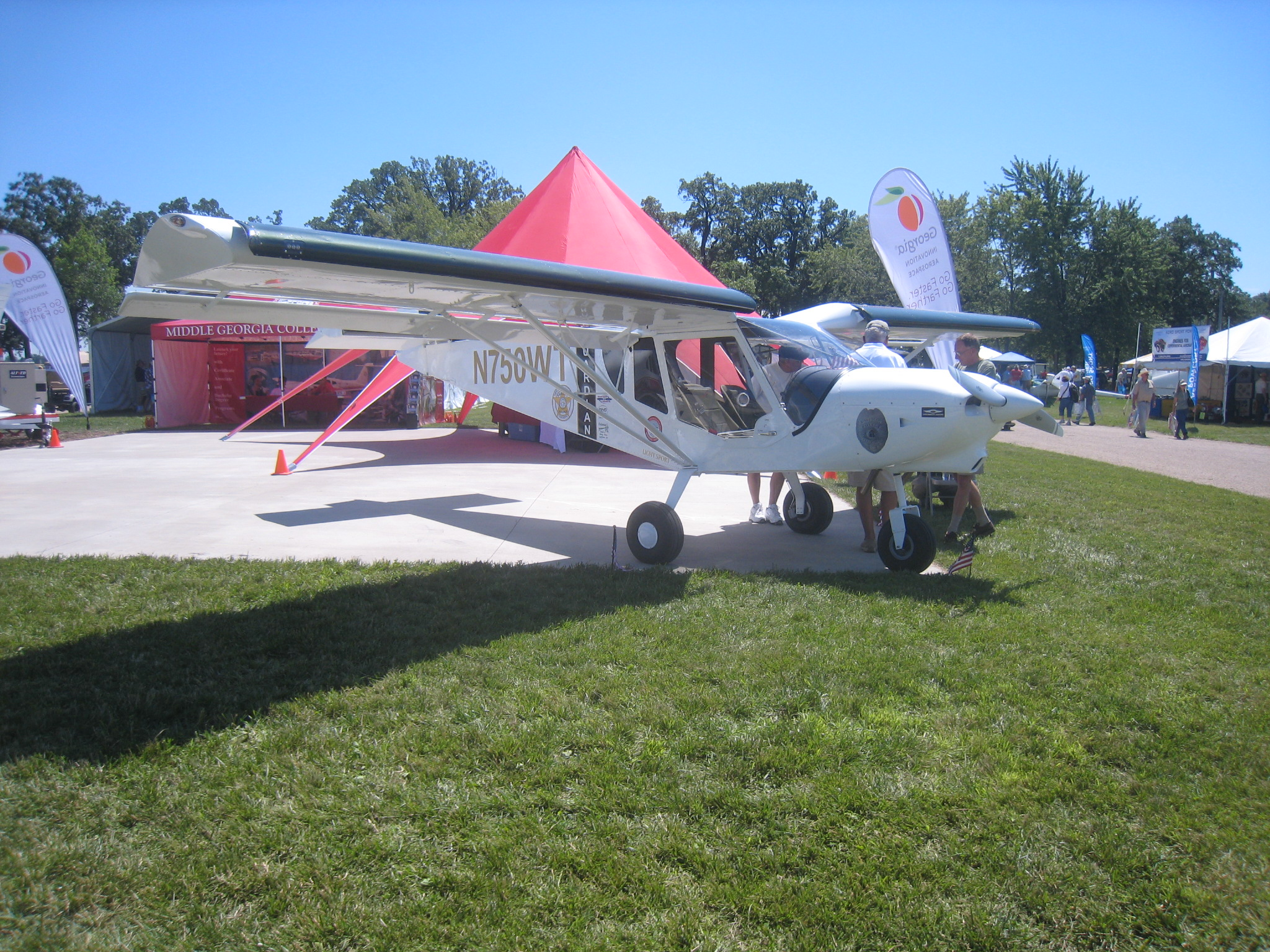
AMD-built CH 750

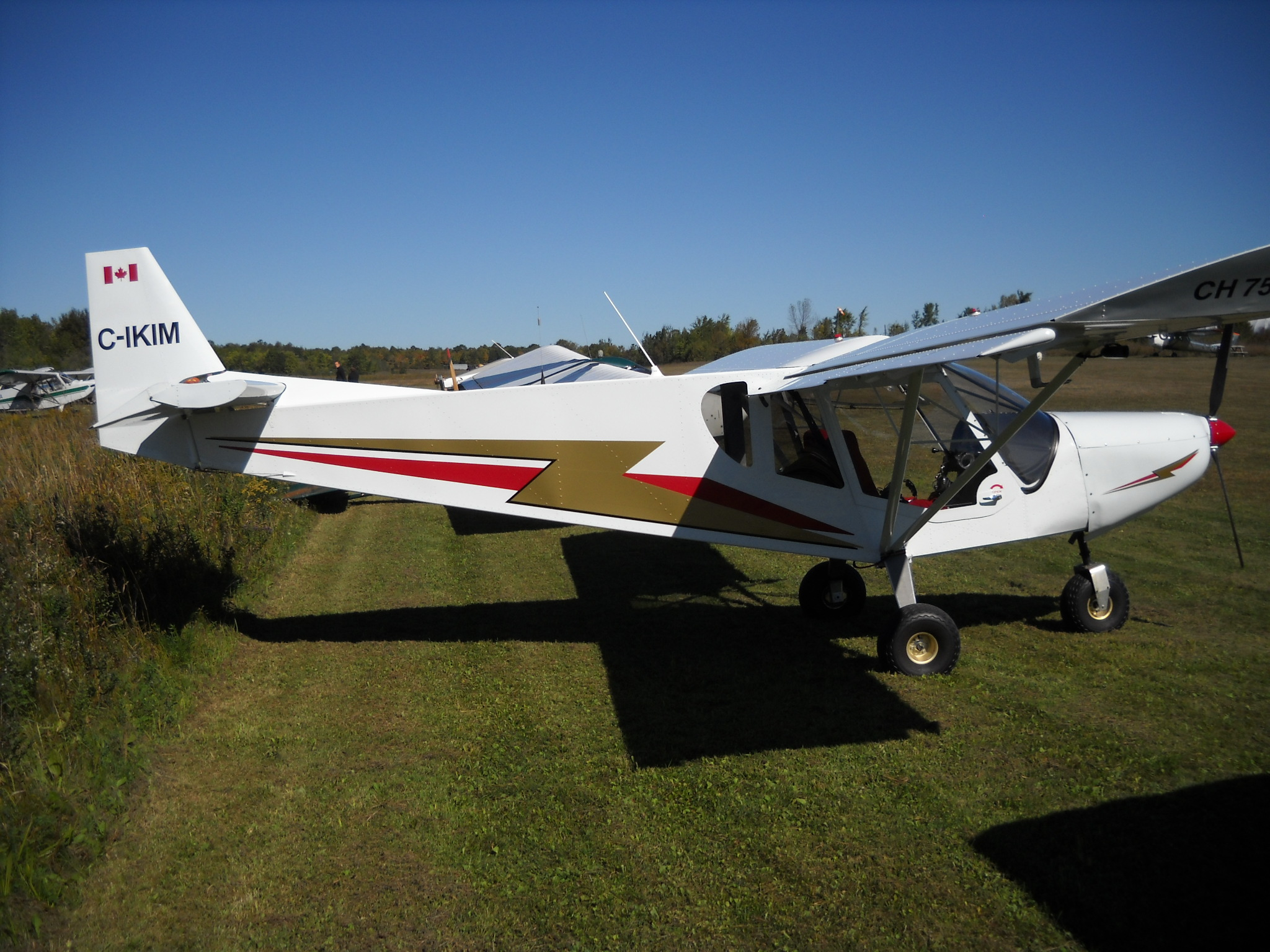
CH 750

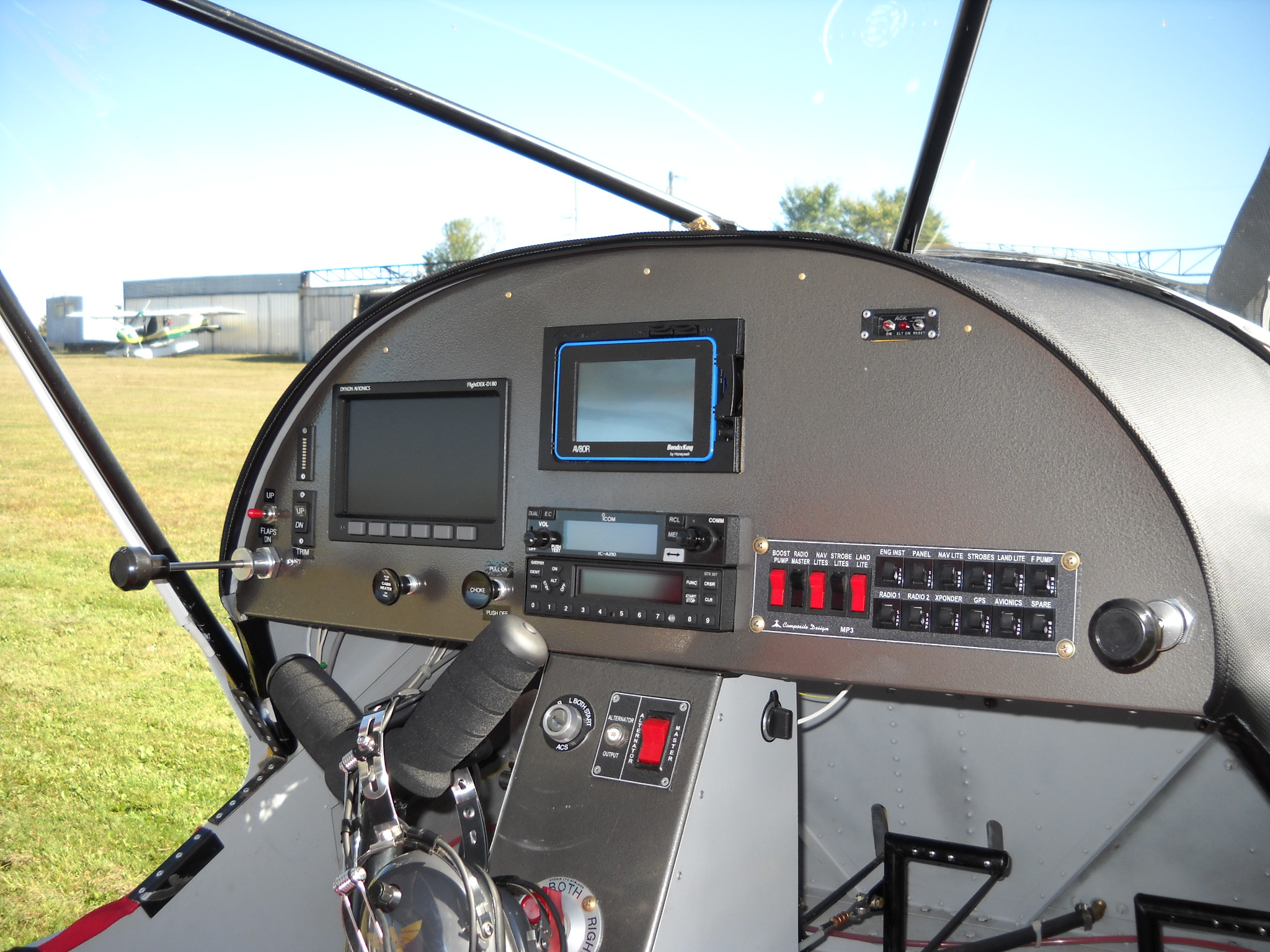
CH 750 instrument panel

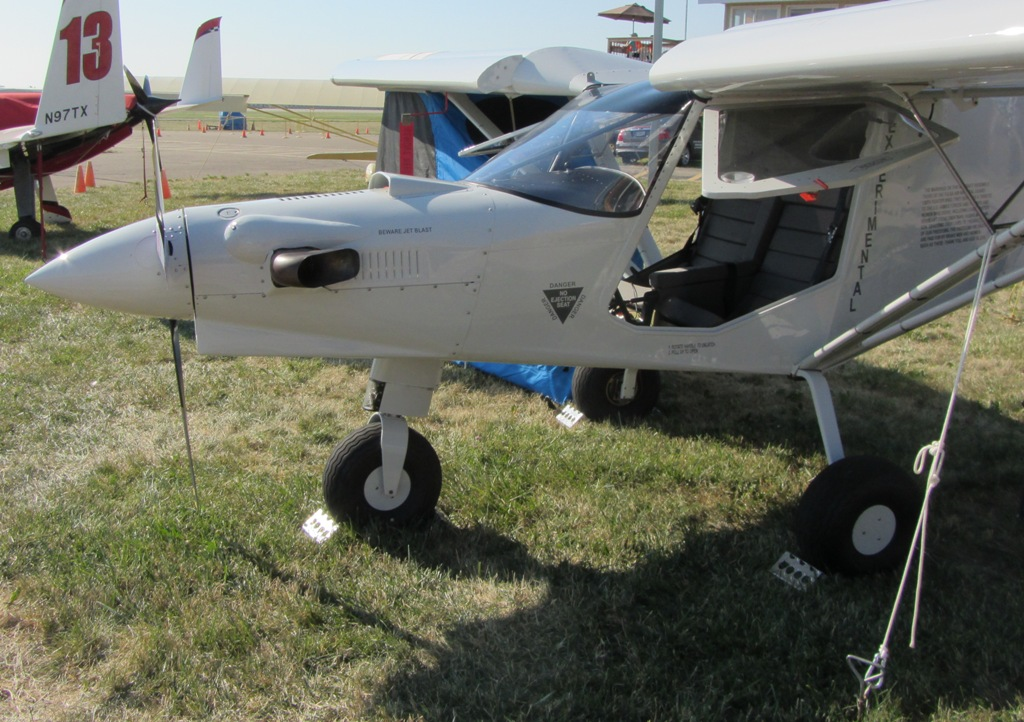
CH 701 Turboprop

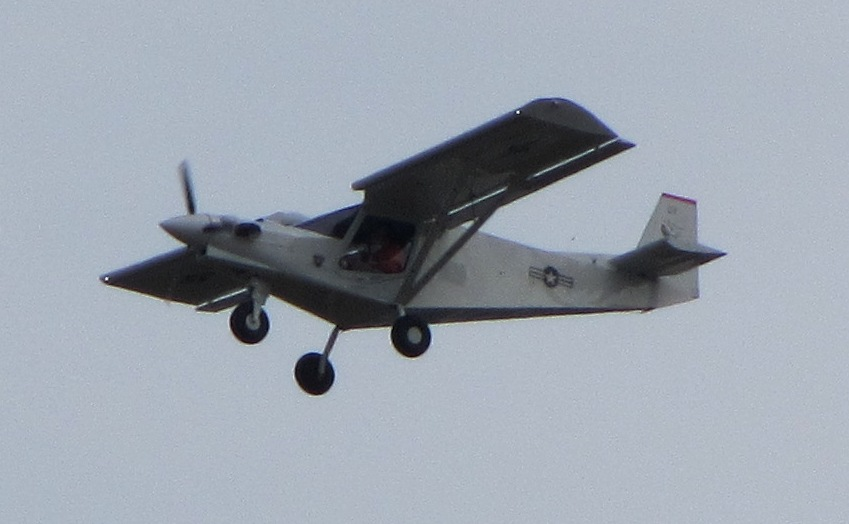
CH 701 Turboprop in flight

The Zenith STOL CH 701 and CH 750 are a family of light, two-place kit-built STOL aircraft designed by Canadian aeronautical engineer Chris Heintz through his Midland, Ontario, based company, Zenair. The CH 701 first flew in 1986 and the design is still in production. The CH 750 was first introduced in 2008. The CH 701 was later developed into the four-place Zenith STOL CH 801.

The kit is produced and distributed in the US by the Zenith Aircraft Company of Mexico, Missouri, and complete drawings, including blueprints and manuals, are also available for the design. In Europe, the CH 701 was manufactured under license by Czech Aircraft Works (CZAW) from 1992 until 2006, when the license agreement was ended.

== Design and development ==
Designed for off-runway operations, the all-metal CH 701 has many features that contribute to the aircraft's capabilities, such as a high-lift wing with full-span, non-movable leading edge slots, an all-flying rudder, large tires, flaperons and an inverted elevator. Heintz also designed a unique tricycle gear amphibious float system for the CH 701.

Standard engines used are the 64 hp (48 kW) Rotax 582 two-stroke, the 80 hp (60 kW) Rotax 912UL, the 100 hp (75 kW) Rotax 912ULS and the 85 hp (63 kW) Jabiru 2200 four-stroke powerplants. The aircraft has also been equipped with the JLT Motors Ecoyota engine, as well as popular 4 cylinder Continental engines (A-65/C-85) which Zenith still offers an engine mount for.

The STOL CH 701 has the unique distinction of being what is probably the most copied light aircraft in production today. Several dozen unauthorized versions have been produced around the world.

Designed to the Light Aircraft Manufacturers Association of Canada (LAMAC) design standard DS 10141, in its native country of Canada the CH 701 can be built and flown as a basic ultralight, advanced ultralight or amateur-built. The CH 701 can be flown under microlight or ultralight rules in several other countries also. American pilots may fly the CH 701 under Light-sport Aircraft rules or as an experimental amateur-built. The CH 750 is designed to comply with the US Light sport aircraft rules.

== Operational history ==
By the fall of 2007, 750 CH 701s had been completed and were flying. In July 2014, representatives of the company gathered volunteers of the EAA Airventure airshow to build a CH-750 kit in a one-week timeframe.

== Variants ==
STOL CH 701
Original version. 960lbs gross and 10 gal header tank. steel spring gear and Rotax 503.
STOL CH 701SP
Comes with two standard 10 U.S. gallons (38 L; 8.3 imp gal) wing tanks, solid aluminum spring gear. Smaller refinements to achieve a gross weight of 1100 lbs (500 kg).
STOL CH 750
Introduced at AirVenture 2008, the STOL CH 750 has an enlarged cabin with wider doors and is optimized for US Light Sport Aircraft rules with a maximum takeoff weight of 1320 lbs (600 kg). Builders may also opt to register it for operation on water at 1430 lbs (650 kg) while remaining within the LSA limits, or as an experimental amateur-built aircraft up to 1440 lbs (655 kg.) The STOL CH 750 was also to be factory-built by AMD as a Special Light Sport Aircraft but as of 2014 is listed by the FAA as no longer produced as an SLSA.

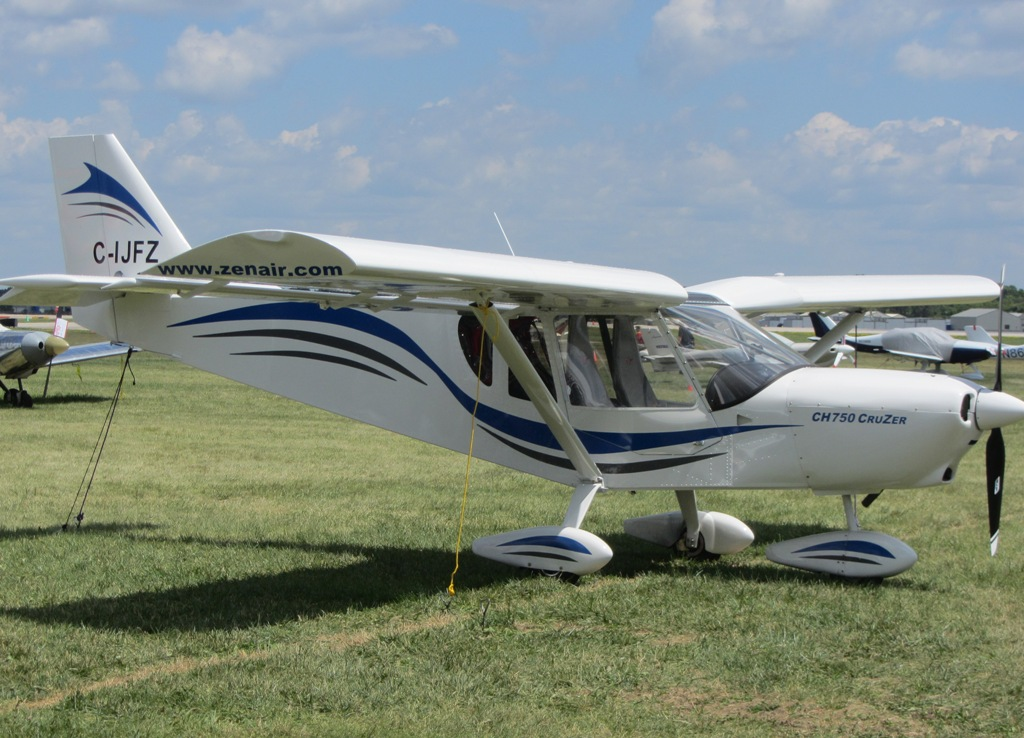
CH750 Cruzer

CH 750 Cruzer
Introduced at Sun 'n Fun 2013, the CH-750 Cruzer uses a new wing without the leading-edge slats of the STOL CH 750, and a newly designed tail with a separate vertical fin and rudder, rather than the all-flying rudder of the STOL version. The model is optimized for cross-country speed rather than STOL capabilities, although the specified 350 ft (107 m) ground roll of the Cruzer qualifies as STOL by most definitions. It mounts wheel pants as standard (although these may be removed and larger wheels installed) and the prototype is powered by a 130 hp (97 kW) ULPower UL350is fuel injected engine, although other engines in the 100–160 hp (75–119 kW) range can be used.
STOL CH750 Super Duty
This model introduced greater carrying capacity and climb capabilities. It can be powered by engines with a range of 150 to 230 hp (112 to 172 kW), with the prototype powered by a 205 hp (153 kW) Aero Sport Power IO-375 powerplant, which gave a cruise speed of 105 mph (169 km/h) and a rate of climb of 1350 fpm (6.9 m/s). Gross weight is 1,900 lb (862 kg), with a typical empty weight of 1,100 lb (499 kg).
Nuncats Sky jeep
Electric-powered derivative of CH 750, that was first flown in January 2023.

== Operators ==
India

- Indian Air Force - ordered 85 aircraft, with options for a further 48 for use by the National Cadet Corps with 25 in service by February 2001.

== Specifications (CH 701) ==
Data from Jane's All The World's Aircraft 1993-94 and Zenith Aircraft

General characteristics

- Crew: two
- Length: 20 ft 11 in (6.38 m)
- Wingspan: 27 ft 0 in (8.23 m)
- Height: 8 ft 7 in (2.62 m)
- Wing area: 122.0 sq ft (11.33 m^{2})
- Aspect ratio: 5.98:1
- Empty weight: 580 lb (263 kg)
- Max takeoff weight: 1,100 lb (499 kg)
- Fuel capacity: 20 US Gal (76 L)
- Powerplant: 1 × Rotax 912 four-cylinder liquid-cooled piston engine, 80 hp (60 kW)

Performance

- Maximum speed: 85 mph (137 km/h, 74 kn) at sea level
- Cruise speed: 80 mph (130 km/h, 70 kn)
- Stall speed: 30 mph (48 km/h, 26 kn)
- Never exceed speed: 110 mph (180 km/h, 96 kn)
- Range: 372 mi (599 km, 323 nmi) with standard fuel
- Endurance: 4.6 hours
- Service ceiling: 12,000 ft (3,657.6 m)
- g limits: +6/-3 (ultimate)
- Rate of climb: 1,000 ft/min (5.1 m/s)
- Wing loading: 9.0 lb/sq ft (44 kg/m^{2})

== See also ==
- ICP Savannah
- Tapanee Pegazair-100
- Zenith STOL CH 801
