= Arthur Simmons Stables Historic District =

Historic district in Missouri, United States

- U.S. National Register of Historic Places
- U.S. Historic district
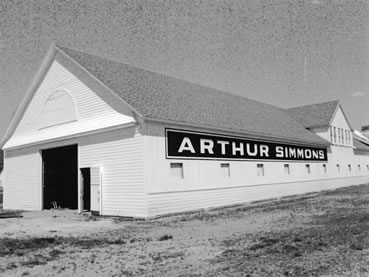
- Arthur Simmons Stables, June 2015

- Location within Missouri Location within the United States
- Location: 621 and 701 W. Blvd., Mexico, Missouri
- Coordinates: 39°09′51″N 91°53′25″W
- Area: 5.7 acres (2.3 ha)
- Built: 1887
- Architectural style: commercial horse stables
- NRHP reference No.: 04001286
- Added to NRHP: December 4, 2004

Arthur Simmons Stables Historic District, also known as the Clark & Potts Combination Sales Barn, Lee Brothers Barn, B. O. Tucker Stables, and Dincara Stables, is a historic stable complex and national historic district located at Mexico, Audrain County, Missouri. The district encompasses six contributing buildings and five contributing structures built between 1884 and 1954. They include the Arthur Simmons Stables (1887, 1943), Maternity Stables (1949), Hook Barn (c. 1935, c. 1948), Farrier's Shed (c. 1949), Storage Shed (c. 1949), Grain Bin #1 and #2 (c. 1949), East and West Tracks, Wood Fencing (c. 1945), and the Arthur Simmons House (1954). The stables were one of the most recognized training centers in the American Saddlebred industry.

It was listed on the National Register of Historic Places in 2004.
