= Tairo =

Tairo may refer to:

- Tairō, high-ranking official position in the bakuhan taisei government of Japan
- Taïro (born 1978), French singer of dancehall and reggae

== See also ==
- Tairov (disambiguation)
- Tiaro, Queensland, town and locality in the Fraser Coast Region pronounced /ˈtaɪroʊ/ TY-roh
