= Take Off TBM 12 =

TBM 12
- Type: Aircraft engine
- National origin: Germany
- Manufacturer: Take Off GmbH

The Take Off TBM 12 is an aircraft engine, designed and produced by Take Off GmbH of Hamm, Germany, for use in ultralight and homebuilt aircraft.

== Design and development ==
The TBM 12 engine is a twin-cylinder four-stroke, horizontally-opposed, 1,185 cc (72.3 cu in) displacement, air-oil-cooled, gasoline engine design, with a helical gear mechanical gearbox reduction drive with reduction ratios of 3.5:1, 2.58:1, 2.13:1 and 1.8:1. It employs electronic ignition and produces 115 hp (86 kW) at 7200 rpm, with a compression ratio of 13.1:1.

The engine is based upon a BMW motorcycle engine design.

The engine specifications carry a manufacturer's warning that the engine has not been tested, nor is certified for aircraft use, and that neither BMW nor Take Off accept any liability for aircraft use or consequential damages.

== Specifications (TBM 12) ==
Data from Tacke

=== General characteristics ===
- Type: Twin-cylinder, four-stroke aircraft engine
- Bore: 79 mm (3.1 in)
- Stroke: 59 mm (2.3 in)
- Displacement: 1,185 cc (72.3 cu in)
- Dry weight: 73 kg (160.9 lb)

=== Components ===
- Fuel type: gasoline
- Cooling system: air-oil
- Reduction gear: helical gear mechanical gearbox

=== Performance ===
- Power output: 115 hp (86 kW) at 7200 rpm

== See also ==
Related development

- Take Off TBM 11

Related lists

- List of aircraft engines
