= KJAB-FM =

- Mexico, Missouri; United States
- Frequency: 88.3 MHz
- Branding: KJAB 88.3 FM Christian Radio

Programming
- Format: Southern Gospel

Ownership
- Owner: Mexico Educational Broadcasting Foundation (Old Country Baptist Church)

Technical information
- Facility ID: 41411
- Class: A
- ERP: 4,800 watts
- HAAT: 83 meters
- Transmitter coordinates: 39°6′13″N 91°53′35″W

Links
- Webcast: listen live
- Website: kjab.com

KJAB-FM (88.3 FM) is a radio station broadcasting a Southern Gospel/Bluegrass Gospel format. Licensed to Mexico, Missouri, United States. The station is currently owned by Soul's Harbor Baptist Church dba Mexico Educational Broadcasting Foundation. KJAB is a non-commercial station broadcasting the Gospel message and informative programming.
