= Okko (disambiguation) =

Okko is a comic book series by Hub.

Okko may also refer to:

- OKKO, a network of filling complexes in Ukraine
- Okko Järvi (born 1996), Finnish basketball player
- Okko Kamu (born 1946), a Finnish conductor and violinist
- OK K.O.! Let's Be Heroes, an American superhero comedy animated series created by Ian Jones-Quartey
- Oriko "Okko" Seki, the protagonist of the novel series Okko's Inn and the anime series and film based on it

== See also ==
- Oko (disambiguation)
