= Tapanee Pegazair-100 =

Canadian homebuilt aircraft

Pegazair-100 STOL
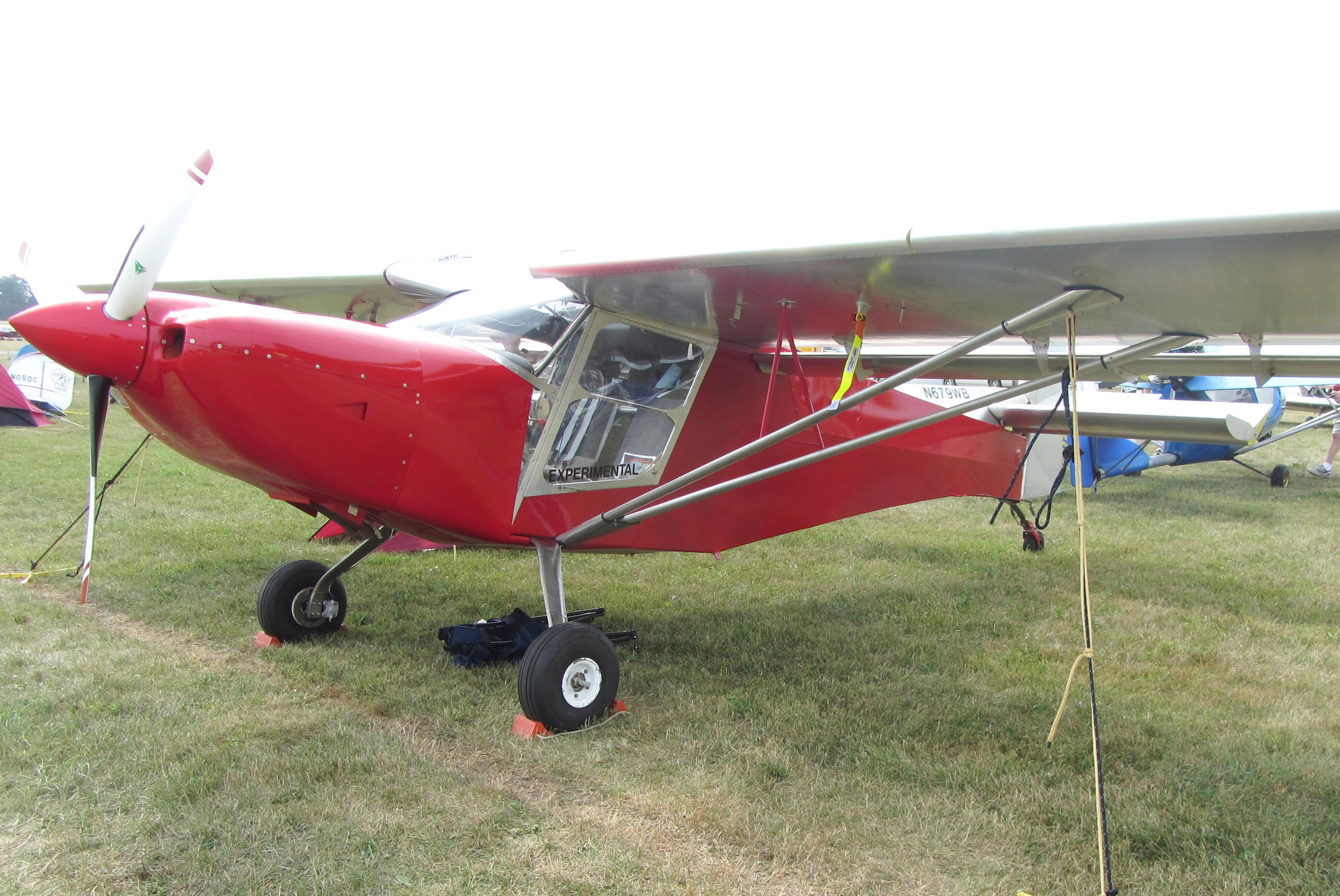

General information
- Type: Homebuilt aircraft
- National origin: Canada
- Manufacturer: Tapanee Aviation, Inc.
- Designer: Serg Dufour

History
- First flight: June 1991
- Variant: Tapanee Levitation 4

The Pegazair-100 STOL is a two-seat STOL homebuilt aircraft developed in Canada by Tapanee Aviation, Inc. of Mont-Saint-Michel, Quebec.

== Development ==
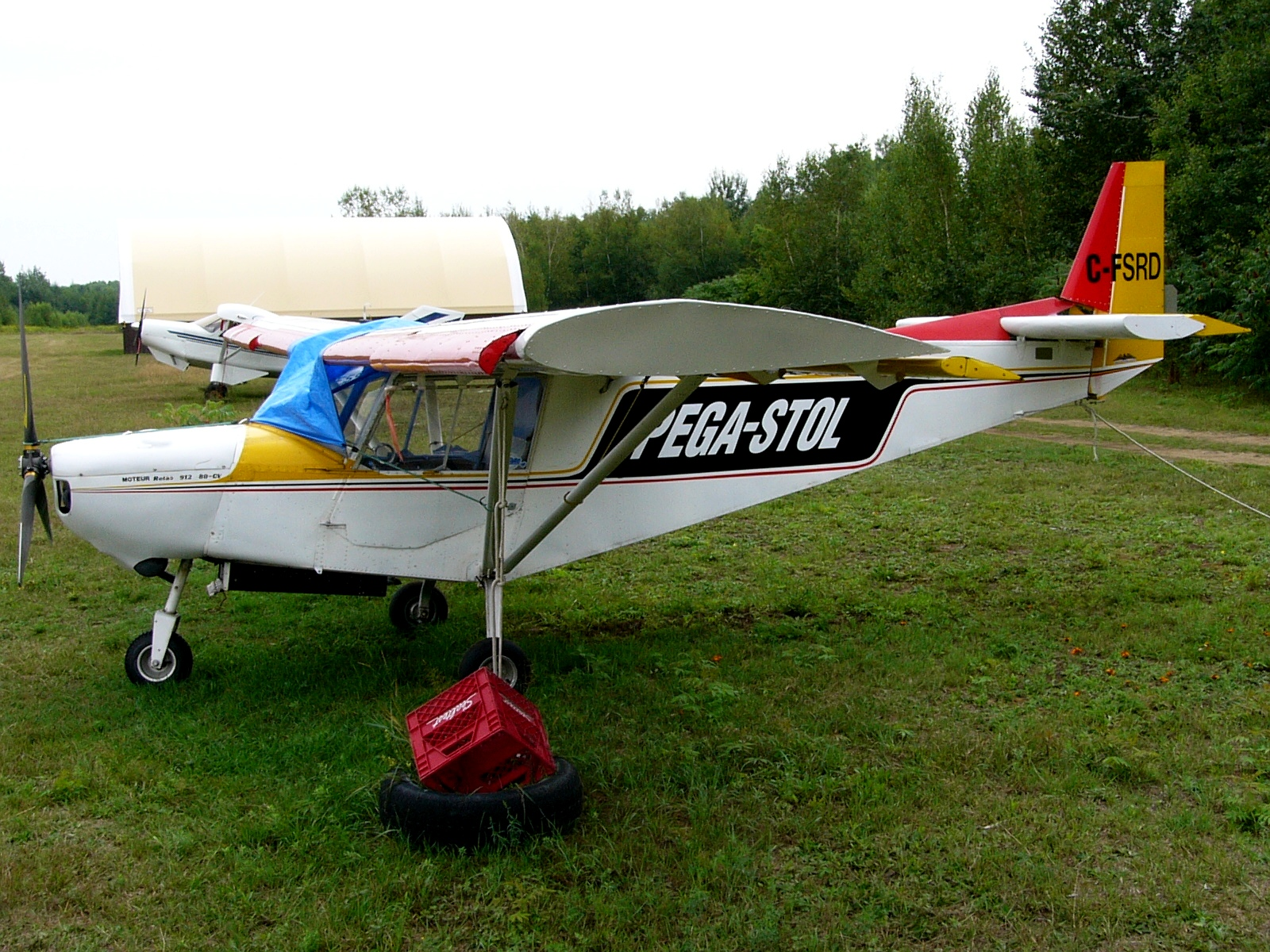
A Zenair CH 701 STOL with the original Pega-STOL wing installed

Development of the Pegazair started in 1985 by Serg Dufour of Mont-Saint-Michel, Quebec. Originally it consisted of a new set of Pega-STOL wings with retractable leading edge slats to be installed on Zenair CH 701 STOLs to replace their wings which have fixed leading edge slots. Dufour went on to develop a new fuselage and tail to match the wings. The Pegazair is a two seats in side-by-side configuration, strut-braced, high-wing monoplane with conventional landing gear. Fuselage construction is welded steel tubing with aluminum skin. The wings employ full length flaperons and leading edge slats that deploy automatically. The tailplane is slotted for slow speed authority. The prototype was outfitted with a 65 hp (48 kW) Continental A-65 engine.

The design was later developed into the four-seat Tapanee Levitation 4.

== Variants ==
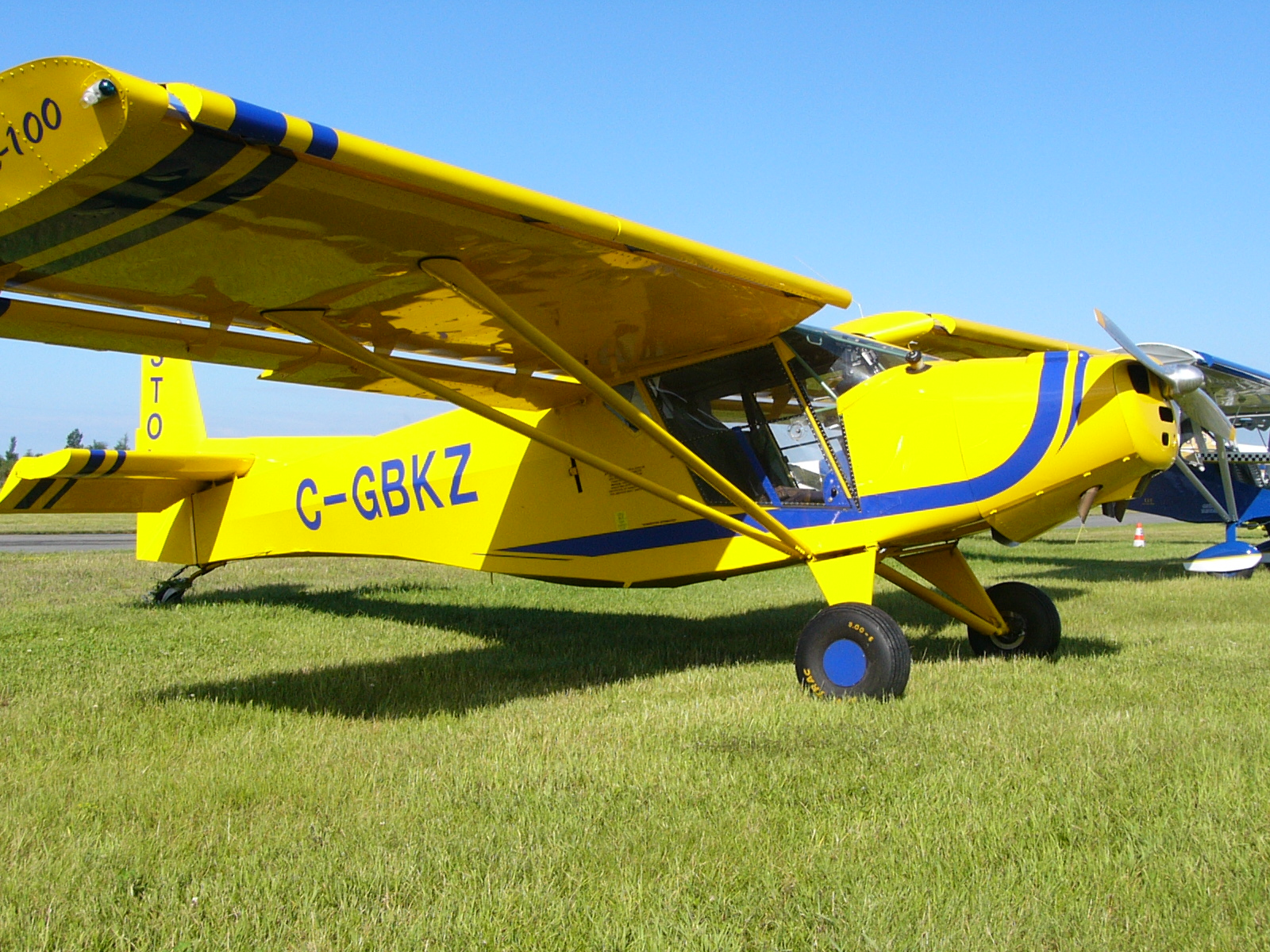
Tapanee Pegazair-100 showing the slats extended

Pegazair P80
Powered by an 80 hp (60 kW) Rotax 912UL
Pegazair P100
Powered by an 80 hp (60 kW) Continental O-200 or 115 hp (86 kW) Rotax 914

== Specifications (Pegazair-100 STOL) ==
Data from Manufacturer and Kitplanes

General characteristics

- Crew: one
- Capacity: one passenger
- Length: 6.83 m (22 ft 5 in)
- Wingspan: 8.8 m (29 ft)
- Wing area: 14 m^{2} (150 sq ft)
- Airfoil: NACA 2415
- Empty weight: 374 kg (825 lb)
- Gross weight: 658 kg (1,450 lb)
- Fuel capacity: 134 litres (29 imp gal; 35 US gal)
- Powerplant: 1 × Continental O-200 horizontally opposed piston, 75 kW (100 hp)

Performance

- Cruise speed: 169 km/h (105 mph, 91 kn)
- Stall speed: 45 km/h (28 mph, 24 kn)
- Never exceed speed: 201 km/h (125 mph, 109 kn)
- Range: 1,010 km (630 mi, 550 nmi)
- g limits: +6/-3.3
- Wing loading: 47 kg/m^{2} (9.7 lb/sq ft)

== See also ==
- Tapanee Levitation 4
