= Take Off TBM 11 =

TBM 11
- Type: Aircraft engine
- National origin: Germany
- Manufacturer: Take Off GmbH

The Take Off TBM 11 is an aircraft engine, designed and produced by Take Off GmbH of Hamm, Germany, for use in ultralight and homebuilt aircraft.

== Design and development ==
The TBM 11 engine is a twin-cylinder four-stroke, horizontally-opposed, 1,085 cc (66.2 cu in) displacement, air-oil-cooled, gasoline engine design, with a clutch and damper reduction drive with reduction ratios of 3.55:1, 3.2:1 and 2.8:1. It employs dual electronic ignition and produces 98 hp (73 kW) at 7100 rpm, with a compression ratio of 11.5.

The engine is based upon a BMW motorcycle engine design.

The engine specifications carry a manufacturer's warning that the engine has not been tested, nor is certified for aircraft use, and that neither BMW nor Take Off accept any liability for aircraft use or consequential damages.

== Specifications (TBM 11) ==
Data from Tacke

=== General characteristics ===
- Type: Twin-cylinder, four-stroke aircraft engine
- Bore: 101 mm (4.0 in)
- Stroke: 73 mm (2.9 in)
- Displacement: 1,085 cc (66.2 cu in)
- Dry weight: 74 kg (163.1 lb)

=== Components ===
- Fuel type: gasoline
- Cooling system: air-oil
- Reduction gear: clutch and damper

=== Performance ===
- Power output: 98 hp (73 kW) at 7100 rpm
- Compression ratio: 11.5:1

== See also ==
Related development

- Take Off TBM 12

Related lists

- List of aircraft engines
