= Ross House (Mexico, Missouri) =

Historic house in Missouri, United States

- U.S. National Register of Historic Places
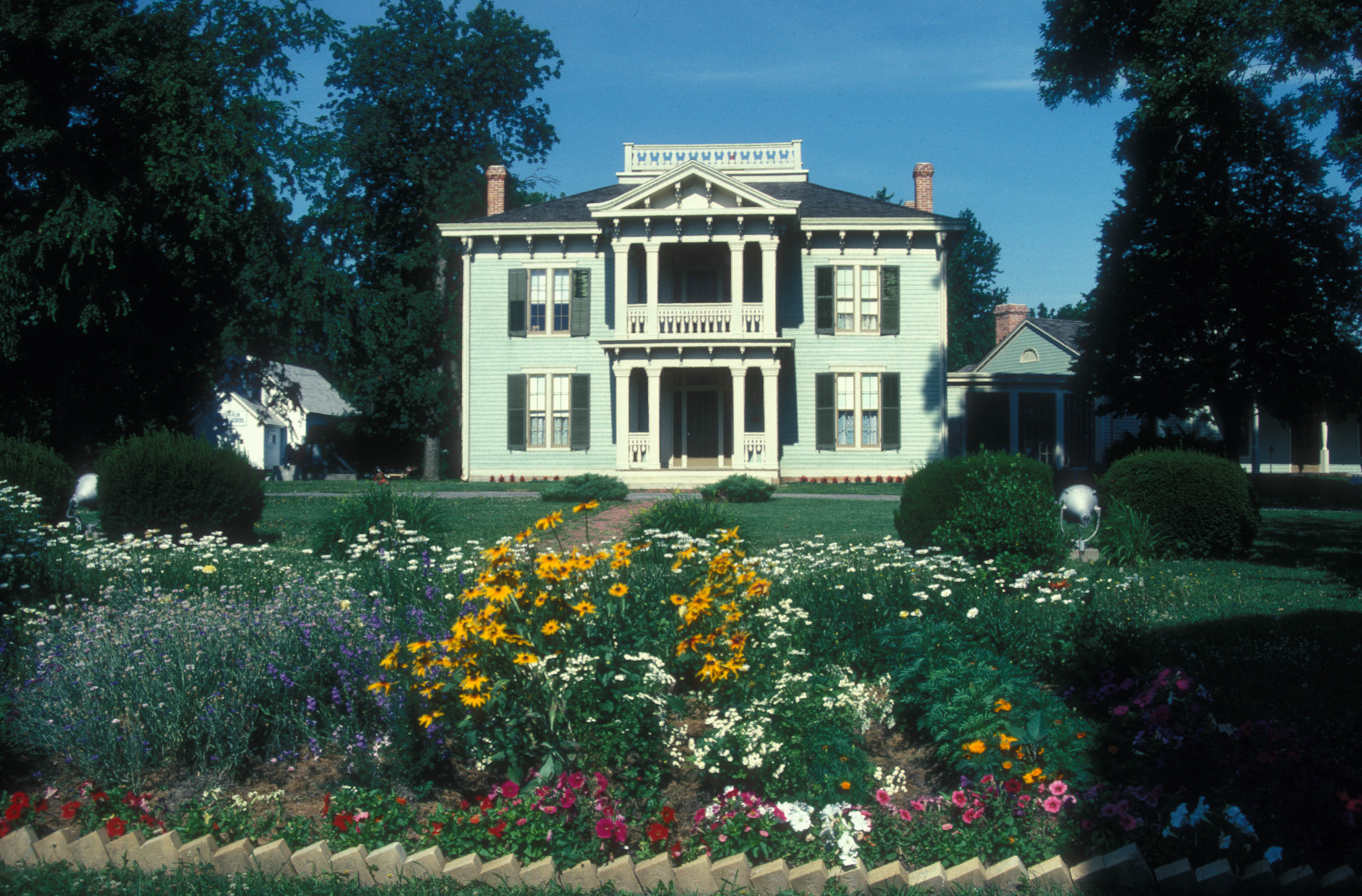
- Ross House, January 2007

- Location within Missouri Location within the United States
- Location: 501 S. Muldrow St., Mexico, Missouri
- Coordinates: 39°10′6″N 91°53′21″W
- Area: 1.2 acres (0.49 ha)
- Built: 1857
- Architectural style: Italianate, Classical Revival
- NRHP reference No.: 78001637
- Added to NRHP: July 26, 1978

Ross House, also known as John Clark House, Graceland Museum, and Audrain County Historical Museum, is a historic home located at Mexico, Audrain County, Missouri. It was built in 1857, and is a two-story, frame dwelling with Italianate style decorative features. The house is topped by a hipped roof with widow's walk. It features an imposing Classical Revival style two-story front portico. The house is operated by the Audrain County Historical Society and adjacent to the American Saddlebred Horse Museum.

It was listed on the National Register of Historic Places in 1978.
