= Tapanee Levitation 4 =

Levitation 4

General information
- Type: Four-seat homebuilt STOL aircraft
- National origin: Canada
- Manufacturer: Tapanee Aviation
- Designer: Michel Lequin
- Number built: 3 (Dec 2011)

History
- First flight: 2002
- Developed from: Tapanee Pegazair-100
- Variant: Tapanee Levitation 2

The Tapanee Levitation 4 is a Canadian four-seat STOL aircraft designed to be homebuilt by Michel Lequin for Tapanee Aviation of Mont-Saint-Michel, Quebec.

== Design and development ==
A larger version of the companies earlier Pegazair bushplane, the Levitation is a high-wing monoplane with V-strut bracing, leading edge slats and Junkers flaperons. Powered by a 180 hp (134 kW) Lycoming O-360 flat-six piston engine with a two-blade propeller. The Levitation has a fixed conventional landing gear with a tailwheel and a cabin holding a pilot and three passengers in two rows of side-by-side seating. By December 2004 five kits had been sold.

== Specifications ==
Data from Jane's All the World's Aircraft 2008-2009

General characteristics

- Crew: 1
- Capacity: 3
- Length: 7.47 m (24 ft 6 in)
- Wingspan: 10.21 m (33 ft 6 in)
- Height: 2.44 m (8 ft 0 in)
- Wing area: 16.72 m^{2} (180 sq ft)
- Empty weight: 621 kg (1,368 lb)
- Gross weight: 1,133 kg (2,500 lb)
- Powerplant: 1 × Lycoming O-360 flat-four piston engine , 134 kW (180 hp)

Performance

- Maximum speed: 255 km/h (159 mph, 138 kn)
- Cruise speed: 185 km/h (115 mph, 100 kn)
- Stall speed: 62 km/h (38 mph, 33 kn)
- Range: 925 km (575 mi, 500 nmi)
- Rate of climb: 3.6 m/s (700 ft/min)

== See also ==
Related development

- Tapanee Pegazair-100
