= Take Off Merlin =

German ultralight trike

Merlin

General information
- Type: Ultralight trike
- National origin: Germany
- Manufacturer: Take Off GmbH
- Status: In production (2018)

History
- Manufactured: 1994-present
- Introduction date: 1994

The Take Off Merlin is a German ultralight trike, designed and produced by Take Off GmbH of Hamm. The aircraft is supplied as a complete ready-to-fly-aircraft.

== Design and development ==
The Merlin was designed to comply with the Fédération Aéronautique Internationale microlight category, including the category's maximum gross weight of 450 kg (992 lb). The aircraft features a cable-braced hang glider-style high-wing, weight-shift controls, a two-seats-in-tandem open cockpit with a cockpit fairing, tricycle landing gear with wheel pants and a single engine in pusher configuration.

The aircraft is made from welded stainless steel tubing, with its double surface wing covered in Dacron sailcloth. Its 10 m (32.8 ft) span wing is supported by a single tube-type kingpost and uses an "A" frame weight-shift control bar. The powerplants are various BMW motorcycle engines that vary by model.

A number of different wings can be fitted to the basic carriage, including the Drachen Studio Avent and Air Creation iXess .

== Variants ==
Merlin 100
Initial version introduced in 1994
Merlin 1100
Model introduced in 1998 and powered by a four-stroke, 90 hp (67 kW) BMW 1100 RS engine. The 1100 has an empty weight of 195 kg (430 lb) and a gross weight of 400 kg (882 lb), giving a useful load of 205 kg (452 lb). With full fuel of 60 litres (13 imp gal; 16 US gal) the payload is 162 kg (357 lb).
Merlin 1200
Model introduced in 2006 and powered by a four-stroke, 95 hp (71 kW) BMW 1200 GS engine. The 1200 has an empty weight of 230 kg (507 lb) and a gross weight of 450 kg (992 lb), giving a useful load of 220 kg (485 lb). With full fuel of 60 litres (13 imp gal; 16 US gal) the payload is 177 kg (390 lb).

== Specifications (Merlin 1200) ==
Data from Bayerl

General characteristics

- Crew: one
- Capacity: one passenger
- Wingspan: 10.0 m (32 ft 10 in)
- Wing area: 15.2 m^{2} (164 sq ft)
- Empty weight: 230 kg (507 lb)
- Fuel capacity: 60 litres (13 imp gal; 16 US gal)
- Powerplant: 1 × BMW 1200 GS four stroke motorcycle engine, 71 kW (95 hp)
- Propellers: 3-bladed composite

Performance

- Maximum speed: 140 km/h (87 mph, 76 kn)
- Cruise speed: 120 km/h (75 mph, 65 kn)
- Stall speed: 55 km/h (34 mph, 30 kn)
- Rate of climb: 5 m/s (980 ft/min)
- Wing loading: 29.6 kg/m^{2} (6.1 lb/sq ft)
