= Taiwan Dancer TD-3 =

Taiwanese amateur-built aircraft

TD-3

General information
- Type: Amateur-built aircraft
- National origin: Taiwan
- Manufacturer: Taiwan Dancer Technology Co.
- Designer: Chin Lien Wei
- Status: Production completed (2017)

History
- Introduction date: 2007

The Taiwan Dancer TD-3 is a Taiwanese amateur-built aircraft produced by Taiwan Dancer Technology Co. of Nangang Village, Dayuan District, Taoyuan City. Designed by Chin Lien Wei, the aircraft is supplied as a kit for amateur construction.

By May 2017 the company website had been taken down and the company may have ceased operations.

== Design and development ==
The aircraft features a strut-braced high-wing, a two-seats-in-side-by-side configuration enclosed cockpit with doors for access, fixed tricycle landing gear or conventional landing gear and a single engine in tractor configuration.

The aircraft fuselage is made from welded steel tubing while the wing is made from aluminum sheet parts, with all surfaces covered in formed epoxy polymer. Its 8.62 m (28.3 ft) span wing is supported by "V" struts, employs a NASA-HQ3.0 airfoil, has an area of 11.16 m^{2} (120.1 sq ft) and mounts flaperons. The wings can be folded in 15 minutes for ground transportation or storage. The recommended power range is 65 to 110 hp (48 to 82 kW) and the standard engines used are the 97 hp (72 kW) geared Volkswagen air-cooled engine and the 100 hp (75 kW) Rotax 912ULS four-stroke powerplants.

The TD-3 was completed in 2007 and won first prize for an aircraft design, awarded by the Taiwanese Ministry of Economic Affairs.

== Specifications (TD-3) ==
Data from Bayerl and Taiwan Dancer

General characteristics

- Crew: one
- Capacity: one passenger
- Length: 7.2 m (23.5 ft)
- Wingspan: 8.62 m (28 ft 3 in)
- Height: 2.3 m (7.7 ft)
- Wing area: 11.16 m^{2} (120.1 sq ft)
- Airfoil: NASA-HQ3.0
- Empty weight: 272 kg (600 lb)
- Gross weight: 499 kg (1,100 lb)
- Fuel capacity: 60 litres (13 imp gal; 16 US gal)
- Powerplant: 1 × Volkswagen air-cooled engine four cylinder, air-cooled, four stroke geared automotive conversion, 72 kW (97 hp)
- Propellers: 2-bladed wooden

Performance

- Maximum speed: 193 km/h (120 mph, 104 kn)
- Cruise speed: 150 km/h (93 mph, 81 kn)
- Stall speed: 45 km/h (28 mph, 24 kn)
- Range: 400 km (250 mi, 220 nmi)
- Service ceiling: 3,700 m (12,000 ft)
- Rate of climb: 4.6 m/s (900 ft/min)
- Wing loading: 44.6 kg/m^{2} (9.1 lb/sq ft)
