= Tachikawa KKY =

Japanese ambulance aircraft

General information
- Type: Ambulance aircraft
- National origin: Japan
- Manufacturer: Tachikawa Aircraft Company
- Designer: Ryokichi Endo
- Primary user: Japanese Army
- Number built: 25

History
- Manufactured: 4-5 years
- First flight: December 1933 or later

The Tachikawa KKY, full name Tachikawa Army Small and Light Ambulance Aircraft, was designed to rescue injured or sick patients from places without established airfields. Following two earlier prototypes, twenty-one production examples were built between 1936 and 1940 and served in the Second Sino-Japanese War.

== Design and development ==
In August 1932, the Japanese Army placed an order for a small ambulance aircraft, capable of using rough airstrips and holding two stretcher cases and a medical attendant, with what was then the Aeroplane Factory of Ishikawajima Shipbuilding Company. Though the prototype was completed in December 1933, its development was protracted, and it was not ready for production until 1936. By then, the Ishikawajima Company had become the Tachikawa Aeroplane Co.

It was a single bay cabin biplane with wings attached to the upper and lower longerons and braced on each side with near-parallel interplane struts. The wings had wooden structures and were fabric-covered.

The KKY was powered by a 120–130 hp (89–97 kW) Cirrus Hermes IV four cylinder air-cooled, inverted inline engine and the later KKY-2 by a 150 hp (110 kW) Gasuden Jimpu seven cylinder radial engine. The fuselage had a welded steel tube structure, flat-sided behind the engine, with a windowed cabin that included the pilot's seat just ahead of the wing leading edge with the patients and attendant under the wing. The tail, with an aluminium structure and fabric-covered, was conventional with a tailplane on top of the fuselage and braced to it from below. The vertical tail had a strongly-blunted triangular profile.

As its purpose was to rescue patients from rough airfields or unmade airstrips, the ambulance needed a robust undercarriage. This had split axles mounted on a short, central, V-strut from the fuselage underside. Both short, faired shock absorber legs and their rearward drag struts were mounted on the lower fuselage longerons. Wheels with wide, low-pressure tires were available for missions to unmade strips.

== Operational history ==
Twenty-one Aikoku-go (privately funded) production KKYs were built between 1936 and 1940. They were active in the Second Sino-Japanese War, which began in 1937 and became part of World War II, when China entered on the Allies' side shortly after the attack on Pearl Harbor.

== Variants ==
KKY
As described. Two prototypes plus production aircraft from 1936 to October 1938.
KKY-2
The production aircraft from October 1938, powered by a 150 hp (110 kW) Gasuden Jimpu seven cylinder radial engine driving a wooden propeller. It had increased area wings with Clark Y airfoils, braced with N-type interplane struts.
KS Small Survey Aircraft
A modification of the KKY-2 into a civil photographic survey aircraft for the Department of Railways. It had additional large windows in the cabin sides behind the wing trailing edge and another in the cabin floor, a survey camera and seats for a survey crew of three. Two were built in 1939.

== Specifications (KKY) ==
Data from Japanese Aircraft 1910-1941.

General characteristics

- Crew: one pilot
- Capacity: one medical attendant and two stretcher patients
- Length: 7.9 m (25 ft 11 in)
- Wingspan: 10 m (32 ft 10 in)
- Height: 2.38 m (7 ft 10 in)
- Wing area: 22 m^{2} (240 sq ft)
- Empty weight: 560 kg (1,235 lb)
- Gross weight: 977 kg (2,154 lb)
- Powerplant: 1 × Cirrus Hermes IV air-cooled four cylinder inverted inline, 89–97 kW (120–130 hp)
- Propellers: 2-bladed fixed pitch, metal

Performance

- Maximum speed: 182 km/h (113 mph, 98 kn)
- Cruise speed: 156 km/h (97 mph, 84 kn)
- Landing speed: 80 km/h (50 mph; 43 kn)
- Take-of and landing distances approximately: 250 m (820 ft)
- Range: 620 km (390 mi, 330 nmi)
- Service ceiling: 4,500 m (14,800 ft)
- Time to altitude: 14 min to 2,000 m (6,600 ft)
