= Tunisian UAVs =

Nasnas MK1
- Nasnas MK1

General information
- Type: UAV
- Manufacturer: Tunisia Aero Technologies Industries (TATI)
- Designer: Azouz Bachouche, Patent Holder and Founder/President at (TATI)
- Status: Inactive
- Primary user: Tunisia
- Number built: no-data

History
- Manufactured: no-data
- Introduction date: 1997
- First flight: August 1998
- Developed from: Tunisia Aero Technologies Industries (TATI S.A.)
- Developed into: Super Nasnas

== Short range UAV demonstrator Nasnas ==
The TAT Nasnas is an unmanned aerial vehicle (UAV). Tunisia was the first Arab country to develop this industry in 1997. In 2003, it was joined by the United Arab Emirates. The UAVs are constructed and designed in Tunisia. They are produced by the Tunisia Aero Technologies company (TAT). The flight of the first Tunisian drone, "TAT Aoussou", took place in October 1997. It served primarily as an aerial target for anti-aircraft units. It was designed and built in eight months. The first flight of the prototype "TAT Nasnas" (or "anasnas") took place in August 1998. It was designed and built in six months.

Data from Jane's:

=== Dimensions ===
- Length 2.80m
- Height 1.20m
- Wingspan 3.80m, hollow wing type ton hoste extra fuel bladder tanks
- Diameter: rectangular fuselage pod
- Twin boom configuration.
- Weight dry: 43 kg

Maximum takeoff weight 120 kg Power Plant: Twin opposed cylinders engine, 22 hp to 38 hp.

- Launch conventional wheeled or catapult
- Recovery conventional wheeled or parachute
- Payload: day & night electro optic stabilized payload. Other scientific payloads upon client requirement.

Use: TADA, Surveillance, Intelligence, pipeline surveillance, meteo, remote sensing for mapping.

=== Performance ===
- Speed 70kt
- Autonomy > 11hr
- Ceiling 5.000m
- Mission Radius: 200 km LOS.

=== Datalinks ===
- Datalink: LOS datalink
- Guidance:telemetry command via autopilot and GPS (production version)
- System: Not Available
- Fuel: Not Available

=== Payloads ===
- FLIR or TV camera. Scientific instrumentation
- 25 kg *.

== TAT Jebelassa 650 ==
The Jebelassa 650 (means in Arabic: Mountain Watch) has evolved subsequently to give birth to a new version of the Smaller Nasnas which is "stronger and more polished".

- wingspan: 6m50
- area of 3.80 m2 wing
- length 3m80
- height 1.30m
- weight, 158 kg dry, maximum takeoff weight 270 kg
- payload of 55 30 kg
- cruising speed 170 km / h, Loiter Speed: 120 km/h
- altitude of 5,200 m.
- 24h autonomy flight
- engine: 38 hp diesel/jet A1/injection modified engine.*Mission Radius: 200 km. Can be extended to 800 km when using Radio Relays.

The first flight of the prototype Jebelassa took place in 2004. It has a larger radius of action the UAV can carry more payloads and missions.

== Fixed Wing HALE UAV: Buraq ==
=== Specifications ===
Data from

- Very long endurance surveillance (up to 60 hours) with capability to carry heavy loads.
- Missions: Meteorology, Mapping, Reconnaissance.
- Military/Civil Heavy Loads:
- Complex sensors (e.g. RAPTOR pod);
- Weapons: anti-tank, anti-ship, anti-bunker missiles, etc.
- Possibility to deploy military/emergency supplies in hostile territory or in case of natural disasters.
- Possibility to deploy anti-mine devices.
- Possibility to carry large meteorogical-sensors.
- Possibility to deploy fire/pollution retardants in case of disasters.
- Possibility to deploy life-boats in case of maritime disasters.

== Rotary Wing UAV: Jinn (Project) ==
Tunisia Aero Technologies Industries is looking for investors to develop the TATI Jinn
