= Taylorcraft Ranch Wagon =

1950s high-wing four-seat aircraft

Model 20 Ranch Wagon

General information
- Type: Four-seat cabin monoplane
- National origin: United States
- Manufacturer: Taylorcraft
- Number built: 38

History
- First flight: 1955

The Taylorcraft Model 20 Ranch Wagon was a four-seat cabin monoplane designed and built by Taylorcraft Aircraft as a development of the earlier experimental Model 18. The Model 20 was constructed of moulded fibreglass over a tubular framework. It had a conventional landing gear and a nose-mounted 225 hp (168 kW) Continental O-470-J engine.

== Variants ==
Model 20 Ranch Wagon
Utility model powered by a 225hp (168kW) Continental O-470-J engine.
Model 20 Zephyr 400
Tourer variant of 1958 with detailed changes from the basic Model 20.
Model 20AG Topper
Agricultural variant. Chemical hopper or tank in rear of cabin.
Model 20 Seabird
Floatplane variant.

== Specifications (Ranch Wagon) ==
Data from Jane's All The World's Aircraft 1955–56

General characteristics

- Crew: one
- Capacity: three passengers
- Length: 24 ft 4 in (7.42 m)
- Wingspan: 34 ft 8 in (10.57 m)
- Height: 7 ft 2 in (2.18 m)
- Wing area: 175.5 sq ft (16.30 m^{2})
- Aspect ratio: 7.11:1
- Airfoil: Goëttingen 532
- Empty weight: 1,625 lb (737 kg)
- Gross weight: 2,750 lb (1,247 kg)
- Fuel capacity: 66 US gal (55 imp gal; 250 L)
- Powerplant: 1 × Continental O-470-J air-cooled six-cylinder horizontally-opposed engine, 225 hp (168 kW)

Performance

- Maximum speed: 160 mph (260 km/h, 140 kn)
- Cruise speed: 150 mph (240 km/h, 130 kn)
- Endurance: 5 hours
- Service ceiling: 15,000 ft (4,600 m)
- Rate of climb: 1,000 ft/min (5.1 m/s)
