= Take Off GmbH =

German ultralight aircraft manufacturer

- Type: Privately held company
- Industry: Aerospace
- Founded: mid-1970s
- Headquarters: Hamm, Germany
- Products: Ultralight aircraft, aircraft engines
- Website: www.takeoff-ul.de

Take Off Ultraleichtflug GmbH (English: Take Off Ultralight Aircraft Limited), not to confuse with Take Off GmbH (Black Forest), is a German aircraft manufacturer based in Hamm. The company specializes in the design and manufacture of ultralight aircraft in the form of ready-to-fly aircraft. It also builds aircraft engines, based upon BMW motorcycle engines.

The Minimum is a powered hang glider design that was introduced in 1979. This was followed by the Maximum, an ultralight trike, in 1989. The Merlin series of trikes was introduced in 1994.

The company also builds aircraft engines based upon BMW motorcycle engines, including the 98 hp (73 kW) TBM 11 and the 115 hp (86 kW) TBM 12.

The company also builds ground effect vehicles, airboats and propeller-driven snowmobiles.

== Aircraft ==
Summary of aircraft built by Take Off:

- Take Off Minimum
- Take Off Maximum
- Take Off Merlin
