= Takasou TN-6 =

General information
- Type: single seat biplane
- National origin: Japan
- Manufacturer: (and designer) Takayuki Takasou
- Number built: 1

History
- First flight: late 1917

The Takasou TN-6 was a Japanese single seat biplane, much modified through its relatively long career as a trainer. Its last rebuild brought it an extra seat and a change of name to Yasui TN-6 Kai.

== Design and development ==
The TN-6 was a wooden-framed, fabric-covered, two bay, unequal span biplane. Its wings were braced without stagger by pairs of parallel interplane struts. The ailerons were on the outer part of the longer span upper wings.

Its fuselage was flat-sided with the nose metal-covered around the lower half of its 65 hp (48 kW) Hall-Scott water-cooled V-8 engine. This had a car style front-mounted radiator behind a two-bladed propeller. The TN-6 was flown from an open cockpit under the upper trailing edge. Its fixed landing gear was conventional, with mainwheels on a single axle.

The TN-6 was completed in the autumn of 1917. It was used briefly as a trainer in Osaka but was soon damaged in an accident. After repair it was sold in August 1918 to Soujiro Yasui, who learned to fly it under Takasou's instruction. It suffered a series of accidents, each leading to modifications. After several such improvements the aircraft was sufficiently changed that Yasui renamed it the Yasui TN-6 Kai or Yasui TN-6-modified.

The wings of the Yasui TN-6 Kai were new. Though still of rectangular plan, both upper and lower wings had the same, 11.50 m (37 ft 9 in) longer span and both carried ailerons. The main interplane struts were unchanged but the central upper wing was held high over the fuselage with parallel pairs of cabane struts from the upper longerons. Its upper engine cowling was completed with further aluminium sheet and its utility as a trainer enhanced by the addition of a second seat in an elongated cockpit. A small cut-out in the upper trailing edge improved the pilot's field of view. It also had a redesigned fin, though details are lacking. Together these changes increased the length to 9.50 m (31 ft 2 in).

== Operational history ==
It is not known exactly when the final modifications were completed and the aircraft renamed but Yasui flew it on 3 January 1920 in an important New Year celebration flight over Kyoto, his home city. The following New Year he joined a similar flight over Osaka. It was used along with his next aircraft, the Yasui No.3, to train several new pilots. In its various forms the TH-6 and its Hall-Scott engine, flown from 1917 to at least 1921, had a long working life by contemporary standards.

== Specifications (Takasou TN-6) ==
Data from Japanese Aircraft 1910-1941

General characteristics

- Crew: one
- Length: 7.90 m (25 ft 11 in)
- Wingspan: 11.20 m (36 ft 9 in)
- Wing area: 28.5 m^{2} (307 sq ft)
- Empty weight: 610 kg (1,345 lb)
- Powerplant: 1 × Hall-Scott water-cooled V-8, 48 kW (65 hp)
- Propellers: 2-bladed wooden

Performance

- Maximum speed: 98 km/h (61 mph, 53 kn)
