= Mexico Memorial Airport =

Airport in Missouri, United States

- IATA: none; ICAO: KMYJ; FAA LID: MYJ

Summary
- Airport type: Public
- Owner: City of Mexico
- Serves: Mexico, Missouri
- Elevation AMSL: 823 ft / 251 m
- Coordinates: 39°09′27″N 091°49′06″W

Map

Runways
Direction	Length		Surface
Direction	ft	m	Surface
6/24	5,501	1,677	Concrete
18/36	3,199	975	Asphalt/Concrete

Statistics (2010)
- Aircraft operations: 12,200
- Based aircraft: 35
- Source: Federal Aviation Administration

Mexico Memorial Airport (ICAO: KMYJ, FAA LID: MYJ) is a city-owned public-use airport located three nautical miles (6 km) east of the central business district of Mexico, a city in Audrain County, Missouri, United States. This airport is included in the FAA's National Plan of Integrated Airport Systems for 2009–2013, which categorized it as a general aviation facility.

Although many U.S. airports use the same three-letter location identifier for the FAA and IATA, this facility is assigned MYJ by the FAA but has no designation from the IATA (which assigned MYJ to Matsuyama Airport in Japan).

== Facilities and aircraft ==
Mexico Memorial Airport covers an area of 290 acres (120 ha) at an elevation of 823 feet (251 m) above mean sea level. It has two runways: 6/24 is 5,501 by 100 feet (1,677 x 30 m) with a concrete surface and 18/36 is 3,199 by 50 feet (975 x 15 m) with an asphalt and concrete surface.

For the 12-month period ending March 31, 2010, the airport had 12,200 aircraft operations, an average of 33 per day: 89% general aviation, 11% air taxi, and <1% military. At that time there were 35 aircraft based at this airport: 80% single-engine, 17% multi-engine, and 3% helicopter.

Zenith Aircraft Company designs, develops and manufactures kit aircraft. The company was founded in 1992 and is located at the airport. In 2017 the company celebrated its 25th anniversary.

== See also ==
- List of airports in Missouri
