= Taiwan Dancer =

Taiwanese aircraft manufacturer

Taiwan Dancer Technology Co., Ltd.
- Type: Privately held company
- Industry: Aerospace
- Founded: 2002
- Headquarters: Nangang Village, Dayuan, Taoyuan City, Taiwan
- Key people: President: Chin Lien Wei
- Products: Kit aircraft
- Number of employees: 7
- Website: tdaircraft.myweb.hinet.net/index.html

Taiwan Dancer Technology Co., Ltd. was a Taiwanese aircraft manufacturer based in Nangang Village, Dayuan District, Taoyuan City. The company president was Chin Lien Wei. The company specialized in the design and manufacture of ultralight aircraft in the form of kits for amateur construction.

The first aircraft design, the TD-1 was started in 1996 and was completed in 1999. The company was founded in 2002 and the TD-2 was completed the same year. The third design, the Taiwan Dancer TD-3, was completed in 2007 and won first prize for an aircraft design, awarded by the Taiwanese Ministry of Economic Affairs.

== Aircraft ==
Summary of aircraft built by Taiwan Dancer
Model name	First flight	Number built	Type
Taiwan Dancer TD-1	1999		Two seat ultralight aircraft
Taiwan Dancer TD-2	2002		Two seat ultralight aircraft
Taiwan Dancer TD-3	2007		Two seat ultralight aircraft
