= Mexico, Missouri =

City in Missouri, U.S.

- City
- Downtown Mexico Audrain County Courthouse Mexico-Audrain County Library

- Logo
- Nickname: Main Street of the Midwest
- Location in Audrain County in the State of Missouri
- Coordinates: 39°09′45″N 91°52′40″W
- Country: United States
- State: Missouri
- County: Audrain
- Incorporated: March 5, 1855
- Named for: Nuevo México (English: New Mexico)

Government
  - Type: Council–Manager
  - Mayor: Chris Mills
  - Manager: Bruce Slagle
  - Council: Members: Vicki Briggs; Chris Williams – Council President Pro-Tem; Steve Nichols; Dr. Ayanna Shivers

Area
  - Total: 12.50 sq mi (32.38 km^{2})
  - Land: 12.14 sq mi (31.43 km^{2})
  - Water: 0.37 sq mi (0.95 km^{2})
- Elevation: 761 ft (232 m)

Population (2020)
  - Total: 11,469
  - Density: 945.2/sq mi (364.96/km^{2})
- Time zone: UTC-6 (CST)
  - Summer (DST): UTC-5 (CDT)
- ZIP code: 65265
- Area code: 573
- FIPS code: 29-47648
- GNIS feature ID: 2395107
- Major airport: Mexico Memorial Airport
- Website: mexicomissouri.net

Mexico, formerly known as New Mexico, is a city in and the county seat of Audrain County, Missouri, United States. It is home to the Missouri Military Academy and annually hosts the Miss Missouri Pageant. The city's population was 11,469 at the 2020 census. The micropolitan statistical area consists of Audrain County. It is a part of the Columbia, Missouri metropolitan area.

== History ==
Mexico was laid out as "New Mexico" in 1836 and was a major stop for settlers heading to the Republic of Texas (thus the name "New Mexico"), and it became the county seat under its present name in 1837. The word "New" was dropped after the Mexican War that saw Texas become a part of the United States.

There is an apocryphal story about the name. When a University of Missouri student, who was questioned on radio, was unable to give an account of her hometown's name, the question was put to L. Mitchell White, then editor and publisher of the Mexico Ledger: "'The first settlers found a wooden sign along the trail. It pointed southwest, and on it had been painted Mexico.'" To avoid unnecessary labor, the sign was left in place. "It was easier to call their town 'Mexico' than to take down the old sign."

Mexico was incorporated as a town in 1855, was served by the Wabash Railroad in 1858 and by the Alton Railroad in 1872, and was first chartered as a city in 1874. The city is in the bluegrass region of Missouri, and was a shipping point for horses and mules. Mexico was a onetime major source for the nation's fire brick production, so much so that it adopted the moniker "Fire Brick Capital of the World". Bricks produced in Mexico were used in the construction of the NASA rocket launch site in Cape Canaveral. The industry fell on hard times and both major refractory plants in the area closed in 2002. There is no active quarrying for clay used in fire brick or refractories production in the area.

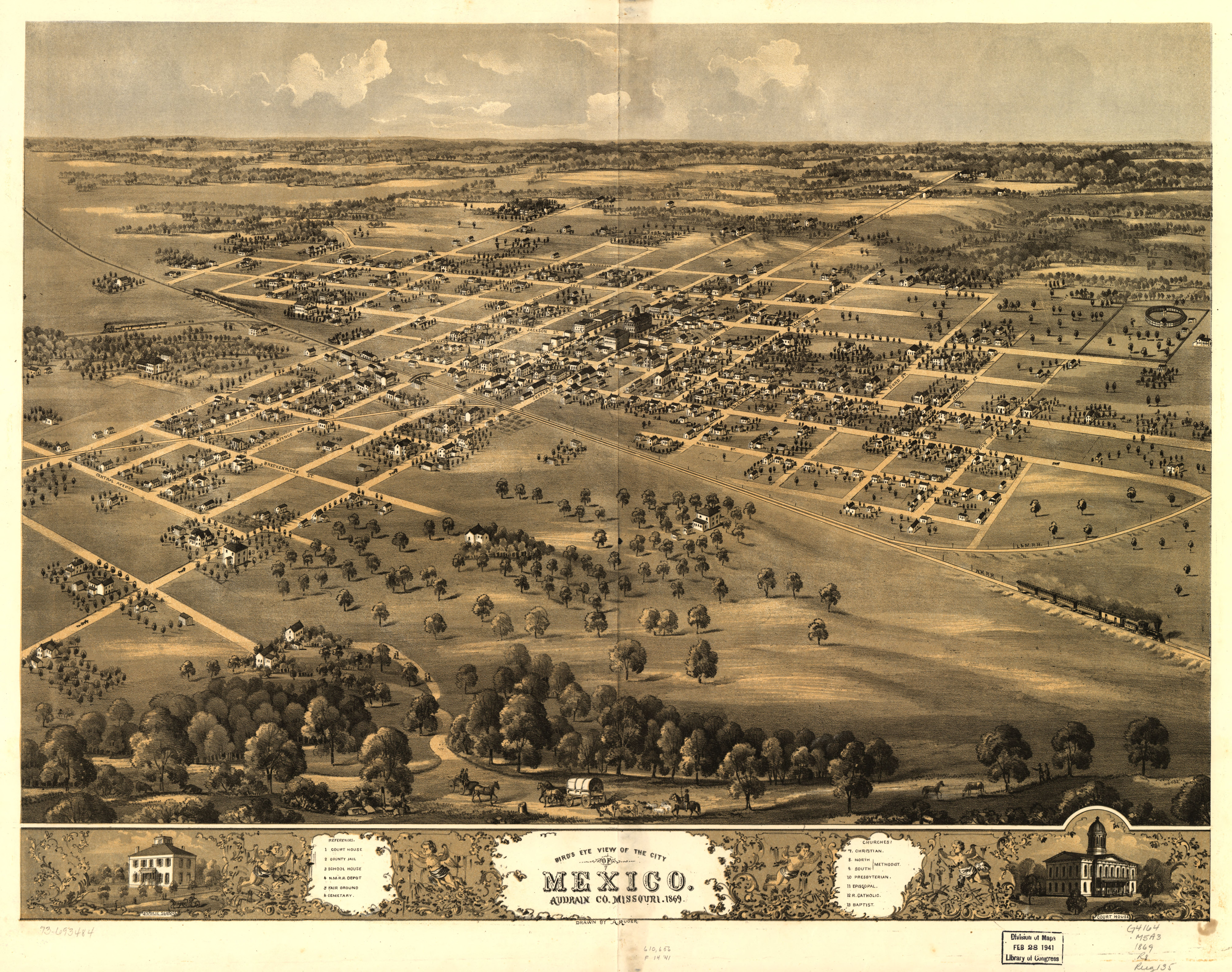
Bird's eye view of the city of Mexico, Audrian Co., Missouri 1869.

Mexico is located in the central region of Missouri known as "Little Dixie," so named because of the settlement of the region by whites from border south states, intent on reproducing the ways and means of the Deep South. Over half of the enslaved population of Missouri was concentrated in Little Dixie counties, and was the epicenter to much of Missouri's racist violence in the 19th and 20th centuries. Mexico competed with other MO cities for the title, "Capital of Little Dixie."

The historic downtown square, with the typical courthouse as the focal point, is surrounded by dozens of multi-story brick buildings—some dating to the founding of the community. There are, of course, other historic spots including Simmons Stables and Graceland. In the late 1970s, Mexico began ripping up crumbling sidewalks of the downtown square and installing red paver bricks accented with turn-of-the-century lamp posts and park benches. In the 1980s, Mexico was one of six nationwide finalists for Saturn's new U.S. auto plant. It lost to Spring Hill, Tennessee because Mexico was not served by a four-lane freeway. So as not to lose future development, Mexico officials quickly lobbied state and federal officials to secure funding for a new four-lane divided highway (U.S. Route 54) which now serves the community from Interstate 70. Formerly known as the "Saddle Horse Capital of the World," Mexico still hosts Hollywood celebrities and other visitors from around the world who come to purchase riding horses. The Simmons Stables, currently being revitalized, are now listed on the National Register of Historic Places.

The Audrain County Courthouse, Ross House, and Arthur Simmons Stables Historic District are listed on the National Register of Historic Places.

== Geography ==
Mexico is located approximately 100 miles northwest of St Louis at the intersection of US Route 54 and state routes 22 and 15. According to the United States Census Bureau, the city has a total area of 12.38 square miles (32.06 km^{2}), of which 12.01 square miles (31.11 km^{2}) is land and 0.37 square miles (0.96 km^{2}) is water.

=== Climate ===
Climate data for Mexico, Missouri (1991–2020 normals, extremes 1893–2013)
Month	Jan	Feb	Mar	Apr	May	Jun	Jul	Aug	Sep	Oct	Nov	Dec	Year
Record high °F (°C)	77 (25)	80 (27)	93 (34)	94 (34)	100 (38)	106 (41)	116 (47)	115 (46)	108 (42)	98 (37)	88 (31)	76 (24)	116 (47)
Mean daily maximum °F (°C)	37.6 (3.1)	42.7 (5.9)	54.2 (12.3)	65.9 (18.8)	75.1 (23.9)	83.9 (28.8)	87.9 (31.1)	86.6 (30.3)	79.4 (26.3)	67.6 (19.8)	54.3 (12.4)	41.9 (5.5)	64.8 (18.2)
Daily mean °F (°C)	28.4 (−2.0)	32.8 (0.4)	43.0 (6.1)	54.4 (12.4)	64.3 (17.9)	73.4 (23.0)	77.6 (25.3)	75.8 (24.3)	67.9 (19.9)	56.0 (13.3)	44.0 (6.7)	33.0 (0.6)	54.2 (12.3)
Mean daily minimum °F (°C)	19.3 (−7.1)	22.9 (−5.1)	31.8 (−0.1)	42.9 (6.1)	53.5 (11.9)	62.8 (17.1)	67.3 (19.6)	65.0 (18.3)	56.4 (13.6)	44.5 (6.9)	33.7 (0.9)	24.1 (−4.4)	43.7 (6.5)
Record low °F (°C)	−22 (−30)	−25 (−32)	−12 (−24)	11 (−12)	27 (−3)	39 (4)	46 (8)	39 (4)	25 (−4)	17 (−8)	−3 (−19)	−25 (−32)	−25 (−32)
Average precipitation inches (mm)	2.03 (52)	2.31 (59)	3.17 (81)	4.68 (119)	5.07 (129)	5.23 (133)	4.43 (113)	3.90 (99)	4.86 (123)	2.81 (71)	2.75 (70)	2.28 (58)	43.52 (1,105)
Average precipitation days (≥ 0.01 in)	7.8	7.0	10.1	10.7	12.2	9.7	9.1	7.0	7.4	8.0	7.6	7.8	104.4
Source: NOAA

== Demographics ==
Historical population
Census	Pop.	Note	%±
1860	960		—
1870	2,602		171.0%
1880	3,835		47.4%
1890	4,789		24.9%
1900	5,099		6.5%
1910	5,939		16.5%
1920	6,013		1.2%
1930	8,290		37.9%
1940	9,053		9.2%
1950	11,623		28.4%
1960	12,889		10.9%
1970	11,807		−8.4%
1980	12,276		4.0%
1990	11,290		−8.0%
2000	11,320		0.3%
2010	11,543		2.0%
2020	11,469		−0.6%
U.S. Decennial Census; 2020 Census

=== 2020 census ===
As of the 2020 census, Mexico had a population of 11,469 people in 4,700 households, including 2,880 families. The population density was 945.5 per square mile (365.1/km^{2}). The median age was 39.3 years. 24.1% of residents were under the age of 18 and 20.9% were 65 years of age or older. For every 100 females there were 90.9 males, and for every 100 females age 18 and over there were 84.6 males age 18 and over.

96.6% of residents lived in urban areas, while 3.4% lived in rural areas.

Of the 4,700 households, 30.6% had children under the age of 18 living in them. Of all households, 38.1% were married-couple households, 19.4% were households with a male householder and no spouse or partner present, and 33.7% were households with a female householder and no spouse or partner present. About 33.6% of all households were made up of individuals and 14.8% had someone living alone who was 65 years of age or older. The average household size was 2.5 and the average family size was 3.2.

There were 5,200 housing units, of which 9.6% were vacant. The homeowner vacancy rate was 2.9% and the rental vacancy rate was 7.3%.

Racial composition as of the 2020 census
Race	Number	Percent
White	9,327	81.3%
Black or African American	951	8.3%
American Indian and Alaska Native	42	0.4%
Asian	87	0.8%
Native Hawaiian and Other Pacific Islander	2	0.0%
Some other race	181	1.6%
Two or more races	879	7.7%
Hispanic or Latino (of any race)	366	3.2%

=== Income and poverty ===
The 2016–2020 5-year American Community Survey estimates show that the median household income was $40,741 (with a margin of error of +/- $4,474) and the median family income was $48,720 (+/- $2,765). Males had a median income of $31,850 (+/- $2,426) versus $26,335 (+/- $2,652) for females. The median income for those above 16 years old was $29,630 (+/- $3,280). Approximately, 13.8% of families and 15.7% of the population were below the poverty line, including 26.4% of those under the age of 18 and 10.9% of those ages 65 or over.

=== 2010 census ===
As of the census of 2010, there were 11,543 people, 4,727 households, and 2,908 families residing in the city. The population density was 961.1 inhabitants per square mile (371.1/km^{2}). There were 5,272 housing units at an average density of 439.0 units per square mile (169.5 units/km^{2}). The racial makeup of the city was 86.1% White, 8.3% Black, 0.4% Native American, 0.8% Asian, 0.1% Pacific Islander, 2.1% from other races, and 2.4% from two or more races. Hispanic or Latino of any race were 4.1% of the population.

There were 4,727 households, of which 31.9% had children under the age of 18 living with them, 40.9% were married couples living together, 15.6% had a female householder with no husband present, 5.0% had a male householder with no wife present, and 38.5% were non-families. 32.4% of all households were made up of individuals, and 14.7% had someone living alone who was 65 years of age or older. The average household size was 2.33 and the average family size was 2.91.

The median age in the city was 36.7 years. 26.6% of residents were under the age of 18; 9.1% were between the ages of 18 and 24; 23.5% were from 25 to 44; 23.8% were from 45 to 64; and 17% were 65 years of age or older. The gender makeup of the city was 48.3% male and 51.7% female.

== Education ==
Mexico was the location of Hardin College and Conservatory of Music, a Baptist college established in 1873 for young women, an institution founded and endowed by Charles H. Hardin, governor of the state from 1872 to 1874. It closed during the Great Depression and never reopened. Its 1,200-seat auditorium has been painstakingly restored and is now used for community theater and concerts. The remainder of the college houses the Mexico Public Schools administrative offices on South Jefferson Street. Its mascot is a bulldog.

It is served by the Mexico Public Schools. Public schools in the city include Mexico Senior High School, Mexico Middle School, Hawthorne Elementary School, Eugene Field Elementary School, and McMillan Early Learning Center. Private schools include St. Brendan's Catholic School. The Mexico Area Vocational-Technical School, the Advanced Technology Center and the Missouri Military Academy are also located in the city.

Mexico has a lending library, a branch of the Mexico-Audrain Library District.

== Media ==
Mexico, as with the rest of Audrain County, is part of the Columbia/Jefferson City television market. Televisions in Mexico can receive a strong signal from CTN affiliate KFDR (channel 25), moderate signals from NBC/The CW affiliate KOMU-TV (channel 8), CBS affiliate KRCG (channel 13), ABC/MyNetworkTV/Fox affiliate KMIZ (channel 17), CTN affiliate WTJR (channel 16), and weak signals from PBS affiliate KMOS-TV (channel 6), NBC/The CW/Fox affiliate WGEM-TV (channel 10), and CBS/ABC affiliate KHQA-TV (channel 7). WTJR, WGEM and KHQA are licensed to Quincy, Illinois and Hannibal, Missouri, respectively.

Mexico radios can pick up stations from Columbia, Jefferson City, Moberly, and Hannibal. 4 radio stations are also licensed to the city: adult contemporary formatted KXEO (1340 AM), gospel formatted KJAB (88.3 FM), public formatted KAUD (90.5 FM; simulcast of KBIA 91.3 FM in Columbia), and country formatted KWWR (95.7 FM; sister to KXEO).

== Notable people ==
- Tom Bass (1859–1934), horse trainer
- Cookie Belcher (born 1978), basketball player
- Howard L. Bickley (1871–1947), judge
- Click Bishop (born 1957), politician
- Kit Bond (1939–2025), politician
- Jason Brookins (born 1976), football player
- Ira L. Cooper (c.1878–1939), police detective
- Naomi Pollard Dobson (1883–1971), librarian and educator
- Pendleton Dudley (1876–1966), journalist and public relations executive
- Peter Fairbanks (born 1993), baseball player
- Pat Fleming (born 1949), politician
- Charles Henry Hardin (1820–1892), politician
- Edward D. "Ted" Jones (1925–1990), broker
- Howard Kindig (born 1941), football player
- Tyronn Lue (born 1977), basketball player and coach
- Martha Mears, singer
- Prim Siripipat (born 1981), television anchor
- John Smith (1784–1868), restoration leader
- Lebbeus R. Wilfley (1866–1926), judge
- Xenophon P. Wilfley (1871–1931), politician

== See also ==
- List of cities in Missouri
- National Register of Historic Places listings in Missouri
