= Tairov OKO-4 =

Attack aircraft designed in the Ukrainian SSR

OKO-4

General information
- Type: Attack aircraft (Shturmovik)
- National origin: USSR
- Manufacturer: OKO (Kiev)
- Designer: Vsevolod Konstantinovich Tairov

The Tairov OKO-4 (Opytno KonstrooktOrskoye - experimental design section) was an attack aircraft produced in the Ukrainian SSR in the USSR in 1939.

== Development ==
This small sesquiplane attack fighter was completed in 1939, but was unsuccessful. The prototype was never flown and further work was cancelled.

== Specifications (OKO-4) ==
Data from Gunston, Bill. "Encyclopaedia of Russian Aircraft 1875-1995". London:Osprey. 1995. ISBN 1-85532-405-9

General characteristics

- Powerplant: 1 × Tumanskii M-88 , 708.4 or 745.7 kW (950 or 1,000 hp)

Performance

== See also ==
Aircraft of comparable role, configuration, and era

- Polikarpov I-153 – 1930s Soviet fighter aircraft
- Curtiss SBC Helldiver – US navy biplane

Related lists

- List of aircraft
