= Tairov OKO-7 =

OKO-7

General information
- Type: Heavy fighter
- National origin: USSR
- Designer: Vsevolod Konstantinovich Tairov

The OKO-7 was to have been a heavy fighter produced in the Ukraine region of the USSR in 1940

Designed to a 1940 VVS requirement for a heavy fighter, the OKO-7 was to have been powered by two I,500hp Shvetsov M-90 (Ash-90) or two 1,380hp Mikulin AM-37 engines, with armament of three 20mm ShVAK cannon and two 7.62mm ShKAS machine-guns. The OKO-7 was Tairov's last known design before he was killed in an air crash in December 1941.

== Specifications (OKO-7) ==
Data from Gunston, Bill. "Encyclopaedia of Russian Aircraft 1875-1995". London:Osprey. 1995. ISBN 1-85532-405-9

General characteristics

- Crew: 1
- Powerplant: 2 × Shvetsov M-90 (Ash-90) , 1,118 kW (1,500 hp) each

Performance Armament

- 3 x 20 mm ShVAK cannon.
- 2 x 7.62 mm ShKAS machine guns.

== See also ==
Aircraft of comparable role, configuration, and era

- Lockheed XP-58 Chain Lightning

Related lists

- List of aircraft
