= Mont-Saint-Michel, Quebec =

Mont-Saint-Michel
- Municipality
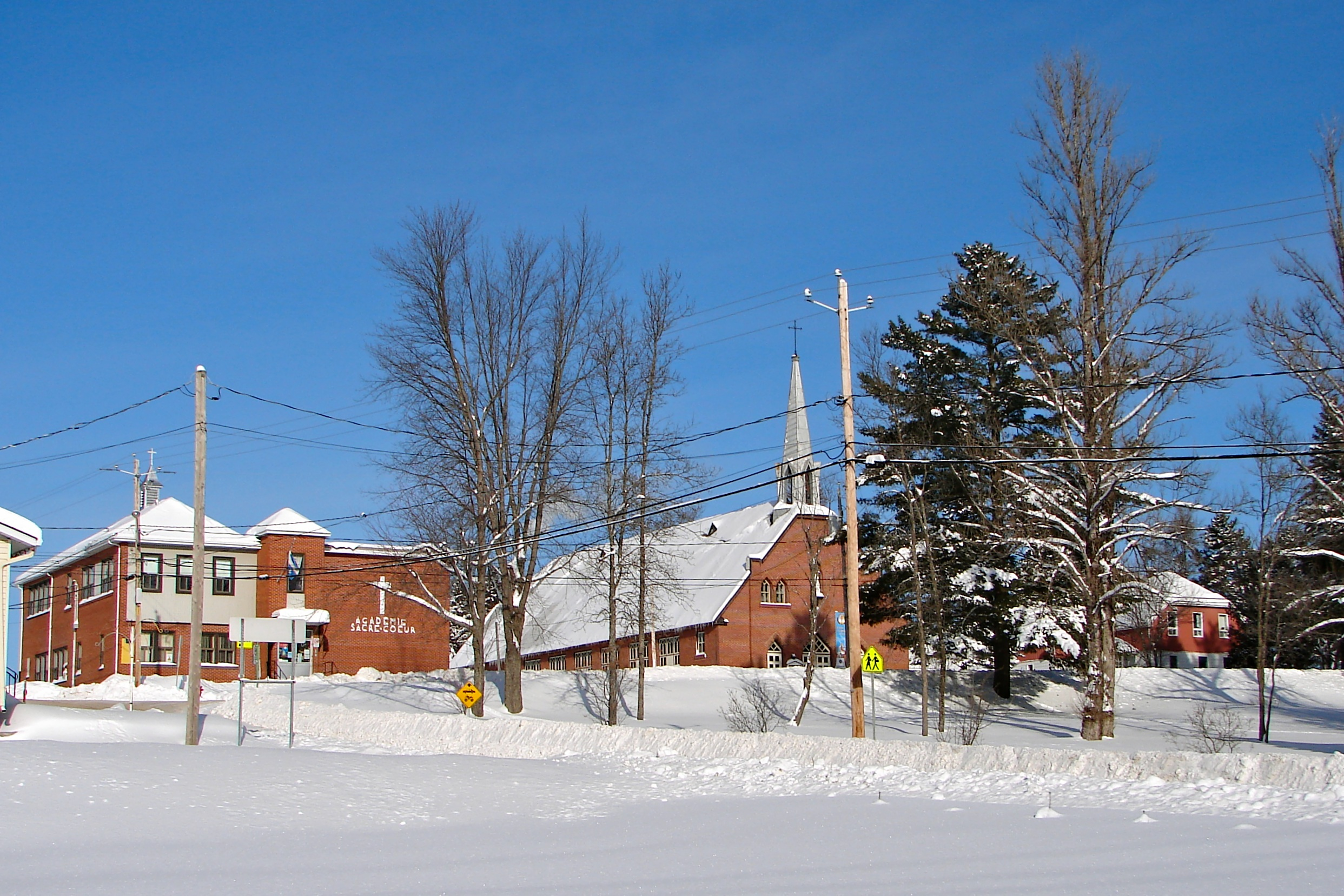
- Motto: Vaillants comme nos pionniers (Valiant like our pioneers)
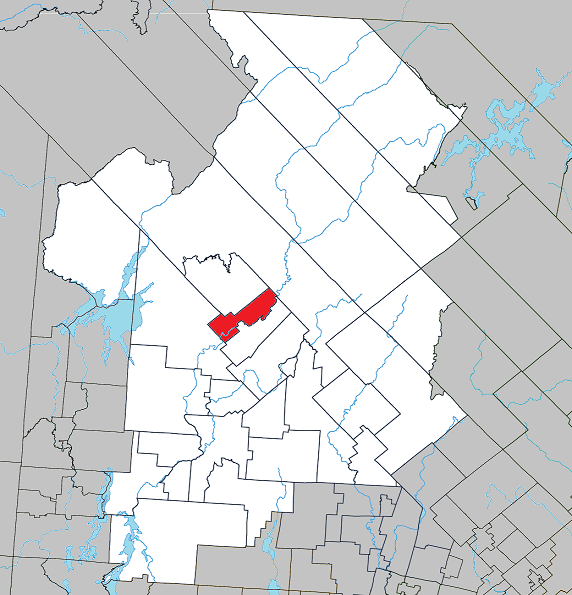
- Location within Antoine-Labelle RCM

- Location in central Quebec
- Coordinates: 46°47′N 75°20′W
- Country: Canada
- Province: Quebec
- Region: Laurentides
- RCM: Antoine-Labelle
- Constituted: September 11, 1928

Government
  - Mayor: André-Marcel Evéquoz
  - Federal riding: Laurentides—Labelle
  - Prov. riding: Labelle

Area
  - Total: 145.14 km^{2} (56.04 sq mi)
  - Land: 138.16 km^{2} (53.34 sq mi)

Population (2021)
  - Total: 581
  - Density: 4.2/km^{2} (11/sq mi)
  - Pop, 2016-2021: ▲0.9%
  - Dwellings: 382
- Time zone: UTC−5 (EST)
  - Summer (DST): UTC−4 (EDT)
- Postal code(s): J0W 1P0
- Area code: 819
- Highways: R-309; R-311
- Website: www.montsaintmichel.ca

Mont-Saint-Michel (French pronunciation: [mɔ̃ sɛ̃ miʃɛl]) is a municipality in the Laurentides region of Quebec, Canada, part of the Antoine-Labelle Regional County Municipality.

== Geography ==
The main population centre of Mont-Saint-Michel is located 35 kilometres (22 mi) north of Mont-Laurier on the western banks of the Lièvre River. Its territory is characterized by a vast swamp and natural bog. Lake Gravel is one notable lake with vacation cottages surrounding it.

== History ==
The place was originally called Saint-Michel-des-Cèdres, but it was renamed to avoid confusion with the similarly named Saint-Michel-des-Saints. In 1912, its post office opened, and in 1915, a parish was set up as a mission under the name Saint-Michel-Archange.

On September 11, 1928, the Municipality of Mont-Saint-Michel was created out of territory ceded from the United Township Municipality of Wurtele, Moreau et Gravel and Township of Décarie.

== Demographics ==
Canada census – Mont-Saint-Michel community profile

	2021	2016
Population	581 (+0.9% from 2016)	576 (-9.0% from 2011)
Land area	138.16 km^{2} (53.34 sq mi)	139.02 km^{2} (53.68 sq mi)
Population density	4.2/km^{2} (11/sq mi)	4.1/km^{2} (11/sq mi)
Median age	55.6 (M: 56.0, F: 55.2)	53.4 (M: 54.8, F: 52.6)
Private dwellings	382 (total) 280 (occupied)	424 (total)
Median household income	$54,400	$46,976

References: 2021 2016

Historical census populations – Mont-Saint-Michel, Quebec

Year	Pop.	±%
1976	672	—
1981	705	+4.9%
1986	680	−3.5%
1991	647	−4.9%
1996	616	−4.8%

Year	Pop.	±%
2001	619	+0.5%
2006	625	+1.0%
2011	633	+1.3%
2016	576	−9.0%
2021	581	+0.9%

Source: Statistics Canada

Private dwellings occupied by usual residents (2021): 280 (total dwellings: 382)

Mother tongue:

- English as first language: 1%
- French as first language: 98%
- English and French as first language: 0%
- Other as first language: 0%

== Local government ==
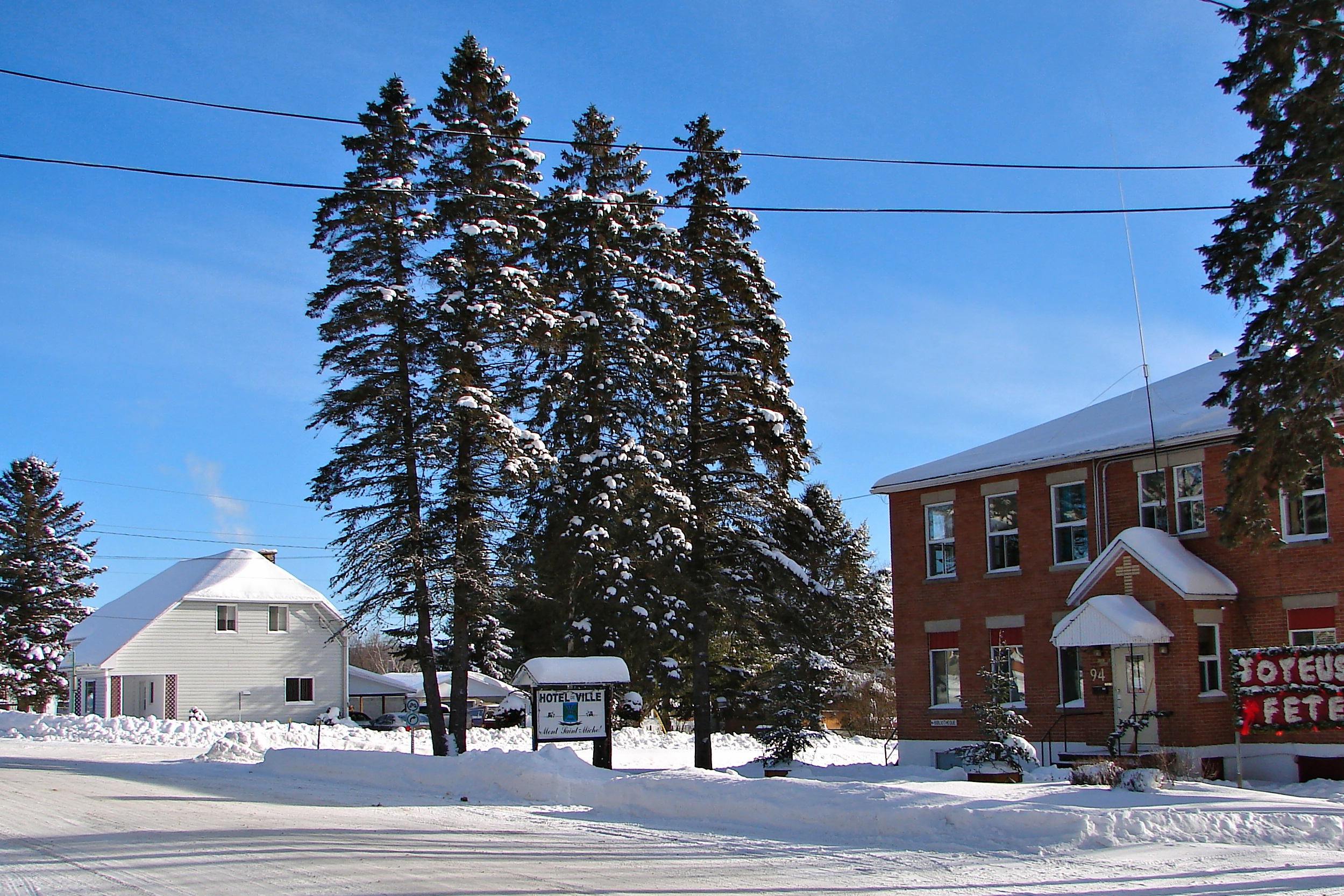
Mont-St-Michel municipal hall

List of former mayors:

- Roger Lapointe (...–2013)
- André-Marcel Évéquoz (2013–present)

== See also ==
- List of municipalities in Quebec
