= Piper LBP =

LBP-1
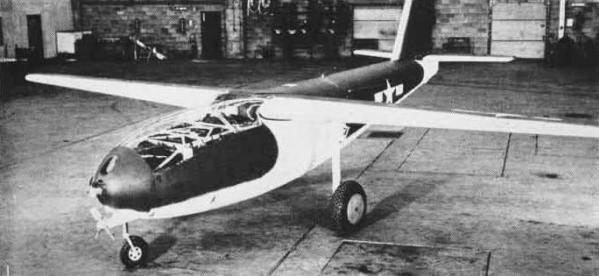

General information
- Type: Glide bomb
- Manufacturer: Piper Aircraft
- Primary user: United States Navy

The Piper LBP was a glide bomb, or "Glomb", developed by Piper Aircraft for the United States Navy during World War II. Developed as one of three "Glomb" aircraft, the inherent limitations of the Glomb and the technology of the time, combined with difficulties encountered in testing of the prototype, led to the production contract for the LBP-1 being reduced, then cancelled, with none of the Glomb aircraft ever seeing operational service.

== Design and development ==
During late 1940, a proposal was made to the United States Navy outlining a concept called "Glomb", for "glider bomb". The Glomb concept called for the construction of inexpensive gliders that would be remotely controlled from another aircraft to carry bombs to a target, thus reducing the risk to aircrew. Glomb was intended to be towed by an ordinary carrier-based aircraft to the area of the target, where it would be released; guidance following release would be provided via a TV camera located in the nose of the glider, which would transmit its signal to a piloted aircraft, an operator then using radio control to steer the Glomb to its target. Following consideration the Glomb concept was deemed to be potentially feasible, the project was given official status by the Bureau of Aeronautics in the April 1941.

Initial trials of Glomb involved conversions of existing gliders to remotely controlled status; these tests showed that the concept had promise and following a design competition, three companies were awarded contracts to develop operational "Glomb" aircraft. These contracts were given to Pratt-Read, Taylorcraft, and Piper Aircraft. Piper's design, designated LBP-1, was a conventional high-wing monoplane, fitted with tricycle landing gear, and intended to carry 4,000 pounds (1,800 kg) of bombs. Although the LBP-1 was fully capable of being remotely piloted via its TV-and-radio guidance system, it retained a cockpit, allowing the aircraft to be flown by a pilot on board for training and evaluation.

== Operational history ==
Although the initial contract awarded by the Navy called for the production of 100 LBP-1 Glombs, continued trials of the concept indicated that the glider's inherent low performance, combined with technical issues with the television guidance system, made the concept operationally unworkable. As a result, the LBP-1 production contract was reduced to only 35 aircraft in early 1945. In June of that year, the LBP-1 program was terminated, the aircraft having been determined to have dangerous characteristics when attempting landing at loaded weights.

== Specifications (LBP-1) ==
Data from

General characteristics

- Crew: One (optional)
- Length: 28 ft 9 in (8.76 m)
- Wingspan: 33 ft (10 m)
- Wing area: 173 sq ft (16.1 m^{2})
- Gross weight: 6,900 lb (3,130 kg)

Performance

- Maximum speed: 300 mph (480 km/h, 260 kn) in dive

Armament

- Bombs: 4,000 pounds (1,800 kg)

== See also ==
- ASM-N-2 Bat

Related development

- Pratt-Read LBE
- Taylorcraft LBT

Aircraft of comparable role, configuration, and era

- Cornelius XBG-3
- Fletcher FBT-2

Related lists

- List of United States Navy aircraft designations (pre-1962)
- List of unmanned aerial vehicles
