= DRS Sentry HP =

Sentry HP
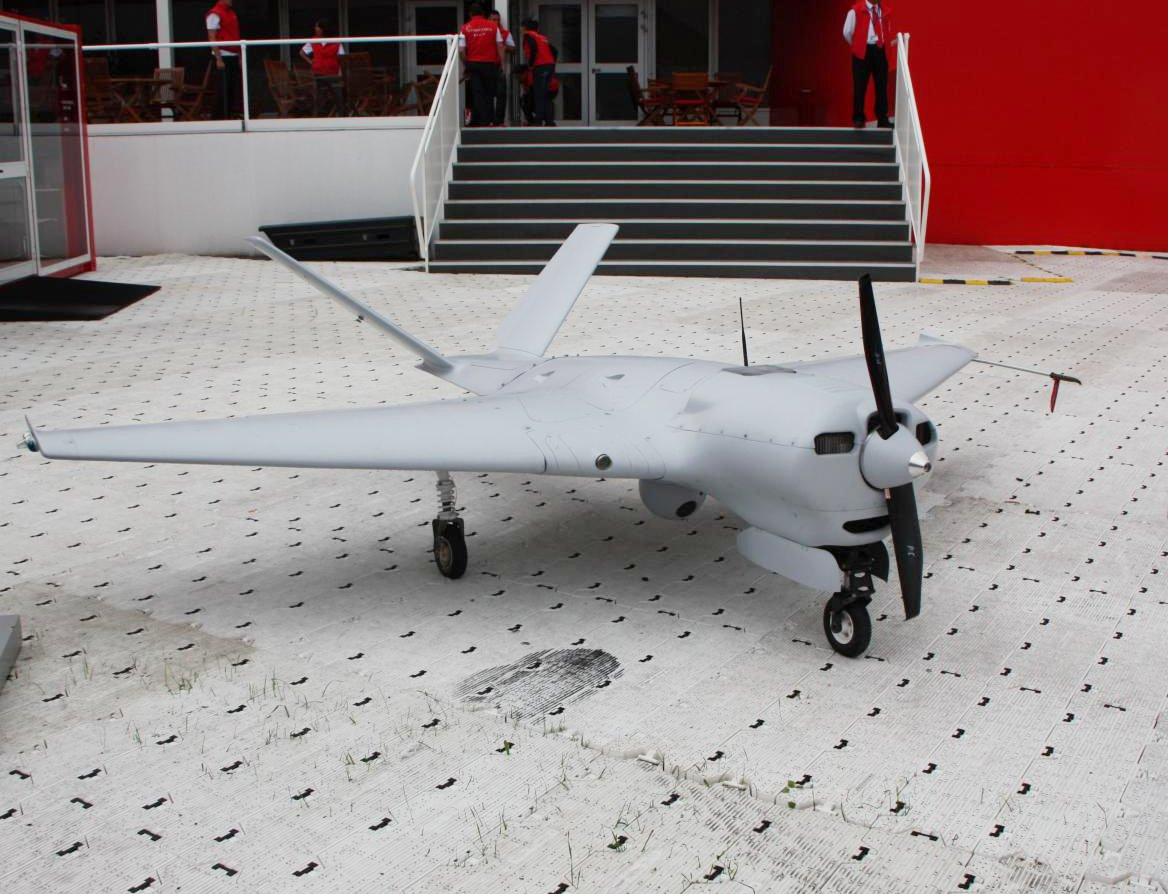
- Sentry HP at the 2010 Farnborough Airshow

General information
- Type: Reconnaissance UAV
- National origin: United States
- Manufacturer: DRS Technologies

The DRS Sentry HP is a reconnaissance UAV that was developed in the United States in the late 1980s by S-TEC. The program was acquired by Meggitt in 2000 and subsequently by DRS in 2002. Although the aircraft shares the name "Sentry" with a previous S-TEC design, the Sentry HP is a completely different machine, with a broad wing and a V tail. The Sentry HP is larger, with greater payload capacity and an underwing stores capability. It is powered by a variant of the same engine as the Sentry. It can be ordered with an option for fixed landing gear to permit conventional takeoff and recovery.

== Specifications ==
General characteristics

- Crew: None
- Capacity: 75 lb (34 kg) payload
- Length: 8 ft 5 in (2.57 m)
- Wingspan: 12 ft 10 in (3.90 m)
- Empty weight: 180 lb (82 kg)
- Gross weight: 325 lb (147 kg)
- Powerplant: 1 × Herbrandson Dyad 290 , 28 hp (21 kW)

Performance

- Maximum speed: 115 mph (185 km/h, 100 kn)
- Endurance: 8 hours
- Service ceiling: 16,000 ft (4,900 m)
