= Taylorcraft LBT =

LBT-1

General information
- Type: Glide bomb
- Manufacturer: Taylorcraft
- Primary user: United States Navy
- Number built: 25

History
- First flight: April 1944

The Taylorcraft LBT was a glider designed and built by Taylorcraft during World War II, in response to a United States Navy requirement for a glide bomb. One of three prototype "Glomb" models ordered by the Navy, the LBT suffered from technical and performance difficulties, and was cancelled early in production, none of the aircraft seeing operational service.

== Design and development ==
During December 1940, the United States Navy began studies of a proposed "glider bomb", which was intended to be an inexpensive, unpowered aircraft, remotely controlled from another, conventional aircraft, that would be capable of delivering bombs to an enemy target without putting aircrew at risk to the target's defenses. The glider bomb, or "Glomb", would be towed by an ordinary carrier-based aircraft to the area of its target; guidance following release of the glider from its towing aircraft was intended to be provided by a TV camera located in the nose of the glider, which would transmit its signal to a piloted aircraft, an operator aboard the control aircraft using radio control to steer the Glomb to its target. Following the Navy's initial evaluation, the Glomb comcept was deemed to be worth developing further, and the project was given official status by the Bureau of Aeronautics in April 1941.

The initial trials of the Glomb concept were conducted using conversions of existing gliders for unpiloted, remotely controlled flight; these tests seemed to indicate that the concept had promise, and a request for designs from industry was issued. Three companies were awarded contracts to develop operational "Glomb" aircraft, the contracts being given to Pratt-Read, Piper Aircraft, and Taylorcraft. The Taylorcraft design, designated LBT-1 by the Navy, was based on the company's LNT-1 training glider; two XLNT-1s, converted to remote control, had been tested as part of initial Glomb trials. The LBT-1 featured a high, strut-braced wing and tricycle landing gear; the aircraft was designed to carry a 2,000 pounds (910 kg) bomb as a warhead. In addition to its TV-and-radio remote guidance system, the LBT-1 retained a cockpit, allowing a pilot on board to fly the aircraft on training and evaluation flights.

== Operational history ==
The LBT-1 began evaluation by the Navy in April 1944. The Navy's contract called for the production of 100 of each type of Glomb; however, by October 1944, trials were beginning to indicate that the low expected performance of the glider bomb was a liability, and the Piper LBP-1 and LBE-1 were considered superior. Accordingly, the LBT contract was cancelled; only 25 examples of the type were constructed, none of which would see any operational service.

== Specifications (LBT-1) ==
Data from

General characteristics

- Crew: One (optional)
- Length: 25 ft 2 in (7.67 m)
- Wingspan: 35 ft (11 m)
- Wing area: 181 sq ft (16.8 m^{2})
- Gross weight: 3,930 lb (1,783 kg)

Performance

- Maximum speed: 314 mph (505 km/h, 273 kn) in dive
- Cruise speed: 240 mph (390 km/h, 210 kn) tow speed

Armament

- Bombs: 2,000 pounds (910 kg)

== See also ==
- ASM-N-2 Bat

Related development

- Piper LBP
- Pratt-Read LBE

Aircraft of comparable role, configuration, and era

- Cornelius XBG-3
- Fletcher FBT-2

Related lists

- List of United States Navy aircraft designations (pre-1962)
- List of unmanned aerial vehicles
