= Fletcher Aviation =

American aircraft manufacturer, 1941–1994

Fletcher Aviation Corporation
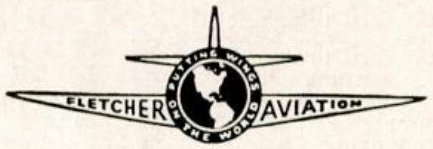
- Industry: Aerospace
- Founded: 1941
- Founders: Frank Fletcher; Maurice Fletcher; Wendell Fletcher
- Successor: Sargent Fletcher
- Headquarters: Pasadena, California, United States
- Key people: John Thorp
- Parent: AJ Industries

Fletcher Aviation Corporation was an aircraft manufacturer founded by three brothers, Wendell, Frank, and Maurice Fletcher, in Pasadena, California, in 1941.

== History ==
The initial aim of the company was to produce a wooden basic trainer aircraft (the FBT-2) that Wendell had designed, but despite brief interest by the Army in the type to use as a target drone, nothing came of this aircraft. After relocating to Rosemead, California, later projects involved a family of related designs, including the FU-24 agricultural aircraft of which 296 were produced in New Zealand with many still operating today.

During the Korean War the company purchased Rosemead Airport from Bob and Jack Heasley. The roughly triangular property is located south of the 10 freeway, although the airport pre-dates the freeway. The property extended from Rosemead Boulevard on the west to the Rio Hondo river basin on the south and east.

In 1953, the same year the FU-24 debuted, they also produced a prototype amphibious vehicle known as the Fletcher Flair. The vehicle was powered by a 4-cylinder Porsche 356 drivetrain, modified to make it a four-wheel drive. The company hoped to sell the vehicle to the US Army but the vehicle performed poorly in the water and the Army passed.

Purchased by AJ Industries, it changed its name to Flair Aviation in 1960, and produced aircraft fuelling equipment, including drop tanks and hose reels for inflight refuelling. Moved to El Monte, California, its name was changed back to Fletcher and then Sargent Fletcher in 1964 before abandoning aircraft manufacturing in 1966, with rights to the FU-24 going to Pacific Aerospace. Sargent Fletcher was purchased by Cobham plc in 1994.

== Aircraft ==
Model name	First flight	Number built	Type
Fletcher FBT-2	1941	1	Single engine monoplane trainer
Fletcher BG-1		10	Flying bomb
Fletcher FL-23	1950	1	Single engine monoplane liaison airplane
Fletcher FU-24	1954	72	Single engine monoplane agricultural airplane
Fletcher FD-25	1953	3	Single engine monoplane light ground attack airplane
Fletcher BG-2	N/A	0	Unbuilt flying bomb
