= S-TEC =

S-TEC may refer to:

- S-TEC Corporation, a US corporation and manufacturer of flight control systems
- Daewoo S-TEC engine, low-displacement engine codeveloped by Suzuki and Daewoo Motors
