= Cobham Analytic Solutions =

Cobham Analytic Solutions (formerly SPARTA, Inc.) is a United States defense contractor based in Lake Forest, California. It was started in 1979 and has more than 20 offices around the United States. The acronym, SPARTA, stood for "Systems Planning Analysis Research and Technology Associates."

Prior to its acquisition by Cobham plc, SPARTA was unusual for a U.S. defense contractor in that it was publicly held but privately traded; it was more than 98% owned by its 1,300 employees. Employees were granted stock options based on various criteria, including corporate profit and individual contribution to bringing in new business. Employees could sell stock back to the company when their options vested, at a price determined by a formula for valuing the company.

Prior to the acquisition, some benefits and company procedures were decided upon by a council of employees which met annually. Slightly fewer than one third of the representatives to the council were elected by the employees.

In June 2008, SPARTA was acquired by Cobham plc for US$407 million. It was renamed Cobham Analytic Solutions.
