= Alan Rudge =

British electrical engineer (born 1937)

Sir Alan Rudge CBE FRS FREng

Chairman, ERA Foundation
- In office 2001 – December 2012

Chairman, ERA Technology
- In office 1997–2003

Personal details
- Born: Alan Walter Rudge; 17 October 1937 (age 88) London, England
- Occupation: Electrical engineer

Sir Alan Walter Rudge (born 17 October 1937, London) is a British electrical engineer. He was Chairman of the ERA Foundation from its formation until December 2012, after which he was appointed as the Foundation's President. In 2012 he also stepped down as chairman of the board of Management of the Royal Commission for the Exhibition of 1851, a position he had held for eleven years; he had succeeded Sir Denis Rooke and was himself succeeded by Bernard Taylor.

== Life ==
He earned a BSc from the London Polytechnic in 1964 and a PhD in Electrical Engineering from the University of Birmingham in 1968. He was head of operations at British Telecommunications. He was Chairman of the Engineering and Physical Sciences Research Council. He is a past President of the Institution of Electrical Engineers and was Chairman of the Engineering Council. He was appointed a Fellow of the Royal Academy of Engineering in 1984.

He was until July 2014 deputy chairman and senior independent director on the board of Experian plc.

In 1994 he was invited to deliver the MacMillan Memorial Lecture to the Institution of Engineers and Shipbuilders in Scotland. He chose the subject "Multimedia and the Information Superhighway".

In 1995, he was awarded an honorary doctorate of science by the University of Bath.

In the New Year Honours list for 2000 he was appointed Knight Bachelor for services to Engineering Research and to Industry.

== Climate change ==
He is a member of the academic advisory council of the Global Warming Policy Foundation, a climate change denial think tank chaired by Nigel Lawson.

In 2010 he organized a petition of 43 denialists (about 3% of the membership) challenging the Royal Society's "unnecessarily alarmist position" on climate change. He told The Times that "there is a lot of science to be done before we can be certain about climate change and before we impose upon ourselves the huge economic burden of cutting emissions." The revised guidance was published in September 2010 and its lead conclusion was "There is strong evidence that changes in greenhouse gas concentrations due to human activity are the dominant cause of the global warming that has taken place over the last half century".
