= Electronic flight instrument system =

Display system in an aircraft's cockpit which displays flight information electronically

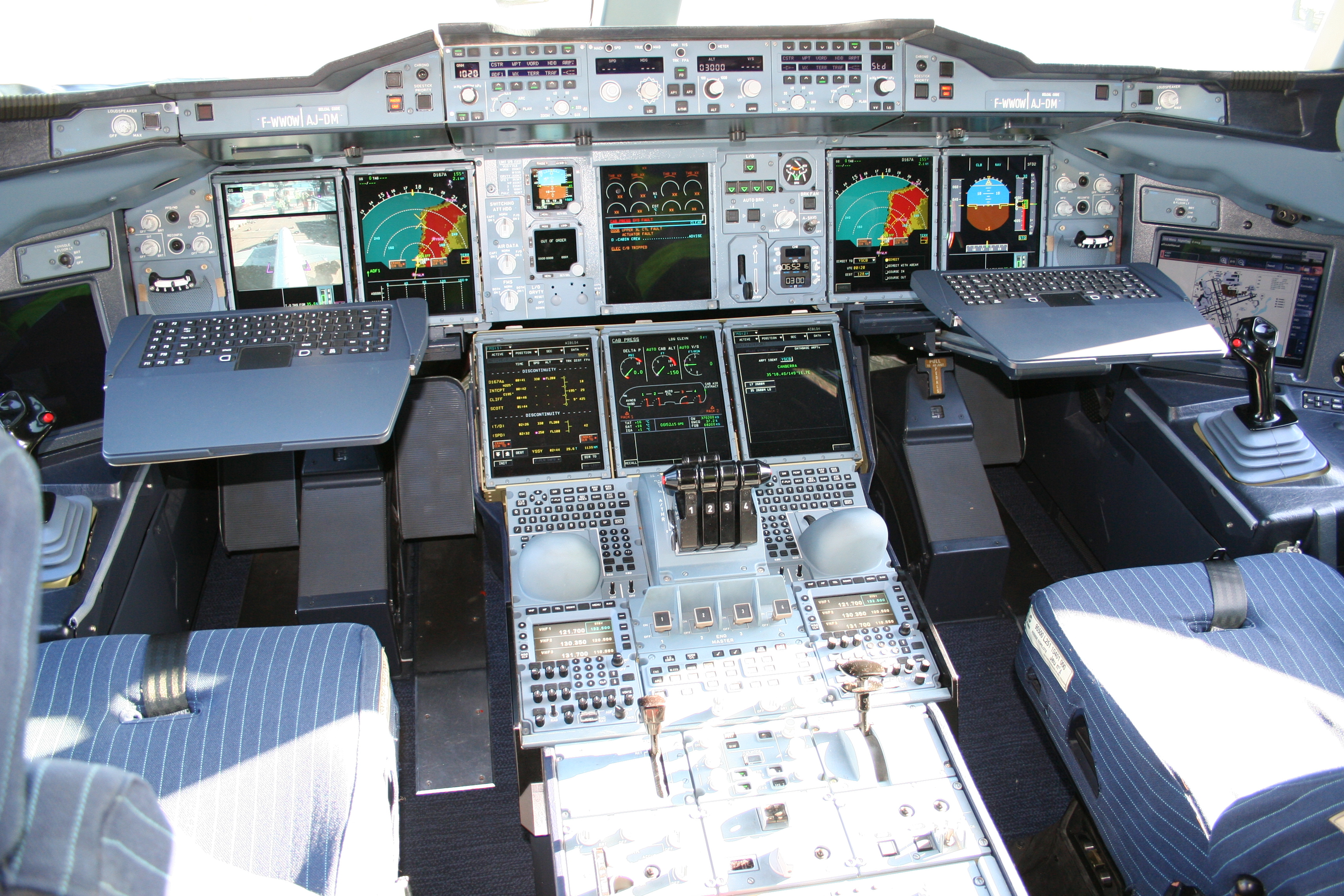
EFIS on an Airbus A380

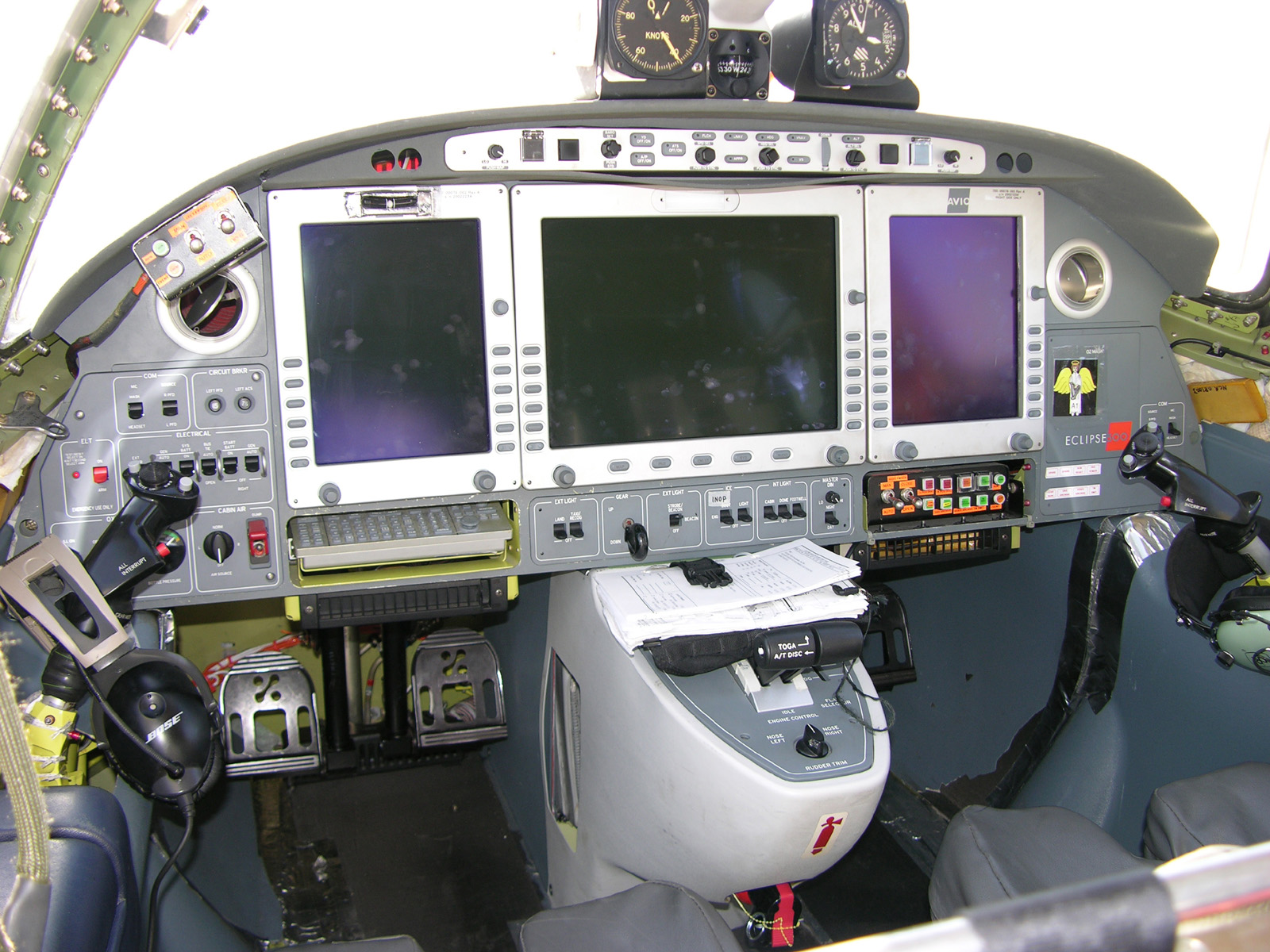
EFIS on an Eclipse 500

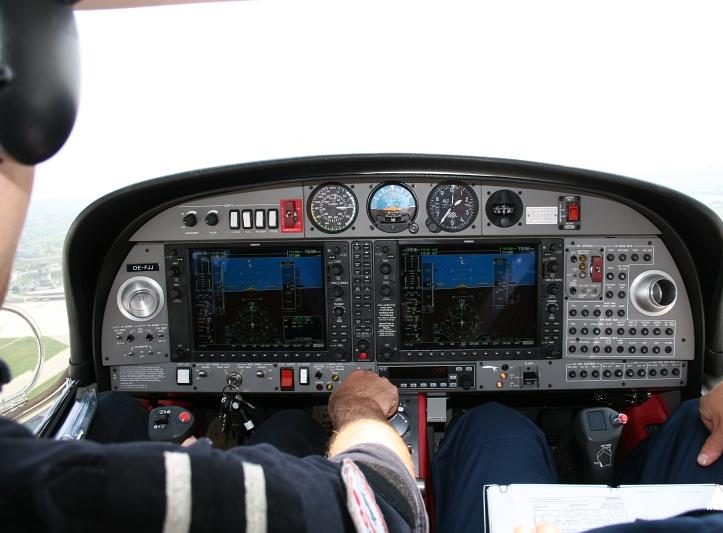
Garmin G1000 on a Diamond DA42

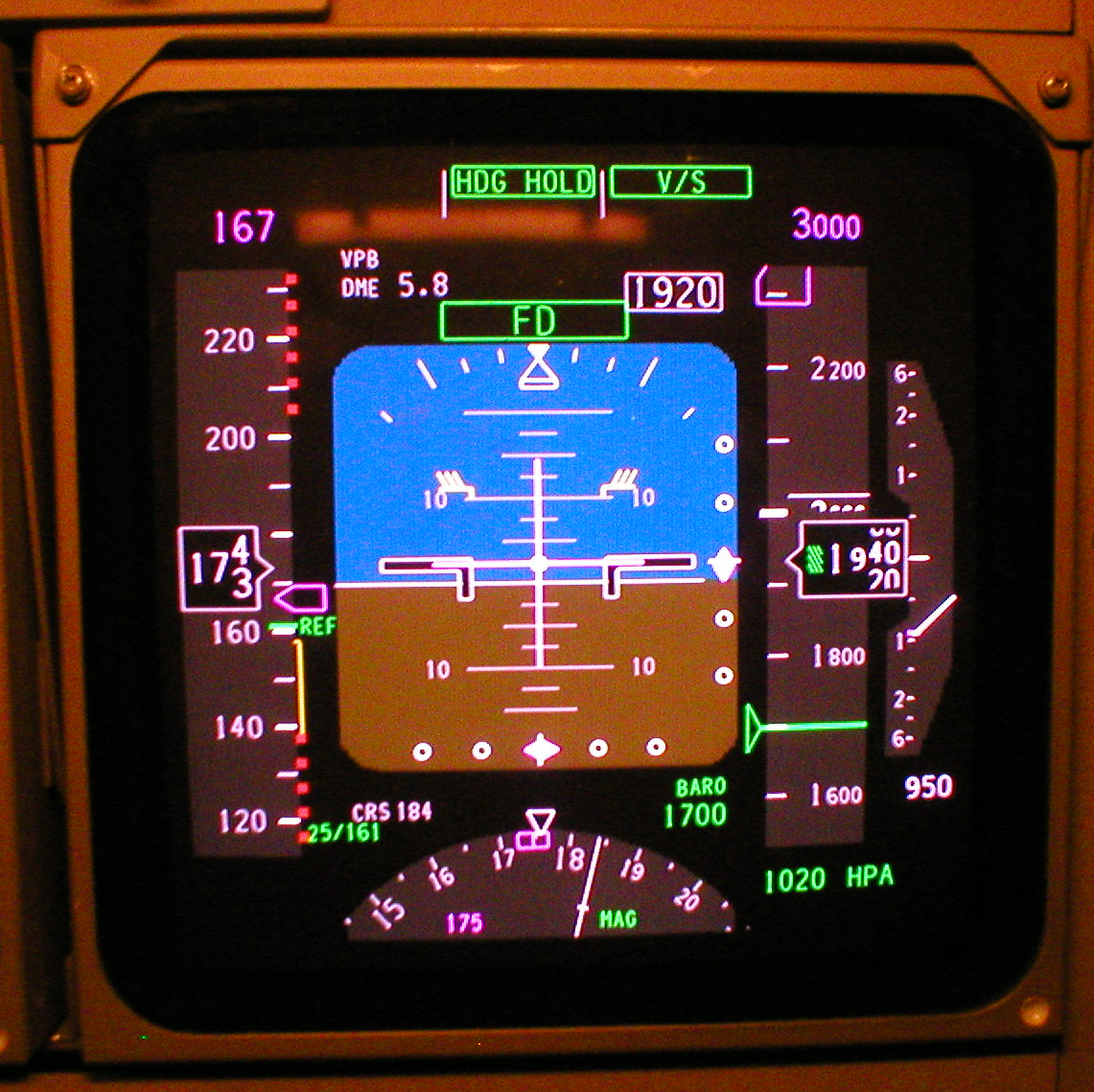
Primary flight display of a Boeing 747-400

In aviation, an electronic flight instrument system (EFIS) is a flight instrument display system in an aircraft cockpit that displays flight data electronically rather than electromechanically. An EFIS normally consists of a primary flight display (PFD), multi-function display (MFD), and an engine indicating and crew alerting system (EICAS) display. Early EFIS models used cathode-ray tube (CRT) displays, but liquid crystal displays (LCD) have become more common. The complex electromechanical attitude director indicator (ADI) and horizontal situation indicator (HSI) were the first candidates for replacement by EFIS. Since then, however, few flight deck instruments cannot be replaced by an electronic display.

== Display units ==
=== Primary flight display (PFD) ===
On the flight deck, the display units are the most obvious parts of an EFIS system, and are the features that lead to the term glass cockpit. The display unit that replaces the artificial horizon is called the primary flight display (PFD). If a separate display replaces the HSI, it is called the navigation display. The PFD displays all information critical to flight, including calibrated airspeed, altitude, heading, attitude, vertical speed and yaw. The PFD is designed to improve a pilot's situational awareness by integrating this information into a single display instead of six different analog instruments, reducing the amount of time necessary to monitor the instruments. PFDs also increase situational awareness by alerting the aircrew to unusual or potentially hazardous conditions — for example, low airspeed, high rate of descent — by changing the color or shape of the display or by providing audio alerts.

The names Electronic Attitude Director Indicator and Electronic Horizontal Situation Indicator are used by some manufacturers. However, a simulated ADI is only the centerpiece of the PFD. Additional information is both superimposed on and arranged around this graphic.

Multi-function displays can render a separate navigation display unnecessary. Another option is to use one large screen to show both the PFD and navigation display.

The PFD and navigation display (and multi-function display, where fitted) are often physically identical. The information displayed is determined by the system interfaces where the display units are fitted. Thus, spares holding is simplified: the one display unit can be fitted in any position.

LCD units generate less heat than CRTs; an advantage in a congested instrument panel. They are also lighter, and occupy a lower volume.

=== Multi-function display (MFD) ===
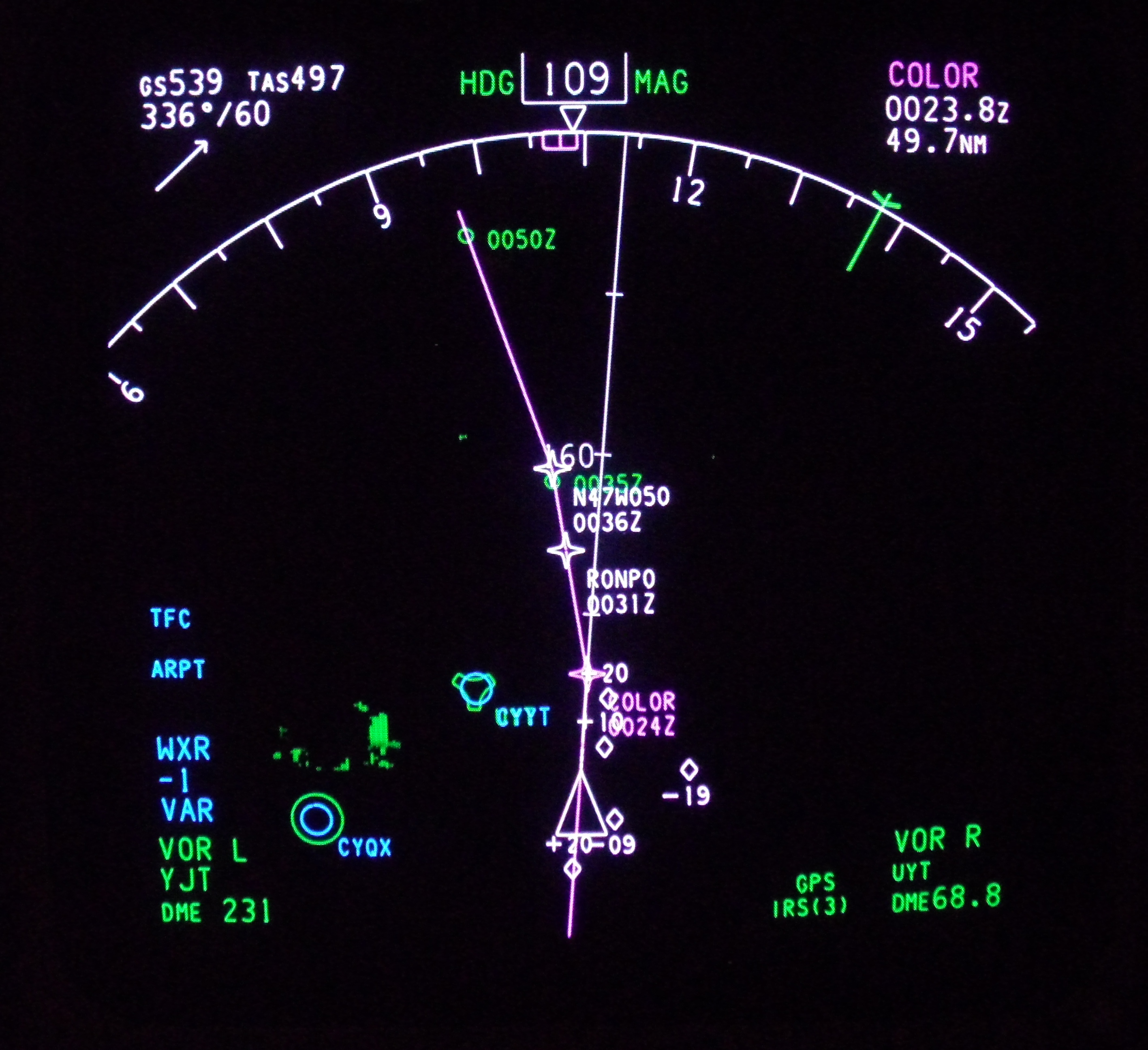
The navigation display (ND) of a Boeing 747-400 aircraft

The MFD (multi-function display) displays navigational and weather information from multiple systems. MFDs are most frequently designed as "chart-centric", where the aircrew can overlay different information over a map or chart. Examples of MFD overlay information include the aircraft's current route plan, weather information from either on-board radar or lightning detection sensors or ground-based sensors, e.g., NEXRAD, restricted airspace and aircraft traffic. The MFD can also be used to view other non-overlay data (e.g., current route plan) and calculated overlay-type data, e.g., the glide radius of the aircraft, given current location over terrain, winds, and aircraft speed and altitude.

MFDs can also display information about aircraft systems, such as fuel and electrical systems (see EICAS, below). As with the PFD, the MFD can change the color or shape of the data to alert the aircrew to hazardous situations.

=== Engine indications and crew alerting system (EICAS) / electronic centralized aircraft monitoring (ECAM) ===
EICAS (Engine Indications and Crew Alerting System) displays information about the aircraft's systems, including its fuel, electrical and propulsion systems (engines). EICAS displays are often designed to mimic traditional round gauges while also supplying digital readouts of the parameters.

EICAS improves situational awareness by allowing the aircrew to view complex information in a graphical format and also by alerting the crew to unusual or hazardous situations. For example, if an engine begins to lose oil pressure, the EICAS might sound an alert, switch the display to the page with the oil system information and outline the low oil pressure data with a red box. Unlike traditional round gauges, many levels of warnings and alarms can be set. Proper care must be taken when designing EICAS to ensure that the aircrew are always provided with the most important information and not overloaded with warnings or alarms.

ECAM is a similar system used by Airbus, which, in addition to providing EICAS functions, also recommend remedial action.

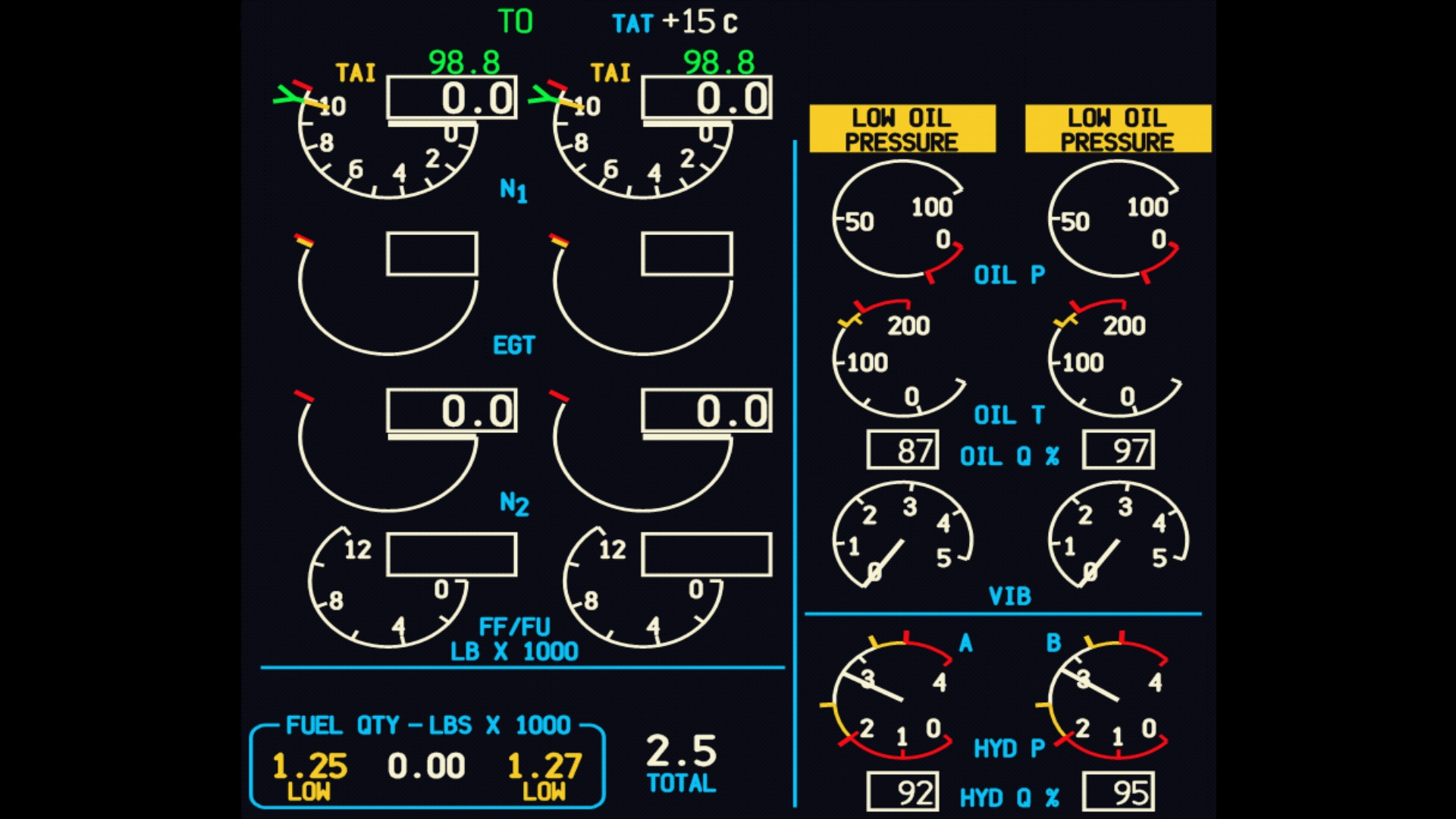
A 737NG EICAS after landing, showing outside air temperature, N1 RPM, exhaust gas temperature, N2 RPM, fuel flow, fuel used, fuel in the tanks, oil pressure, oil temperature, oil quantity, engine vibration, hydraulic pressure and hydraulic quantity

== Control panels ==
EFIS provides pilots with controls that select display range and mode (for example, map or compass rose) and enter data (such as selected heading).

Where other equipment uses pilot inputs, data buses broadcast the pilot's selections so that the pilot need only enter the selection once. For example, the pilot selects the desired level-off altitude on a control unit. The EFIS repeats this selected altitude on the PFD, and by comparing it with the actual altitude (from the air data computer) generates an altitude error display. This same altitude selection is used by the automatic flight control system to level off, and by the altitude alerting system to provide appropriate warnings.

== Data processors ==
The EFIS visual display is produced by the symbol generator. This receives data inputs from the pilot, signals from sensors, and EFIS format selections made by the pilot. The symbol generator can go by other names, such as display processing computer, display electronics unit, etc.

The symbol generator does more than generate symbols. It has (at the least) monitoring facilities, a graphics generator and a display driver. Inputs from sensors and controls arrive via data buses and are checked for validity. The required computations are performed, and the graphics generator and display driver produce the inputs to the display units.

=== Capabilities ===
Like personal computers, flight instrument systems need power-on-self-test facilities and continuous self-monitoring. Flight instrument systems, however, need additional monitoring capabilities:

- Input validation — verify that each sensor is providing valid data
- Data comparison — cross check inputs from duplicated sensors
- Display monitoring — detect failures within the instrument system

=== Former practice ===
Traditional (electromechanical) displays are equipped with synchro mechanisms that transmit the pitch, roll, and heading shown on the captain and first officer's instruments to an instrument comparator. The comparator warns of excessive differences between the captain and first officer displays. Even a fault as far downstream as a jam in, say, the roll mechanism of an ADI triggers a comparator warning. The instrument comparator thus provides both comparator monitoring and display monitoring.

=== Comparator monitoring ===
With EFIS, the comparator function is simple: Is roll data (bank angle) from sensor 1 the same as roll data from sensor 2? If not, display a warning caption (such as CHECK ROLL) on both PFDs. Comparison monitors give warnings for airspeed, pitch, roll, and altitude indications. More advanced EFIS systems have more comparator monitors.

=== Display monitoring ===
In this technique, each symbol generator contains two display monitoring channels. One channel, the internal, samples the output from its own symbol generator to the display unit and computes, for example, what roll attitude should produce that indication. This computed roll attitude is then compared with the roll attitude input to the symbol generator from the INS or AHRS. Any difference has probably been introduced by faulty processing and triggers a warning on the relevant display.

The external monitoring channel carries out the same check on the symbol generator on the other side of the flight deck: the Captain's symbol generator checks the First Officer's, the First Officer's checks the Captain's. Whichever symbol generator detects a fault, puts up a warning on its own display.

The external monitoring channel also checks sensor inputs (to the symbol generator) for reasonableness. A spurious input, such as a radio height greater than the radio altimeter's maximum, results in a warning.

== Human factors ==
=== Clutter ===
At various stages of a flight, a pilot needs different combinations of data. Ideally, the avionics only show the data in use—but an electromechanical instrument must be in view all the time. To improve display clarity, ADIs and HSIs use intricate mechanisms to remove superfluous indications temporarily—e.g., removing the glide slope scale when the pilot doesn't need it.

Under normal conditions, an EFIS might not display some indications, e.g., engine vibration. Only when some parameter exceeds its limits does the system display the reading. In similar fashion, EFIS is programmed to show the glideslope scale and pointer only during an ILS approach.

In the case of an input failure, an electromechanical instrument adds yet another indicator—typically, a bar drops across the erroneous data. EFIS, on the other hand, removes invalid data from the display and substitutes an appropriate warning.

A de-clutter mode activates automatically when circumstances require the pilot's attention for a specific item. For example, if the aircraft pitches up or down beyond a specified limit—usually 30 to 60 degrees—the attitude indicator de-clutters other items from sight until the pilot brings the pitch to an acceptable level. This helps the pilot focus on the most important tasks.

=== Color ===
Traditional instruments have long used color, but lack the ability to change a color to indicate some change in condition. The electronic display technology of EFIS has no such restriction and uses color widely. For example, as an aircraft approaches the glide slope, a blue caption can indicate glide slope is armed, and capture might change the color to green. Typical EFIS systems color code the navigation needles to reflect the type of navigation. Green needles indicate ground-based navigation, such as VORs, Localizers and ILS systems. Magenta needles indicate GPS navigation.

== Advantages ==
EFIS provides versatility by avoiding some physical limitations of traditional instruments. A pilot can switch the same display that shows a course deviation indicator to show the planned track provided by an area navigation or flight management system. Pilots can choose to superimpose the weather radar picture on the displayed route.

The flexibility afforded by software modifications minimises the costs of responding to new aircraft regulations and equipment. Software updates can update an EFIS system to extend its capabilities. Updates introduced in the 1990s included the ground proximity warning system and traffic collision avoidance system.

A degree of redundancy is available even with the simple two-screen EFIS installation. Should the PFD fail, transfer switching repositions its vital information to the screen normally occupied by the navigation display.

== Advances in EFIS ==
In the late 1980s, EFIS became standard equipment on most Boeing and Airbus airliners, and many business aircraft adopted EFIS in the 1990s.

Recent advances in computing power and reductions in the cost of liquid-crystal displays and navigational sensors (such as GPS and attitude and heading reference system) have brought EFIS to general aviation aircraft. Notable examples are the Garmin G1000 and Chelton Flight Systems EFIS-SV.

Several EFIS manufacturers have focused on the experimental aircraft market, producing EFIS and EICAS systems for as little as US$1,000-2000. The low cost is possible because of steep drops in the price of sensors and displays, and equipment for experimental aircraft doesn't require expensive Federal Aviation Administration certification. This latter point restricts their use to experimental aircraft and certain other aircraft categories, depending on local regulations. Uncertified EFIS systems are also found in Light-sport aircraft, including factory built, microlight, and ultralight aircraft. These systems can be fitted to certified aircraft in some cases as secondary or backup systems depending on local aviation rules.

== See also ==
- Index of aviation articles
- Acronyms and abbreviations in avionics
