= Sargent Fletcher =

American manufacturer of aircraft equipment

- Industry: Aerospace
- Predecessor: Fletcher Aviation
- Founded: 1940
- Headquarters: 9400 Flair Dr. El Monte, California, USA
- Key people: Ron Winkler, VP
- Number of employees: 150 (2010)
- Website: www.cobham.com

Sargent Fletcher is a subsidiary company of Cobham plc. which makes aircraft equipment, including aerial refueling systems, external fuel tanks, and special purpose pods.

== History ==
Sargent-Fletcher Company was created by A. J. Industries decision to merge the Sargent Engineering Corporation and Fletcher Aviation Corporation in June 1963. It had acquired the former in late 1961 and the latter in October 1958. Sargent-Fletcher was bought by Cobham in 1994.

According to a 1991 report the company submitted to regional air quality officials, the company's El Monte chrome-plating plant showed the highest cancer-risk level of any business in the San Gabriel Valley. It was later closed in 2010.

== Customers ==
The KC-130J was supposed to be equipped with Flight Refuelling Ltd's Mk32B-901E hose-and-drogue units, but operational problems meant that the aircraft went into production using equipment from Sargent Fletcher instead.

Aircraft using Sargent Fletcher equipment include:

- Boeing 707
- Dassault Mirage 5
- Douglas A-4 Skyhawk
- Lockheed Martin F-16 Fighting Falcon
- Lockheed Martin F-22 Raptor
- Lockheed C-130 Hercules / HC-130 / KC-130 / MC-130
- Lockheed L-1011 TriStar
- McDonnell Douglas F-15 Eagle
- McDonnell Douglas F/A-18 Hornet
- McDonnell Douglas KC-10A
- Northrop F-5
- Panavia Tornado
