= DRS RQ-15 Neptune =

American unmanned flying boat

RQ-15 Neptune
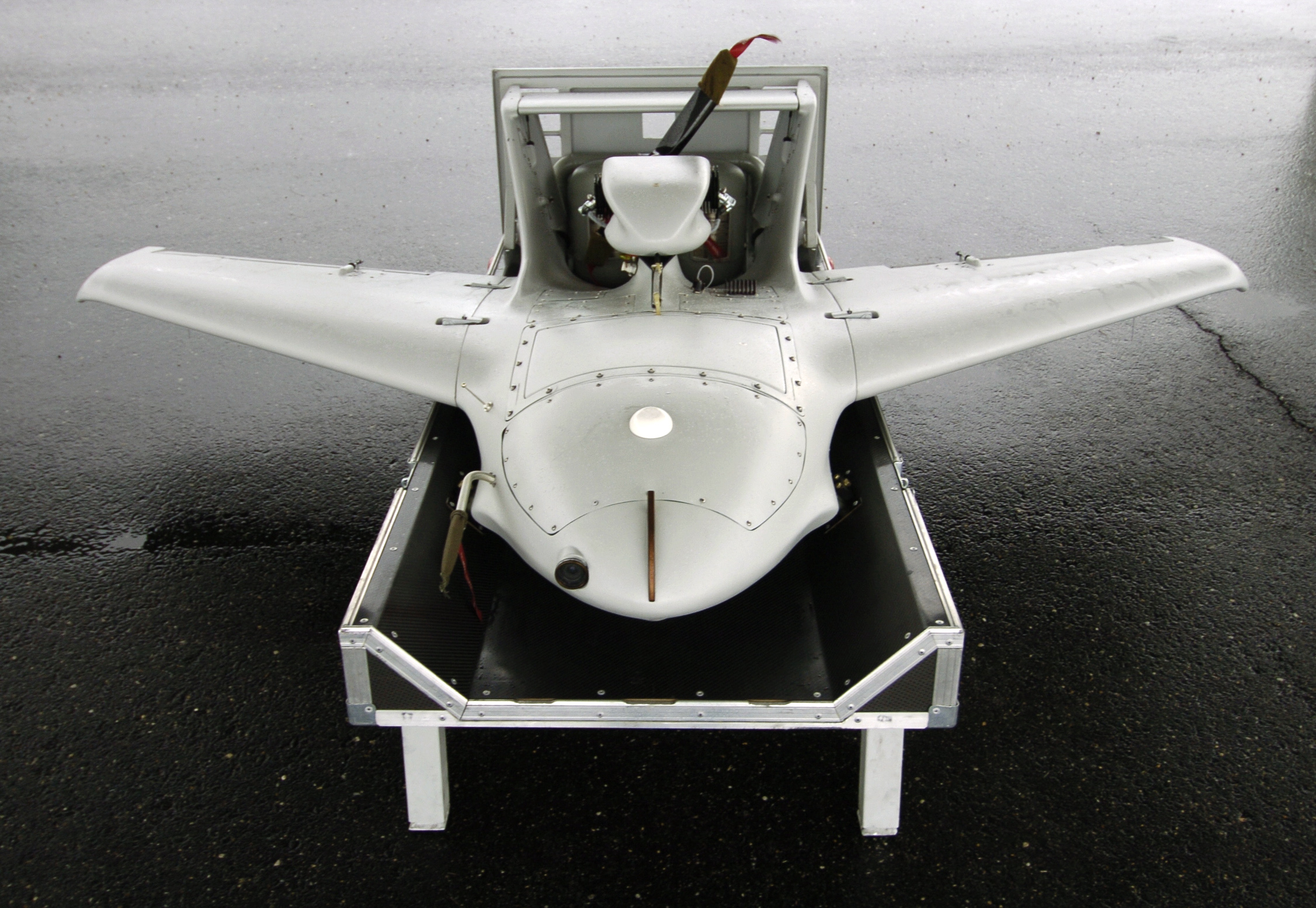
- RQ-15 on display at a 2005 Naval UAV Air Demo

General information
- Type: Maritime reconnaissance UAV
- National origin: United States
- Manufacturer: DRS
- Status: Active
- Primary user: United States Navy

History
- First flight: January 2002

The DRS RQ-15 Neptune is a reconnaissance UAV developed in the United States in the early years of the 21st century. The design is optimized for operations over water, and is capable of water landings on its flying boat–like hull. The 11.2 kW (15 hp) pusher engine is mounted high to keep it dry during takeoffs and landings. The Neptune can also be launched off a pneumatic catapult and land on a skid. In 2007, one was unsuccessfully launched off the USS Nashville (LPD-13), crashing into the water less than two seconds after lift off.

== Specifications ==
Data from Unmanned Aircraft Systems Roadmap 2005–2030, Office of the Secretary of Defense (p.20)

General characteristics

- Crew: None
- Capacity: 20 lb (9 kg) payload
- Length: 6 ft 0 in (1.83 m)
- Wingspan: 7 ft 0 in (2.13 m)
- Gross weight: 80 lb (36 kg)
- Fuel capacity: 18 pounds (8.2 kg)
- Powerplant: 1 × two-stroke engine piston engine , 15 hp (11 kW)

Performance

- Maximum speed: 100 mph (160 km/h, 87 kn)
- Endurance: 4 hours
- Service ceiling: 8,000 ft (2,400 m)

== Design ==
The most remarkable design element is the double vertical stabilizer with the piston engine housed in between. This arrangement reduces the infrared signature from the side-to-rear view.
