= Fletcher BG-2 =

Bomber glider

BG-2
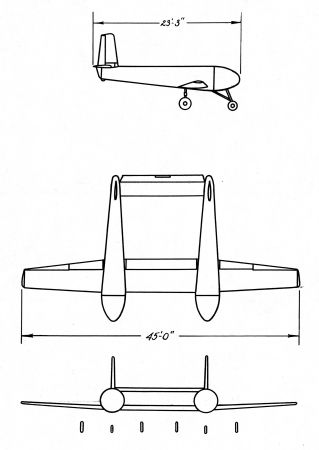
- 3-view drawing of the Fletcher XBG-2

General information
- Type: Bomb glider
- Manufacturer: Fletcher Aviation
- Designer: Wendell Fletcher
- Status: cancelled
- Primary user: United States Army Air Forces
- Number built: 0

History
- First flight: never built

The Fletcher BG-2 was a proposed American bomb glider designed by Fletcher Aviation in World War II.

== Design ==
The XBG-2 (Model 16) was conceived by the Fletcher company as a wooden bomb-carrying glider as a derivative of its earlier BG-1, in turn based on the company's YCQ-1 drone control plane (a conversion of its unsuccessful FBT-2 trainer). It was to use two fuselages and outer wing panels of the BG-1 joined by a new wing center section and a horizontal tailplane connecting the two vertical fins, as well as a TV fairing under the inboard wing on the centerline or in the starboard fuselage nose. The main landing gear was supported by four main gear struts, and each fuselage would have housed a 2,000-pound bomb.

Three XBG-2s (serials 42-46902/4) were ordered by the USAAF in April 1942. (Note: Andrade (1979, pp. 59, 96) states that the XBG-2s on contract were originally ordered as a production batch of the Frankfort CG-1; however, Andreas Parsch notes that Andrade's mention of the XBG-2 bomb gliders being originally ordered as CG-1s is due to a Q→G typo in CQ-1, since Norton (2008) points out that the BG-2, like the BG-1, was derived from the CQ-1 drone controller plane.) However, when flight characteristics of the BG-1 turned out to be unsatisfactory, on September 8, 1942, the BG-2 contract was cancelled without any completed.

== Specifications ==
Data from

General characteristics

- Crew: 0
- Length: 23.3 ft (7.1 m)
- Wingspan: 45.0 ft (13.7 m)
- Wing area: 208 sq ft (19.3 m^{2})
- Empty weight: 2,431 lb (1,103 kg)
- Gross weight: 6,531 lb (2,962 kg)

Performance

- Stall speed: 84 mph (135 km/h, 73 kn)
- Maximum glide ratio: 10.9:1

Armament

- Bombs: 2x 2,000 lb bombs
