= Pratt, Read and Company Factory Complex =

- U.S. National Register of Historic Places
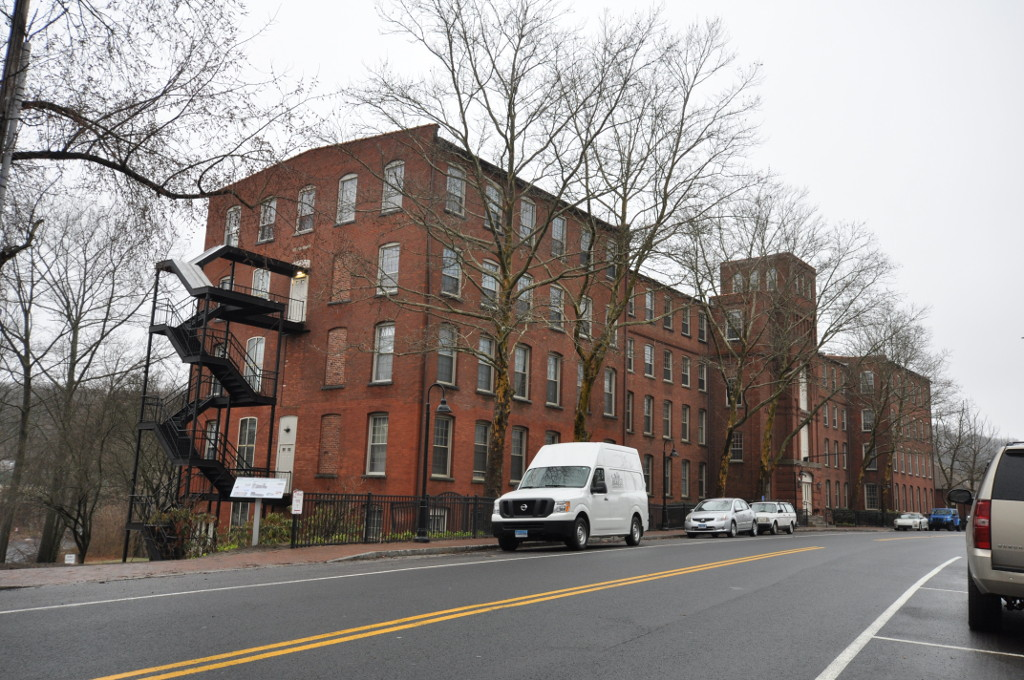

- Location within Connecticut Location within the United States
- Location: Main Street between Bridge and Spring Streets and 5 Bridge Street, Deep River, Connecticut
- Coordinates: 41°23′25″N 72°26′22″W
- Area: 9.5 acres (3.8 ha)
- Built: 1881
- Architect: Williams, Charles M.; Ford, Buck & Sheldon
- Architectural style: Colonial Revival, Romanesque
- NRHP reference No.: 84001117
- Added to NRHP: August 30, 1984

The Pratt, Read and Company Factory Complex is an historic industrial facility located in Deep River, Connecticut. Established in 1863 by Pratt-Read and significantly enlarged in 1914, it was one of the principal sites of ivory processing in Connecticut, producing combs, buttons, and piano keys. The complex was listed on the National Register of Historic Places on August 30, 1984. It has been converted to residences.

== Description and history ==
The former Pratt, Read factory consists of two clusters of mainly brick buildings lining the Deep River north of the town center, west of Main Street and bounded on the north by Spring Street and on the south by Bridge Street. The main building of the complex is set close to Main Street, rising five stories, with an architecturally elaborate entry tower near its center. Wings extend from this building toward the river. The second complex stands across the river, and is dominated by a four-story concrete building.

The eastern half of the complex was developed by the Pratt-Read Company beginning in 1863, although no buildings survive that predate 1881. George Read first began processing ivory in this area in 1809, which were taken over by Pratt, Read in 1863. The older buildings were all destroyed by fire in 1881, with the present main structure built immediately after the fire. These facilities were used to process ivory, notably for combs, buttons, and piano keys, and eventually entire piano keyboard actions. In 1914 the company expanded on the western bank of the river, developing the complex that stands off Bridge Street. It was one of the works of a pioneer of the use of reinforced concrete in factory construction, Ernest J. Ransome.

== See also ==
- National Register of Historic Places listings in Middlesex County, Connecticut
