= Fletcher FL-23 =

General information
- Type: Two-seat liaison/observation aircraft
- Manufacturer: Fletcher Aviation Corporation
- Number built: 1

History
- First flight: 1950

The Fletcher FL-23 was an American two-seat liaison or observation aircraft designed and built by the California-based Fletcher Aviation Corporation. It was entered into a competition and lost against the Cessna 305A as a liaison or observation aircraft for the United States Army.

== Development ==
The FL-23 prototype was designed and built as a private venture, it was a high-wing cantilever monoplane with an all-moving tailplane mounted at the top of the fin. It had a fixed tricycle landing gear and powered a 225-hp (168 kW) Continental E225 piston engine. It had room for a pilot and observer in tandem; the observer had an unusual acrylic plastic enclosure to give an all-round visibility.

== Operational history ==
The US Army issued the specification for a two-seat liaison and observation monoplane and the prototype was entered into the competition. During trials the aircraft was badly damaged in a flying accident when it lost its tail, and was withdrawn from the competition. The competition was won by the Cessna 305A which became the L-19 Bird Dog.

== Specifications ==
Data from Jane's All The World's Aircraft 1951–52

General characteristics

- Crew: 2
- Length: 28 ft 4 in (8.64 m)
- Wingspan: 33 ft 4 in (10.16 m)
- Height: 8 ft 1 in (2.46 m)
- Wing area: 277 sq ft (25.7 m^{2})
- Airfoil: NACA 4412
- Empty weight: 1,500 lb (680 kg)
- Gross weight: 2,450 lb (1,111 kg)
- Fuel capacity: 60 US gal (50 imp gal; 230 L)
- Powerplant: 1 × Continental E225 air-cooled flat-six, 235 hp (175 kW)
- Propellers: Hartzell
- Propellers: 7 ft (2.1 m) diameter

Performance

- Maximum speed: 133 mph (214 km/h, 116 kn)
- Cruise speed: 118 mph (190 km/h, 103 kn)
- Stall speed: 38 mph (61 km/h, 33 kn) (flaps extended)
- Range: 485 mi (781 km, 421 nmi)
- Service ceiling: 19,500 ft (5,900 m)
- Rate of climb: 1,180 ft/min (6.0 m/s)

== See also ==
Aircraft of comparable role, configuration, and era

- O-1 Bird Dog
