= Pratt-Read TG-32 =

TG-32/LNE-1
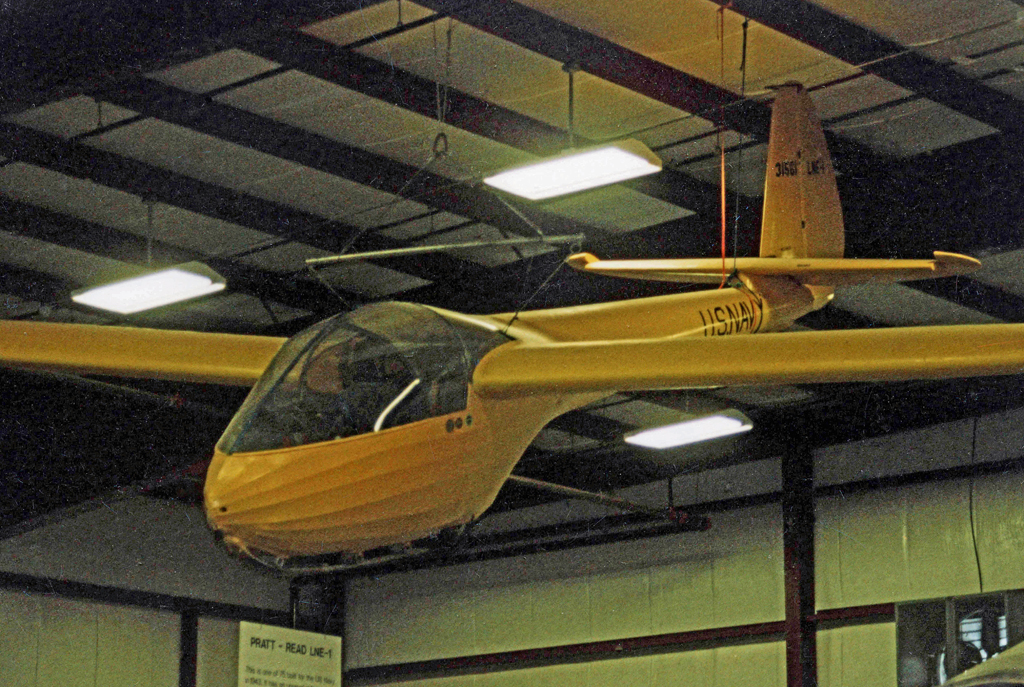
- US Navy LNE-1 exhibited at the New England Air Museum wearing WW2 color scheme

General information
- Type: Training glider
- National origin: United States
- Manufacturer: Pratt, Read & Company
- Designer: Charles Ludington
- Primary user: United States Navy/Marine Corps.
- Number built: 75

History
- Introduction date: 1940s
- First flight: March 1942 piloted by Emil Lehecka

The Pratt-Read TG-32 is a 1940s American military training glider, designed and built by the Gould Aeronautical Division of the piano manufacturer Pratt, Read & Company of Deep River, Connecticut, for the United States Navy. The Pratt-Read glider was a monoplane glider having a fabric-covered steel tube fuselage and wooden wings and tail. The unique "polywog (tadpole)" shape was the suggestion of aerodynamicist Charles Townsend Ludington, former owner of the Ludington Line.

== Development ==
The Pratt-Read PR-G1 was initially designed as a speculative effort to meet a United States pilot training program requirement that Charles Townsend Ludington and Roger Griswold II saw a need for when asked by James A. Gould, president of Pratt, Read & Company, as to what Pratt-Read could do to contribute to the war effort that was seen to be eminent. The civilian registered NX41802 two-seat side-by-side glider was built with the Army in mind and not the Navy. The completed glider was demonstrated before Army and Navy representatives, but the Army already had several contracts with other training glider manufacturers. The Navy was actually interested in the Schweizer two-seat glider as a trainer, but knew the Army had a contract with them and felt that this would delay production for the Navy. The Navy purchased NX41802 and gave it designation XLNE-1, serial number 31505. It was thoroughly tested and evaluated at the Naval Aircraft Factory (NAF) in Philadelphia where it passed its acceptance testing. A production contract for 100 LNE-1 gliders was entered into that were to be used for the training of the Marine Corps glider pilots (all Marine Corps glider pilots were rated Naval Aviation Pilots) for the Pacific campaign.

The first of these contracted production gliders, serial number 31506 was also given the designation of XLNE-1, thus two training gliders had the same XLNE-1 designation and often confuse researchers and historians. It too had to pass evaluation by the Navy. NX41802, Navy XLNE-1 #31505, was returned to Pratt-Read where it underwent destructive testing and was destroyed. When the Navy began to question the effectiveness of a glider assault in the Pacific theater, the original order for 100 gliders was amended and reduced to 75. The short lived Marine glider program was cancelled before any LNE-1's were ever delivered to the unit.

When the decision was made not to use gliders in the Pacific campaign, 73 of the Navy aircraft were transferred to the United States Army Air Forces in exchange for two Pratt-Read manufactured CG-4A Army gliders which the Navy had been experimenting with. The LNE-1 gliders were then given the AAF designation of TG-32. The Air Force did not use the gliders and they were stored until the end of the war and were sold on the civilian market.

Following the war, three Pratt-Read gliders were used in a joint venture of four federal agencies to study severe flying weather. The ventured was called the Thunderstorm Project. In the 1950s the glider was used in a high altitude weather and flight condition investigation called the Sierra Wave project. In 1952 a TG-32 set a new world altitude record of 44,255 ft (13,489 m) for two-seat gliders, a record held for 54 years. The altitude gain of 34,426 ft (10,493 m)achieved on this flight has only recently been superseded by the Perlan Project

== Variants ==
PR-G1
Company designation, one prototype built with Naval designation XLNE-1.
LNE-1
United States Navy designation, 75 built to include 1 XLNE-1.
TG-32
United States Army Air Forces designation for 73 gliders transferred from the Navy.

Two gliders, #31506 and #31507 were kept by the Navy for further testing.

== Operators ==
United States

- United States Army Air Forces
- United States Navy

== Aircraft on display ==
A number of TG-32 and LNE-1 gliders are on public display in museums in the United States.

- 31518 – LNE-1 on static display at the Museum of Flight in Seattle, Washington.
- 31523 – TG-32 in storage at the National Museum of the United States Air Force in Dayton, Ohio.
- 31537 – LNE-1 on display at the Hoosier Air Museum in Auburn, Indiana.
- 31540 – LNE-1 in storage at the Southern Museum of Flight in Birmingham, Alabama. It is on loan from the National Naval Aviation Museum.
- 31561 – LNE-1 on static display at the New England Air Museum in Windsor Locks, Connecticut. It is on loan from the National Soaring Museum.

== Specifications ==
Data from

General characteristics

- Crew: 2
- Length: 26 ft 3 in (8.00 m)
- Wingspan: 54 ft 6 in (16.61 m)
- Height: 6 ft (1.8 m)
- Wing area: 230 sq ft (21 m^{2})
- Empty weight: 585 lb (265 kg)
- Max takeoff weight: 1,000 lb (454 kg)

Performance

- Maximum speed: 99 mph (159 km/h, 86 kn) dive or glide speed

== See also ==
Related lists

- List of gliders

== Bibliography ==
- Andrade, John (1979). U.S.Military Aircraft Designations and Serials since 1909. Midland Counties Publications. ISBN 0-904597-22-9.
- Ogden, Bob (2007). Aviation Museums and Collections of North America. Tonbridge, Kent: Air-Britain (Historians) Ltd. ISBN 0-85130-385-4.
