= CUMA =

Canadian military diving rebreather

CUMA (Canadian Underwater Mine-countermeasure Apparatus) (commercially called SIVA+) is a make of rebreather underwater breathing set designed and made in Canada for the Canadian Armed Forces by Fullerton Sherwood Engineering Ltd to replace the Royal Navy CDBA.

The unit consists of a back mounted casing, containing its: carbon dioxide scrubber, oxygen supply, diluent supply (both spherical flasks), a mechanical ratio regulator, electronic PPO2 monitoring, and all of the valves and fittings. The remainder of the breathing loop consists of a pair of chest mounted counter lungs connected by the usual loop of wide corrugated breathing tubes running from and to the top of the backpack. It has a small bailout cylinder horizontally across the bottom of the backpack casing which is plumbed directly into the divers breathing loop.

It is a self-mixing semi closed circuit rebreather (SCR). A constant flow of oxygen is mixed with a diluent volume dependent on the ambient pressure. The deeper the diver dives, the more diluent is added, and thus the leaner the supplied breathing mix. The correct oxygen setpoint is monitored electronically and alerts the diver via a heads-up-display (HUD) if it is not being correctly maintained. The CUMA is capable for diving to a depth of 90 meters (295 feet) or a maximum working pressure of 10 ATA. It can be calibrated for the use of different diluents such as: air, trimix, heliox, or pure helium.

Its first prototype set was made in March 1987.

== See also ==
- Diving rebreather – Closed or semi-closed circuit scuba
- Cobham (company) – British defense industry manufacturing company
