= Pratt-Read LBE =

LBE-1
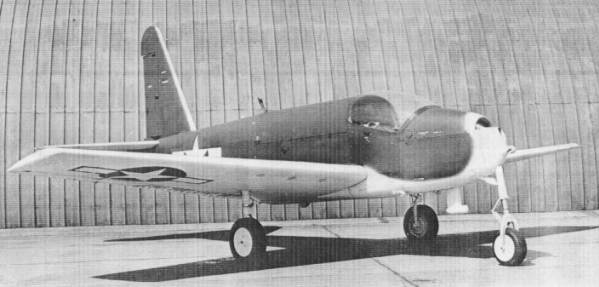

General information
- Type: Glider bomb
- Manufacturer: Pratt-Read
- Primary user: United States Navy
- Number built: 4

The Pratt-Read LBE-1 was a prototype glide bomb, or "Glomb", developed for the United States Navy during World War II. Although there were high hopes for the concept, the limitations of the Glomb led to the production contract for the LBE-1 being reduced, then cancelled, and only four examples of the type were ever built.

== Design and development ==
Late in 1940, the United States Navy began seriously considering the possibility of developing gliders that would be remotely controlled to carry bombs to a target, reducing the risk to aircrew. The concept called for the glider to be towed by an ordinary carrier-based aircraft to the target area, then released, to be guided via a TV camera in the glider's nose which would transmit signals to the carrier aircraft, an operator then using radio control to steer the aircraft to its target. Considered to be feasible, the project, called "Glomb" for "Glider-Bomb", became an official program in the late spring of 1941.

Following trials using conversions of existing gliders that proved the concept viable, Pratt-Read was awarded a contract in September 1943 for the development of a purpose-built Glomb, designated by the navy as LBE-1. Intended to carry between 2,000 and 4,000 pounds (910–1,800 kg) of bombs, the LBE-1 was a fairly conventional low-wing aircraft, fitted with fixed tricycle landing gear and perforated dive brakes of the type used by dive-bombers. In addition to its radio-command guidance, the LBE-1 could be flown by a pilot for training and evaluation.

== Operational history ==
Although the initial contract called for the production of 100 examples of the LBE-1, continued trials of the Glomb showed that the combination of the glider's low performance and technical issues with the intended television guidance system made the concept operationally unworkable; accordingly, the contract was reduced to only 35 aircraft in early 1945. In August 1945, with the end of World War II, the contract for production was cancelled entirely; only four LBE-1s would be completed, being used only for evaluation purposes.

== Specifications (LBE-1) ==
Data from

General characteristics

- Crew: One (optional)
- Length: 29 ft 1.5 in (8.877 m)
- Wingspan: 32 ft 6 in (9.91 m)
- Wing area: 202 sq ft (18.8 m^{2})
- Gross weight: 7,138 lb (3,238 kg)

Performance

- Maximum speed: 300 mph (480 km/h, 260 kn) in dive

Armament

- Bombs: 2,000 to 4,000 pounds (910 to 1,810 kg)

== See also ==
- ASM-N-2 Bat

Related development

- Piper LBP
- Taylorcraft LBT

Aircraft of comparable role, configuration, and era

- Cornelius XBG-3
- Fletcher FBT-2

Related lists

- List of United States Navy aircraft designations (pre-1962)
- List of unmanned aerial vehicles
