= Cornelius XBG-3 =

American bomb glider project

XBG-3

General information
- Type: Bomb glider
- Manufacturer: Cornelius Aircraft
- Primary user: United States Army Air Forces
- Number built: 0
- Serial: 42-46911

The Cornelius XBG-3 was an American "bomb glider", developed by the Cornelius Aircraft Corporation for the United States Army Air Forces. Using an unconventional design that included a forward-swept wing, a single prototype was ordered in 1942; however the contract was cancelled later that year before the aircraft had been constructed.

== History ==
Early in World War II, the United States Army Air Forces initiated research into the possibility that gliders, towed by other, conventional aircraft to the area of a target, then released and guided to impact via radio control, could be a useful weapon of war. Essentially an early form of (very large) guided missile, the concept was similar to a Navy project underway at the same time, known as Glomb (from "glider-bomb"), and led to the establishment of the 'BG' series of designations, for 'Bomb Glider', in early 1942.

Among the designs considered for use as a bomb glider was an unconventional design submitted by the Cornelius Aircraft Company. Cornelius, having established a reputation for unconventional aircraft designs, proposed a design that featured a "tail-first" configuration, with canard foreplanes and a radical forward-swept wing. The USAAF considered the design interesting enough to award a contract to Cornelius for the construction of a single prototype, designated XBG-3. However the project was cancelled in late 1942, when the bomb glider concept was abandoned by the USAAF.

An enlarged, tailless, forward-swept wing glider would be built by Cornelius later in the war, acting as a "flying fuel tank" for long-range bombers, as the XFG-1.

== See also ==
- ASM-N-2 Bat

Related development

- Cornelius XFG-1

Aircraft of comparable role, configuration, and era

- Fletcher BG-1
- Interstate TDR
- Mistel
- Pratt-Read LBE

Related lists

- List of military aircraft of the United States
