= Chelton Flight Systems =

American avionics manufacturer

- Company type: Private
- Industry: Aerospace
- Founded: 1997
- Headquarters: Boise, Idaho, USA
- Key people: Gordon Pratt, President
- Products: Avionics
- Parent: Genesys Aerosystems
- Website: www.cheltonflightsystems.com

Chelton Flight Systems designs and manufactures advanced avionics and flight controls. Based in Boise, Idaho, Chelton Flight Systems originally started out as Sierra Flight Systems. The company was co-founded by Gordon Pratt and Rick Price in 1997. It is part of Genesys Aerosystems since 2014.

== History ==
- April, 2014 - Genesys Aerosystems acquired Chelton Flight Systems and S-TEC Corporation.
- November 10, 2006 - CFS was granted FAA STC approval of the EFIS in the Eurocopter EC 120B helicopter.
- September 21, 2006 - CFS was chosen to supply the EFIS for MD Helicopters' light singles program.
- 2006 - CFS joins GlobalFlyer in the Smithsonian Air and Space Museum.
- April 30, 2006 - The M28 Sky Truck from Landmark Aviation delivered its first CFS EFIS equipped aircraft.
- June, 2001 - Cobham plc acquired Sierra Flight Systems and renamed the company Chelton Flight Systems.
- 1997 - CFS founded.

A tragic accident on October 15, 2002 claimed the lives of two Chelton Flight Systems employees and seriously injured a third. The accident occurred when their aircraft struck trees while landing at a private airstrip near Coeur d'Alene, Idaho, in clear conditions. The pilot, Grant Bailey, and the rear passenger, Barry Boepple, were killed instantly. Nate Calvin, Vice President of Engineering, was thrown clear of the wreckage and received a broken leg and several lacerations.

== System overview ==
Their aim was to provide a safer way to fly by reducing the number of accidents. This was achieved through enhancing situational awareness with real-time 3-D Synthetic vision, which shows where the plane is headed. Synthetic Vision allows the pilot to see at night or in inclement weather. A Terrain Awareness and Warning System (TAWS) was created which alerts the pilot when he is flying too low. Software was also developed that calculates real-time fuel consumption data; so the pilot knows how much fuel is left to burn. The system employs a Highway-In-The-Sky approach, HITS creates a virtual 3-D tunnel which is flown through. The single display integrates many stand alone instruments to provide the operator with information immediately. FlightLogic Electronic Flight Information Systems (EFIS) has a supplemental type certificate (STC) on over 740 aircraft.

== Design concepts ==
Chelton Flight Systems uses a two-display setup to bring the glass cockpit to general aviation. One display is the primary flight display (PFD). A PFD is defined as a display that provides all the information necessary for a pilot to control the aircraft. This includes pitch, roll, heading, altitude, airspeed and vertical speed information. In essence, the "six pack". A multi-function display (MFD) displays supplementary information. The difference between the PFD and MFD is that the MFD has a satellites view of the world. The terrain awareness and warning system is a very useful feature that has visual and auditory cues to alert the pilot of obstacles or terrain in the flight path. Traditionally the TAWS is a separate unit, however CFS has integrated it into their displays. This is the same for the Flight Management System. The FMS is also included in the display unit. The FMS is a complete navigation system providing all ARINC 424 leg types with a Jeppesen database. Instrument approaches, waypoints, and high and low victor airways are part of the FMS.

== Customers ==
- The Virgin Atlantic GlobalFlyer, flown by Steve Fosset.
- NASCAR team Evernham Motorsports.
- Bell and Eurocopter have installed the system on a few of their helicopter models.
- Eclipse Aviation will be using a Chelton Flight management system for the Eclipse 500
