= Glomb =

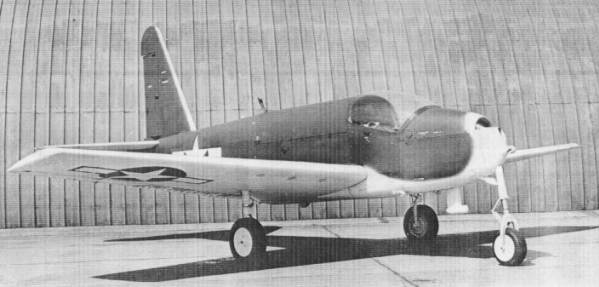
- Pratt-Read LBE-1 Glomb
- Type: Glide bomb
- Place of origin: United States

Service history
- In service: 1944–1945
- Used by: United States Navy
- Wars: World War II (test only)

Glomb, from "glide bomb", was a project undertaken by the United States Navy during World War II to develop an unmanned aircraft for delivering bombs to high-value, well-protected targets without risk to aircrew. The project proceeded through the war, producing several prototype aircraft, but technical limitations meant no Glombs saw operational service and the program was cancelled at the end of the war.

== Design history ==
During late 1940, the United States Navy began studying the possibility of developing gliders that would be remotely controlled to carry bombs to a target, reducing the risk to aircrew. In 1941, the Joint Air Advisory Committee approved the creation of the Glomb project, recommending that the project be conducted as a joint effort between the War Department and Navy Department. On 19 April the Navy's Bureau of Aeronautics officially initiated a project office at the Naval Aircraft Factory (NAF) for development of an operational glide bomb.

In 1942, a defined specification was prepared for a series of glider aircraft capable of carrying either 18,000 pounds (8,200 kg) of explosives or 3,000 US gallons (11,000 L; 2,500 imp gal) of fuel in a tanker configuration; by 1944, when such an aircraft was able to be built, the course of the war meant that such a large aircraft was no longer needed. However a project for a smaller glide bomb, based on a modified production glider, was underway, with tests of radio command guidance being undertaken using modified training gliders, starting in September 1942.

The Taylorcraft XLNT-1, Piper XLNP-1, Aeronca XLNR-1, and Waco XLRW-1 were evaluated under Project George, with the Taylorcraft model, designated XLNT-2 in definitive Glomb form, being considered the most suitable. It was modified with a tricycle undercarriage to allow for ease of towing during takeoff, and television guidance was used, the only form of guidance that was sufficiently reliable given the state of the art at the time; a payload of up to 4,000 pounds (1,800 kg) could be carried.

The results of the trials were considered sufficiently satisfactory for specifications for a production Glomb to be produced by the Naval Aircraft Factory and released to manufacturers for proposals in August 1943.

== Developmental testing ==
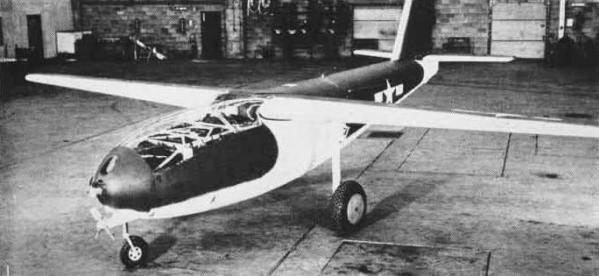
Piper LBP-1 Glomb

The specifications produced by the NAF called for a payload of 4,000 pounds (1,800 kg) to be carried by the definitive Glomb, with a radius of action of 350 nautical miles (400 mi; 650 km); the towing aircraft specified as a baseline was the Grumman F6F Hellcat. In September, contracts were awarded to Pratt-Read, Piper Aircraft, and Taylorcraft Aircraft for production of the LBE, LBP, and LBT, respectively, for 100 aircraft of each type.

In September 1944, the first full, expendable tests of the XLNT Glomb were conducted; three aircraft being authorized for use. While the aerodynamics and effects of the Glomb were considered satisfactory by the Navy, the guidance system was not, and work on an improved guidance system was undertaken. In addition, studies for the carriage of Glombs on aircraft carriers were carried out, but this concept was dropped as no longer needed by the fall of 1944.

Continued issues with the guidance system, difficulty of generating electricity to power the onboard systems of the glider, and the changing state of the war, combined with the overall low performance inherent in a glider, led to the program being reduced in 1944; the LBT was cancelled outright in October, after production of only 25 aircraft, while orders for the LBE and LBP were reduced first to 85 aircraft in November 1944, then to 35 each in February 1945. Handling issues while landing resulted in the cancellation of the LBP in June 1945, and on 14 August, an analysis of the project resulted in the termination of the LBE, the sole remaining Glomb, with only four aircraft having been delivered. Work on the LBD Gargoyle missile, which had been developed as an offshoot of the Glomb program, continued, as it was considered more suitable for use by carrier aircraft and required less disruption to incorporate into Navy operations.
