= AN/SQR-17 =

AN/SQR-17 is a passive submarine detection system developed by Diagnostic/Retrieval Systems, Inc (now Leonardo DRS) for the US Navy and is still used today. It is a four channel low frequency spectrum analyzer that processes analog sonobuoy audio via a receiver linked to a Light Airborne Multi-Purpose System (LAMPS) helicopter. It at one time was deployed on more ships than any other passive sonar system.

In accordance with the Joint Electronics Type Designation System (JETDS), the "AN/SQR-17" designation represents the 17th design of an Army-Navy electronic device for surface ship passive sonar receiving system. The JETDS system also now is used to name all Department of Defense electronic systems.

== See also ==
- List of military electronics of the United States
