= Cobham Limited =

British defense industry manufacturing company

- Formerly: Flight Refuelling Limited
- Type: Private
- Industry: Aerospace, defence
- Founded: 1934; 92 years ago
- Headquarters: Bournemouth, England, UK
- Revenue: 1,590,000,000 United States dollar (2018)
- Owner: Advent International
- Website: cobhamultra.com

Cobham Limited is a British aerospace manufacturing company based in Bournemouth, England. Founded by Sir Alan Cobham as Flight Refuelling Limited (FRL) in 1934, the company has since grown and diversified into various markets through its acquisitions.

During 1994, the firm was formally renamed Cobham plc; by this point, the company had in excess of 10,000 employees and had operations in North America, Europe, Malaysia and South Africa. In January 2020, the company was acquired by American private equity firm Advent International for £4 billion, and Cobham Mission Systems, its aerial refuelling wing, was sold to Eaton in June 2021 for $2.83 billion.

== History ==
=== 1930s to 1990s: Formation, early activities and growth ===
During the 1920s and 1930s, aerial refuelling of aircraft in mid-flight was performed only on an experimental basis, typically for attempts to set new flight endurance records. During this era, Alan Cobham became an accomplished pilot, winning multiple air races as well as the de Havilland aircraft company appointing him as their senior pilot. Cobham decided to leave de Havilland to pursue his own ventures, including the formation of an aerobatic troupe and a small airline; he embarked on a long term campaign to popularize commercial air travel, making efforts to secure both public and the British Government's backing for the sector.

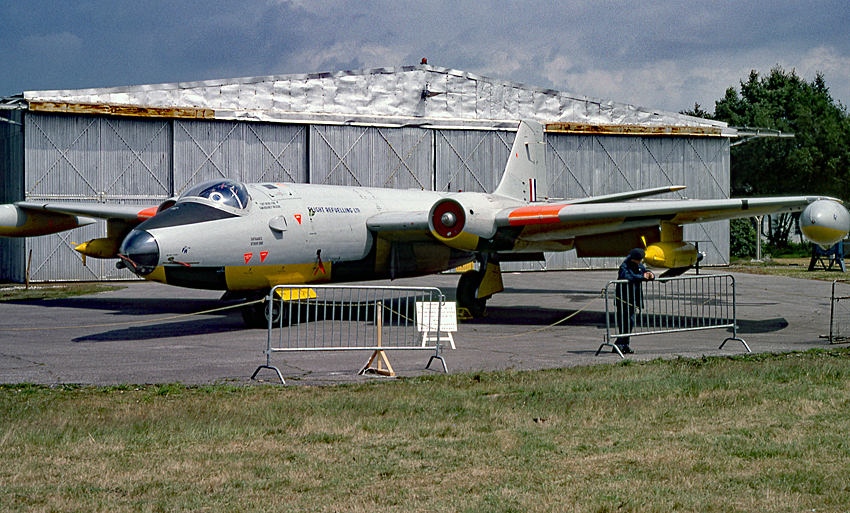
English Electric Canberra of Flight Refuelling Ltd

Cobham believed that practical in-flight refuelling techniques would revolutionise commercial airlines and enable new long distance air routes; however, development work later focused largely upon its military applications. He founded a new company, known as Flight Refuelling Limited (FRL), in 1934 that was initially headquartered at RAF Ford in Sussex.

During 1939, the company played a role in several non-stop crossings of the Atlantic performed by British airline Imperial Airways; yet, the adoption of aerial refuelling by the United States Air Force during the initial post-war years most prominently highlighted the company's technological value.

During 1947, the company relocated to Tarrant Rushton in Dorset. From 1948-9, it was contracted to carry liquid fuel as part of the Berlin Airlift, in what would be known as the 'Liquid Lift'. During the late 1940s, the company's aerial refuelling equipment broke new ground, including a round-the-world flight by specially equipped Boeing B-50 Superfortresses in 1948 and the demonstration of the since-widely used 'probe and drogue' method of air-to-air refuelling for the first time in 1949. The Royal Air Force (RAF) would soon adopt the probe-and-drogue approach, as would various other international customers. Cobham's air-to-air refuelling system was perhaps most crucially used during the Falklands War of 1982, being used to facilitate the long-distance sorties of the RAF's Avro Vulcan bombers for Operation Black Buck, successfully reaching and bombing the Argentinian-held airfield at Port Stanley on the islands.

During 1954, Michael Cobham, Alan's son, took a role in the company; he soon began to steer Cobham to diversify into new markets. One such venture was the reorganising of Cobham Group's Airfield Services division into the newly incorporated FR Aviation, which saw contractor-owned and operated aircraft operate directly alongside military customers. Communications and electronics were other key sectors of interest.

In 1963, the firm centred its manufacturing activity at its new site in Ashington, Wimborne in Dorset. During 1969, Michael took over the leadership of the business from Alan; he remained as Cobham's chairman and chief executive through to the mid 1990s.

During 1985, Cohbam became a public limited company; despite the stock flotation, the Cobham family retained a large stake in the business. As a consequence of various acquisitions and internal growth, Cobham developed various product lines across the aerospace market for both civilian and military, and thus its in-flight refuelling technology became a relatively small element of Cobham's portfolio over time.

In 1994, the firm was formally renamed Cobham plc. By this time, the company had in excess of 10,000 employees and had operations present in North America, Europe, Malaysia and South Africa.

=== 1990s to 2019: Acquisitions and disposals as a listed company ===
In September 1997, Cobham acquired ML Aviation for £37 million, which had taken over Nash & Thompson, a major competitor, the previous year.

In June 2001 Cobham acquired Sierra Flight Systems and merged it into its Chelton Avionics business, naming the combined division Chelton Flight Systems.

In early 2008, Cobham purchased S-TEC Corporation, maker of general aviation autopilots, for $38 million; during February 2008, the company also bought the sensor and antenna systems division of BAE Systems for $240 million. In June 2008, Cobham acquired Sparta Inc., a US defence business, for $416 million (it was renamed Cobham Analytic Solutions). In September 2008 Cobham completed the purchase of the radio frequency components business of M/A-COM for $425 million. In April 2009, Cobham agreed to purchase Argotek Inc., a provider of high-end information assurance services to the United States Intelligence Community, for $36 million. In June 2009, a Cobham – Northrop Grumman 50–50 joint venture won the US Army's US$2.4 billion competition to supply Vehicular Intercom Systems.

In October 2011, Cobham Analytic Solutions was sold for $350 million to the privately owned Parsons Corporation. Then in June 2012, Cobham acquired Danish satellite communications company Thrane & Thrane A/S, making it the core of Cobham's new SATCOM strategic business unit (SBU), to include SeaTel marine, TracStar land and Omnipless airborne SATCOM product lines.

In May 2013, Cobham acquired antenna systems business, Axell Wireless. In July 2013, the company bought out FB Heliservices joint venture partner Bristow Helicopters. In April 2014, Cobham sold Chelton Flight Systems and S-TEC Corporation to Genesys Aerosystems. Then in May 2014, Cobham acquired wireless communications company, Aeroflex Holding Corporation for $1.46 billion.

In August 2016, David Lockwood was named CEO, replacing Bob Murphy.

=== 2019 onwards: Private equity ownership and further restructuring ===
In July 2019, the company's board agreed to recommend a takeover offer of £4 billion from American private equity firm Advent International. However, the bid was criticised by Cobham's largest shareholder, and the firm's chairman subsequently remarked that Cobham was seeking out alternative offers. In response, Advent issued several guarantees, seeking to mollify national security concerns ahead of pending approval of the deal by the British Government. The UK Conservative government approved the takeover in December 2019. The transaction was completed on 17 January 2020. The communications division was sold off in November 2020 to TransDigm Group Inc. for $965 million.

After 18 months, Advent had already sold the bulk of Cobham's operations to other buyers, leaving it with no UK manufacturing operations.

In September 2020, Draken International purchased Cobham Aviation Services based in Bournemouth and Teesside International Airport, and renamed it Draken Europe. Cobham's 15 Dassault Falcon 20 aircraft, were added to Draken's fleet.

On 1 June 2021, Eaton completed their acquisition of Cobham Mission Systems for $2.83 billion, 14 times the company's 2020 earnings.

In August 2021, the British aerospace and defence company, Cobham proposed a £2.6 billion purchase of Ultra Electronics. As the latter was a key national security and defence contractor and Cobham was American-owned at the time, the acquisition was the subject of a national security review. In July 2022, the UK government approved the transaction subject to undertakings by Cobham and Ultra.

In July 2023, French multinational Thales Group entered into a deal to acquire the aerospace communications business of Cobham for $1.1 billion, which completed during the first half of 2024.

In 2025, it was announced that US-based power solutions manufacturer Eaton Corporation had agreed to buy Ultra PCS Limited from Cobham Ultra Group for $1.55 billion. The deal completed in January 2026.

In June 2026, it was announced that Booz Allen Hamilton had agreed to acquire the Ultra I&C Mission Solutions business (Ultra Mission Solutions) for $720 million. Ultra Mission Solutions is a division within Ultra I&C specialising in mission‑critical software, encryption, and edge‑compute products.

On 6 July 2026, it was announced that Lockheed Martin had agreed to acquire Ultra Maritime for $3.45 billion. Upon completion of this transaction, the Cobham Ultra Group will comprise just the Cobham I&C business and the C16 Ventures business.

== Operations ==
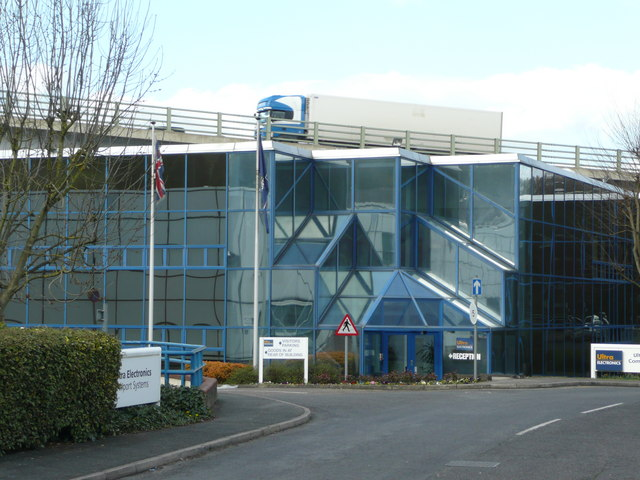
The Ultra Electronics facility at Loudwater, Buckinghamshire

As of 1 July 2026, Cobham is organised into three strategic business units:

- Ultra Maritime: focused on undersea warfare solutions. Lockheed Martin agreed to purchase this business from the Cobham Ultra Group on 6 July 2026.
- Ultra I&C: focused on crypto solutions, mission software and tactical communications for defence applications.
- C16 Ventures: makes early stage and growth equity investments within space, aerospace and defence.

It has facilities in the UK, the United States, Canada and Australia. In January 2020, Ultra launched new branding.

== Products ==
The company produces the Guardian ST820, a battery-operated tracking device used by the American intelligence agency FBI. The device, which is only available to law enforcement entities, can be secured underneath a car by a strong magnet and incorporates a GPS receiver.

In his 2015 book Data and Goliath, American security expert Bruce Schneier wrote that Cobham sells a system enabling buyers to send "blind calls" to mobile phones: calls that don't ring, and are undetectable by the recipient. As described by Schneier, the blind call allows the sender to track the phone's location to within one metre. Schneier noted that Cobham's customers include the governments of Algeria, Brunei, Ghana, Pakistan, Saudi Arabia, Singapore and the United States.

=== Rebreathers ===
Carleton Life Support, a subsidiary of Cobham based in Davenport, Iowa, US makes the MK 16 rebreather used by the United States Navy, and the Siva range of diving rebreathers, originally made by Fullerton Sherwood Engineering.

==== Siva ====
The versions of Siva are:

- Siva S10 oxygen rebreather, with a dive duration rated as 4 hours, which is worn on the chest.
- Siva S24, a dual mode oxygen or semi-closed circuit mixed gas rebreather with maximum operating depth normally limited to 24 metres, but can be set to 55 metres, which is worn on the chest.
- Siva-55 is worn on the back. It has two 200 bar Inconel spheres with a total volume of 5.6 litres. It is superseded by the Carleton Viper The Siva 55, also known as Canadian Clearance Diving Apparatus (CCDA), is rated for an operating depth up to 55 metres. It can be used as a semi-closed circuit rebreather with any one of 3 standard nitrox mixes (32.5, 40 and 60% oxygen) or as a closed circuit oxygen rebreather.
- Siva+ is worn on the back. It is also known as Canadian Underwater Mine-countermeasure Apparatus (CUMA). It is a self-mixing rebreather which works on the principle of a flow of oxygen which is mixed with a diluent to a ratio dependent on the ambient pressure. The Siva+ is rated for 90 metres. The diluent can be air or trimix or heliox.

==== Viper ====
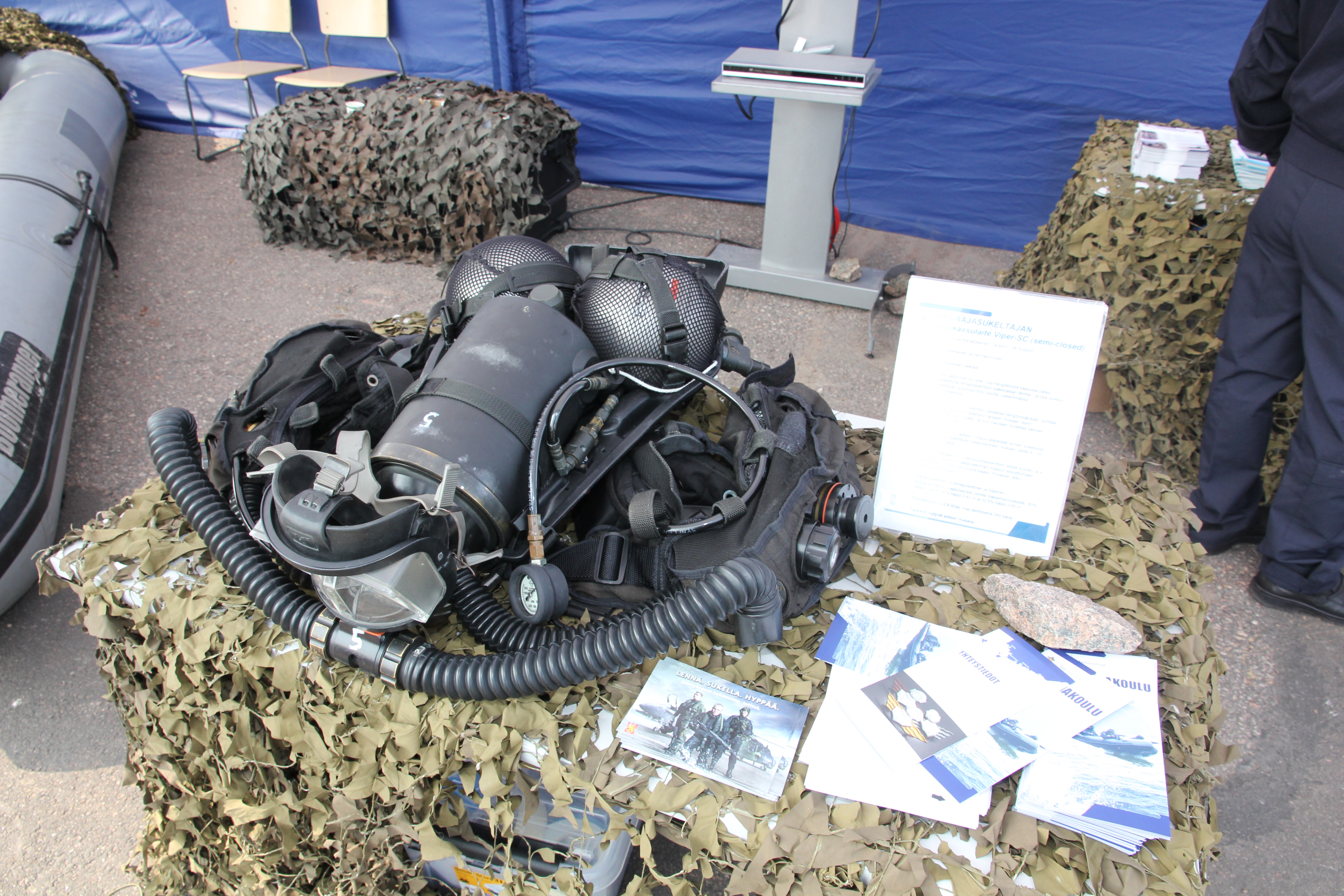
Viper-SC rebreather

Viper is an electronically controlled closed circuit mixed gas rebreather originally manufactured by Carleton Life Support, subsequently acquired by Cobham plc and fitted with the Juergensen Defense Corporation Mark V Electronic Control System. It is designed for use by combat Explosive Ordnance Disposal divers, and for diving to remove naval mines which may be sensitive to sound and magnetic fields. The technology is derived from the Carleton SIVA 55 rebreathers. It is worn in a back inflation buoyancy compensator harness which incorporates two counterlungs, one on each side. All of its components are on the back, exposed. It can use a mouthpiece or a variety of fullface masks. It is designed to be silent and non-magnetic. The front of the wearer is clear, enabling the user to climb in and out of boats and over walls. The Viper has a large cylindrical scrubber canister longitudinally on the back, two spherical gas containers side by side below that, and optionally, a bailout cylinder set transversely underneath. It uses a loop configuration breathing circuit. Three versions of the Viper are made:

- Viper SC Underwater Mine Countermeasures (MCM) Diving Apparatus
- Viper Plus
- Viper E Mixed Gas Underwater Breathing Apparatus

== Queen's Awards for Enterprise ==
- 2007: Cobham Defense Communications, based in Blackburn, Lancashire, received a Queen's Award for Enterprise in the International Trade category. The business was awarded the award for its ability to supply leading edge intercom systems to customers around the world.
- 2009: Cobham Surveillance, based in Segensworth, Hampshire, England, received a Queen's Award for Enterprise in the International Trade category. The business – formerly known as Domo Ltd – tripled its export sales in three years.
- 2010: Cobham Surveillance, based in Segensworth, Hampshire, received a Queen's Award for Enterprise in the Innovation category. The award was for the development of its Solo4 wireless digital audio and video link technology that improves safety for bomb disposal teams and law enforcement personnel by increasing the range at which they can effectively operate their robotic bomb disposal equipment.
- 2010: Cobham Antenna Systems, based in Marlow, Buckinghamshire, received a Queen's Award for Enterprise in the International Trade category. The business – formerly known as Chelton Ltd – continuously increased export revenues over six years and sells over 80% of its production overseas.

== Sports club ==
The company created Cobham Sports and Social Club, a members' club in Merley near the main manufacturing site in Wimborne, Dorset in 1971. Whilst this club is no longer part of Cobham, it still uses the Cobham branding and is used as the ground for Merley Cobham Sports F.C.

== See also ==
- Aerospace industry in the United Kingdom
- Sargent Fletcher – American manufacturer of aircraft equipment
- Cobham Technical Services
- ERA Technology Ltd – UK business

== Bibliography ==
- Gardner, Brian (1984). "Flight Refuelling... The Wartime Story". Air Enthusiast. No. 25. pp. 34–43, 80. ISSN 0143-5450.
