= ERA Technology =

UK business

- Industry: technology
- Founded: 1920
- Headquarters: United Kingdom

ERA Technology is a UK-based technology organisation that provides specialist engineering consultancy to owners and operators of large-value capital assets and systems, helping clients reduce risk, improve operational performance and comply with functional safety and regulatory requirements.

The organisation became part of the Edif Group in February 2011.

== History ==
The business was founded in 1920. ERA, now part of the Edif Group, was originally incorporated under the name "The British Electrical and Allied Industries Research Association", but was generally known as "The Electrical Research Association", or "ERA". Initially, ERA's funding came jointly from government, through the Department of Scientific and Industrial Research, from industry, and from the subscriptions of member companies.

Prior to ERA, there had been no real facility for co-operative electrical research in the UK, although some research was carried out by a few manufacturers, suppliers and larger users of electricity. ERA filled the recognised gap in the organisation of the industry, by supplying research and technology innovation.

During the 1939–1945 war, direct assistance to the war effort was given by ERA, having been recognised by the Ministry of Labour in 1941 as an ‘essential undertaking’. Activities during the war included working on the development of radar and mine detection equipment.

Major new laboratories and offices were opened in Leatherhead, Surrey in 1957 which have remained the headquarters of the organisation ever since. Development on the 15-acre campus site has continued to the present day with the addition of several large purpose-built facilities.

=== Privatisation ===
Until the late 1960s, ERA had derived much of its income from member company subscriptions and UK government grants. After 1969 ERA began reorganising its mode of operation to reflect the rapidly changing technology base within the industries it served. This enabled the company to derive income from single client and multi-client projects. ERA became the first 'privatised' research association.

In September 1979 ERA formally changed its name from The Electrical Research Association Ltd to ERA Technology Ltd.

During the 1970s, 1980s and 1990s ERA continued to grow and develop into new research areas, including RF technology and electronic systems. It also expanded into providing a wide range of engineering consultancy services for mechanical as well as electronic and electrical systems.

In January 2001, the entire organisation was transferred to a new trading company, limited by shares. The original company, still limited by guarantee, was renamed The ERA Foundation. The trading operation, retaining the name ERA Technology, was run as a wholly commercial enterprise, responsible to its shareholders.

In September 2003, Cobham plc acquired ERA Technology for a reported £20m.

In March 2009, ERA Technology, Culham Lightning and Vector Fields assumed the collective trading name Cobham Technical Services as part of a Group wide rebranding programme by FTSE 100 parent company Cobham plc.

In March 2011, Cobham plc completed the divestment of the engineering consultancy group of Cobham Technical Services to Edif Group (a company backed by Phoenix Equity Partners, a UK mid-market private equity investor)., which took the legal entity name "ERA Technology Ltd".

In November 2011 Edif completed its second acquisition with the buyout of NDE Global Technical Services GmbH (NDE).

== In the news ==
- ERA's Ground Penetrating Radar used to discover buried victims of serial killer Fred West -
- ERA's Ground Penetrating Radar used to discover buried victims of serial killer Peter Tobin -
