= S-TEC Corporation =

- Type: Private
- Industry: Aerospace
- Founded: 1978
- Headquarters: Mineral Wells, Texas, USA
- Products: Avionics
- Parent: Moog Inc.

S-TEC Corporation is a United States corporation that was founded in 1978 and is headquartered in Mineral Wells, Texas. It manufactures flight control systems for the General Aviation aftermarket and for a number of original equipment manufacturers. S-TEC appeared to have been the leader in the general aviation autopilot market for small- and mid-sized planes, though Garmin's GFC 500 autopilot appears to have become more popular after its release in 2017.

== Customers ==
Genesys Aerosystems has a number of forward-fit autopilot customers including Pilatus, Indonesian Aerospace, Epic Aircraft, and Aviat Aircraft. Their latest autopilot, the S-TEC 3100, has earned Supplemental Type Certificate (STC) on over 100 aircraft models.

== History ==
Meggitt acquired S-TEC and S-TEC Unmanned Technologies (SUTI) for $24 million in 2000. (DRS Technologies purchased the UAV business from Meggitt in 2002 but later closed the Mineral Wells facility.)

S-TEC was purchased for $38 million by Cobham plc in 2008.

In April 2014, Cobham sold Chelton Flight Systems and S-TEC Corporation to Genesys Aerosystems.

December 21, 2020, Moog Inc. announced its acquisition of Genesys Aerosystems Group, Inc, including S-TEC Corporation.

== Products ==
=== Avionics ===
- Autopilot for small- and mid-sized planes
- S-TEC 5000
- S-TEC 3100
- S-TEC 2100
- S-TEC IntelliFlight 1950
- S-TEC System 65
- S-TEC System 60-2
- S-TEC System 55X
- S-TEC System 40/50
- S-TEC System 30ALT/60PSS
- S-TEC System 20/30
- SA-200 Altitude Pre-Selector
- ST-360 Altitude Pre-Selector w/Alerter
- GPSS
- Yaw Damper

=== Aircraft ===
- S-TEC Sentry
