= Fletcher FBT-2 =

Military trainer aircraft

FBT-2

General information
- Type: Trainer
- Manufacturer: Fletcher Aviation
- Designer: Wendell Fletcher
- Primary user: United States Army Air Forces
- Number built: 1 (and 10 airframes converted to glide bombs)

History
- First flight: 1941
- Variant: Fletcher BG-2

The Fletcher FBT-2 was a military trainer aircraft built in the United States in the early 1940s. Although it was never entered production as a trainer, it was ordered in small numbers as a target drone but when that was cancelled played a small part in the development of guided bombs.

== Design and development ==
The FBT-2 was a low-wing cantilever monoplane with fixed tailwheel undercarriage which seated the pilot and instructor in tandem in an enclosed cockpit. Construction throughout was of plywood, and the wings were interchangeable, as were the tail panels.

== Operational history ==
A single prototype was evaluated for military use, but generated no interest. However, the USAAF ordered the type as a radio-controlled target drone under the designation XPQ-11. The prototype FBT-2 was modified for use as a drone controller as the YCQ-1A. Two batches of 50 drones were ordered; however before any were delivered, the type was cancelled in favor of the PQ-8 Cadet, only the single prototype XPQ-11 being completed. The Army then ordered the ten PQ-11s under construction to be completed as XBG-1 glide bombs, the engine being removed and replaced with a 2,000-pound (910 kg) bomb. Testing was conducted, but the type failed to enter operational service.

== Variants ==
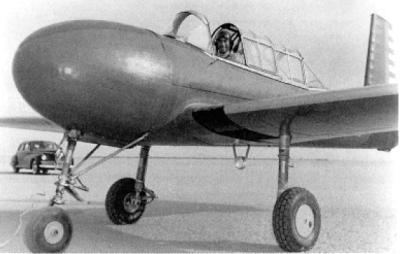
BG-1 at Muroc Army Air Field, 1942.

- FBT-2 - basic trainer with Wright R-760 engine and tailwheel undercarriage (1 built)
  - CQ-1 - drone controller with tricycle undercarriage (1 converted from FBT-2)
- PQ-11 - aerial target with tricycle undercarriage and Pratt & Whitney R-985 engine (contract cancelled before aircraft completed)
  - BG-1 - glide bomb with 2,000-pound (910 kg) warhead (10 built from unfinished PQ-11s)

== Operators ==
United States

- United States Army Air Forces

== Specifications (FBT-2) ==
Data from Taylor

General characteristics

- Crew: 1 (pilot; optional)
- Length: 23 ft 3 in (7.09 m)
- Wingspan: 30 ft (9.1 m)
- Height: 10 ft 5 in (3.18 m)
- Powerplant: 1 × Wright R-760-E2 Whirlwind radial engine, 285 hp (213 kW)

Performance

- Maximum speed: 175 mph (282 km/h, 152 kn)
- Range: 540 mi (870 km, 470 nmi)
- Service ceiling: 19,000 ft (5,800 m)

Armament

- None in FBT-2 or PQ-11
- XBG-1: 2,000-pound (910 kg) warhead.

== See also ==
Aircraft of comparable role, configuration, and era

- Pratt-Read LBE
- Piper LBP
- Taylorcraft LBT

Related lists

- List of military aircraft of the United States
- List of unmanned aerial vehicles
