= Leonardo DRS =

US-based defense contractor

Leonardo DRS, Inc.
- Formerly: DRS Technologies, Inc.
- Type: Public
- Traded as: Nasdaq: DRS; Russell 1000 component
- Industry: Defense
- Founded: 1968; 58 years ago
- Founders: Leonard Newman and David Gross
- Headquarters: Arlington, Virginia, U.S.
- Key people: William J. Lynn (former Chairman & CEO), John Baylouny (president & CEO)
- Revenue: ▲US$3.6 billion (2025)
- Number of employees: 7,300
- Parent: Leonardo S.p.A. (80.5%)
- Website: leonardodrs.com

Leonardo DRS, Inc. is a United States–based defense contractor part of the Italian conglomerate Leonardo. Originally founded as DRS Technologies, Inc. and traded on the NYSE, it was acquired by Leonardo's predecessor Finmeccanica in 2008. Leonardo DRS provides advanced defense technologies and systems primarily to the U.S. military.

== History ==
Diagnostic/Retrieval Systems, Inc (DRS) was founded in 1968 by Leonard Newman and David Gross, two engineers working for Loral Corporation. The two were working on signal processing techniques for anti-submarine warfare. When Loral chose to pursue other technology, Newman and Gross founded DRS to continue their research, which ultimately led to development of the AN/SQR-17 passive submarine detection system, a product still used today.

DRS went public in 1981 and acquired its first company in 1984. By 1994, DRS set a goal to become a mid-tier defense contractor, defined by $500 million in sales – notwithstanding that DRS at the time had only $58M in sales. Also in 1994, Mark Newman, son of founder Leonard Newman, became company president and CEO after having joined the company in 1973. He was named chairman when his father retired in 1995. Six years later, at the turn of the century, DRS reached the $391 million sales level, and in 2004 surpassed the $1 billion sales mark.

DRS was acquired by the Italian conglomerate Finmeccanica S.p.A. (now Leonardo S.p.A.) in 2008. In 2012, former United States Deputy Secretary of Defense, William J. Lynn III was appointed CEO of Finmeccanica North America DRS, replacing Mark Newman, who held the position since 1994.

In June 2022 the US subsidiary of the Italian defense conglomerate Leonardo, Leonardo DRS, agreed to an all share acquisition of the US subsidiary of RADA Electronic Industries. The new Leonardo subsidiary will be listed on the Nasdaq and Tel Aviv stock exchanges under the name DRS with RADA shareholders keeping 19.5% of the combined business and Leonardo holding the remainder.

== Products ==
=== Advanced Trainer ===
- Leonardo DRS T-100 Integrated Training System
- M1000 Trailer, part of the Heavy Equipment Transport System

=== Drone ===
- DRS RQ-15 Neptune
- DRS Sentry HP

== See also ==
- Top 100 US Federal Contractors
