= S-TEC Sentry =

Sentry

General information
- Type: Reconnaissance UAV
- National origin: United States
- Manufacturer: S-TEC

History
- First flight: 1986

The S-TEC Sentry is a reconnaissance unmanned aerial vehicle (UAV) (or drone), developed in the United States in the 1980s. Built by S-TEC systems of Texas (now part of DRS Unmanned Technologies), it is a battlefield mini-UAV in roughly the same class as the BAI Dragon drone. In fact, the Sentry looks something like an Exdrone with a twin-boom raised tail. It is built of carbon composition and Kevlar, and powered by a 19.5 kW (26 hp) piston engine in a tractor configuration.

S-TEC's main business is building autopilots for civil aviation, and small UAVs were a logical extension of that business. S-TEC introduced the Sentry in 1986, and has sold over 130 since that time. Launch is via a wheeled dolly or pneumatic catapult, and recovery via parasail or on skid landing gear.

In an interesting experiment, the company has experimented with carriage of the BLU-108 Sensor Fuzed Weapon (SFW) anti-armor submunition on the Sentry. After release in a target area, the cylindrical SFW pops out a small parachute to orient itself and then fires out four "skeet" projectiles in four directions. The skeets have an infrared sensor to detect when they are flying over the top of an armored vehicle, and then fire a penetrator slug straight down to punch through the top armor.

S-TEC has teamed with TRW Corporation in the US and IAI of Israel to sell UAVs on the international market.

== Specifications ==
General characteristics

- Crew: None
- Capacity: 60 lb (27 kg) payload
- Length: 8 ft 0 in (2.24 m)
- Wingspan: 11 ft 0 in (3.35 m)
- Empty weight: 130 lb (59 kg)
- Gross weight: 240 lb (109 kg)
- Powerplant: 1 × Herbrandson Dyad 290 , 26 hp (20 kW)

Performance

- Maximum speed: 110 mph (175 km/h, 96 kn)
- Endurance: 8 hours
- Service ceiling: 16,000 ft (4,900 m)
