= Pratt-Read =

American manufacturing company

- Company type: Subsidiary of Ideal Industries
- Industry: Manufacturing
- Founded: 1798 in Ivoryton, Connecticut
- Headquarters: Sycamore, Illinois
- Products: Hand tools
- Number of employees: 140
- Website: www.prattread.com

Pratt-Read is an American manufacturing company based in Sycamore, Illinois, that produces screwdrivers. It is a subsidiary of Ideal Industries. Founded in 1798, it is one of the oldest companies in the United States.

== History ==
Pratt-Read was founded in Ivoryton, Connecticut, in 1798 as Pratt, Read & Company, originally producing beads, buttons, and billiard balls from elephant tusks imported from Africa. The company began to specialize in manufacturing ivory piano keys in 1839 and eventually piano action mechanisms.

The company made its first screwdrivers in 1834 but stopped in 1840, instead selling the handles and blades to smaller companies made at the Pratt, Read and Company Factory Complex. During World War II, the company continued producing screwdriver blades and suspended production of piano parts to manufacture Waco CG-4 gliders for the military. The company built 956 of the fabric-covered wood and steel airframes.

Piano part production continued after the war, but the company gradually shifted its focus to manufacturing screwdrivers, and in the late 1980s, ended its piano parts business, closing a facility in Central, South Carolina, and began to focus on screwdrivers exclusively. Pratt-Read manufactures its own handles, blades, and—after a 2005 acquisition of Wisconsin-based American Industrial Manufacturers—bits, all in the U.S., which it sells directly to users under its own name, as well as to manufacturers such as Stanley, Snap-on, Danaher, and Klein.

In 2009, Pratt-Read filed for Chapter 11 bankruptcy protection.

On March 22, 2010, Ideal Industries announced the acquisition of Pratt-Read from bankruptcy. Ideal acquired the Pratt-Read name and equipment and continued production out of existing Ideal facilities, as the Pratt-Read facility in Shelton, Connecticut had already ended operations.

== Gallery ==
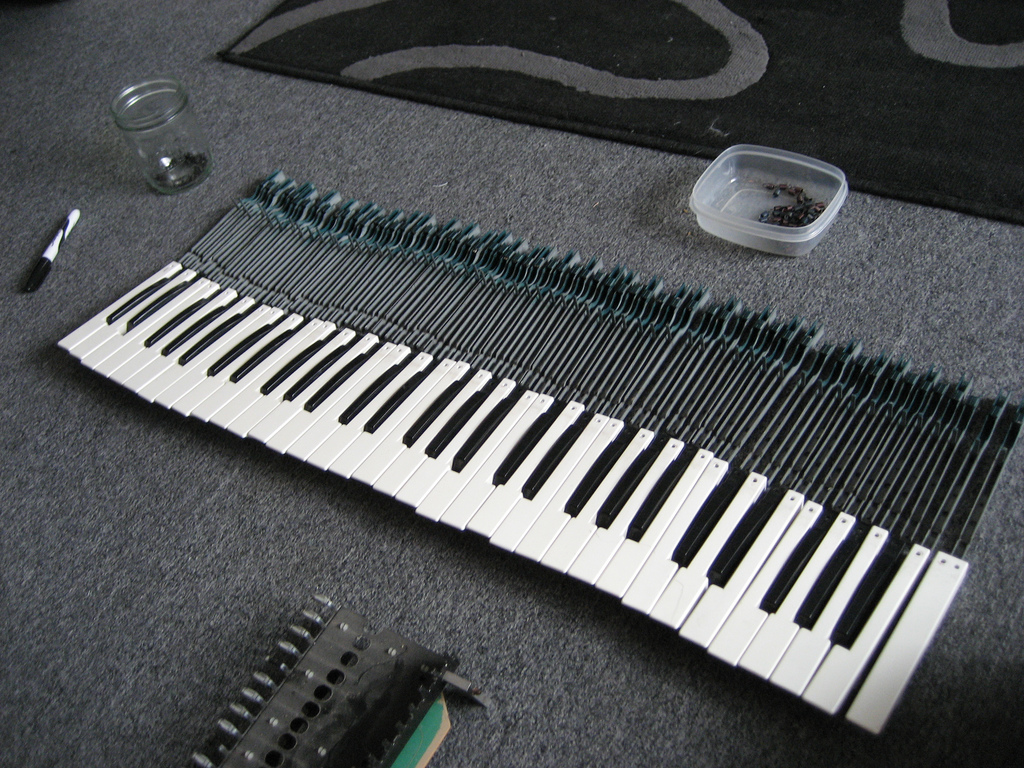
A Pratt-Read keyboard assembly removed from an organ.

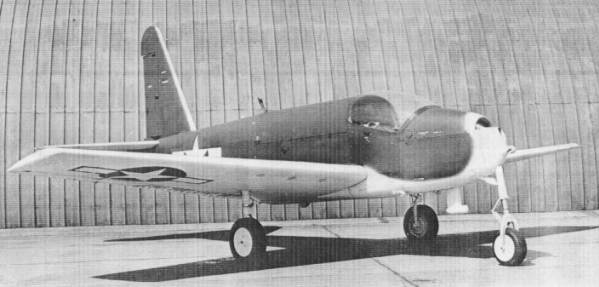
A Pratt-Read LBE-1 "Glomb" (Glider-Bomb) prototype.

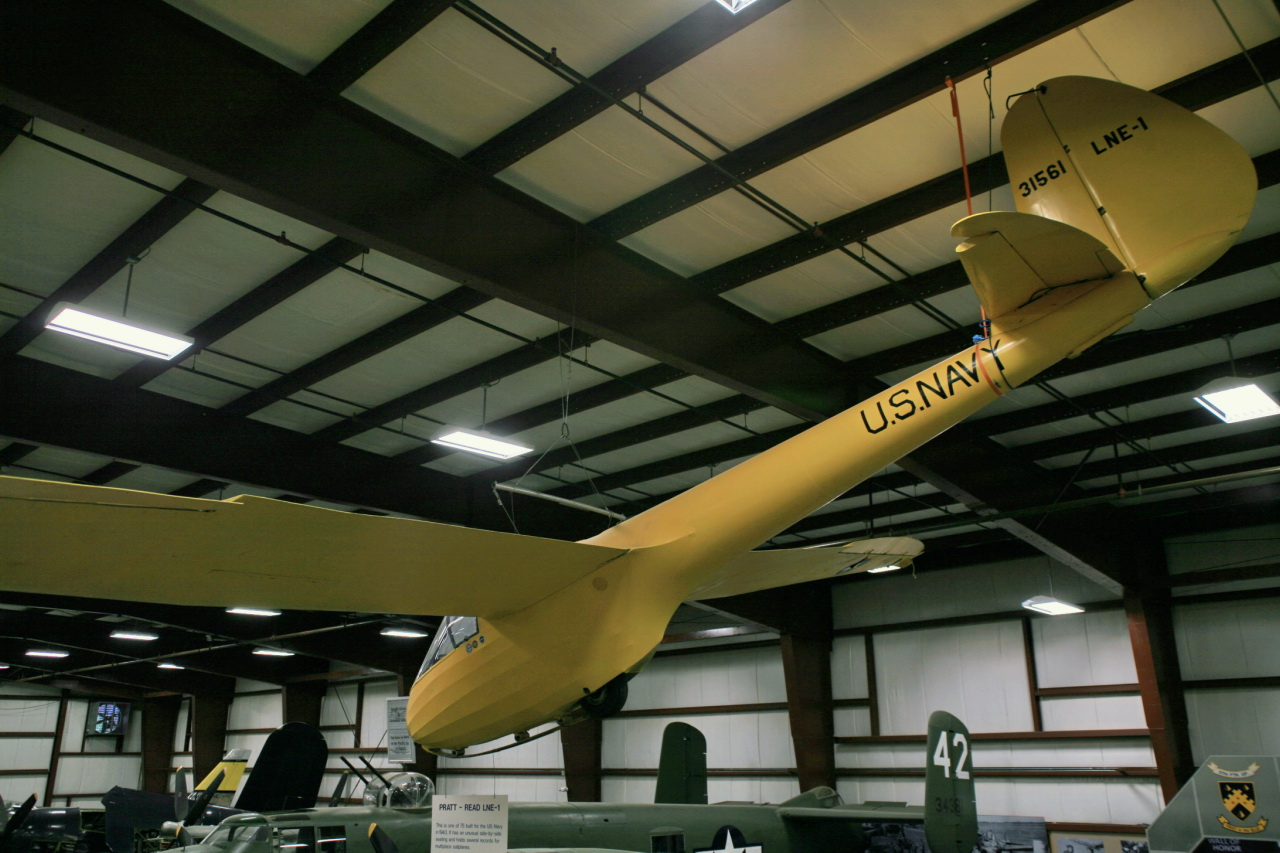
A Pratt-Read LNE-1 glider, made for the U.S. Navy during World War II, on display at the New England Air Museum.

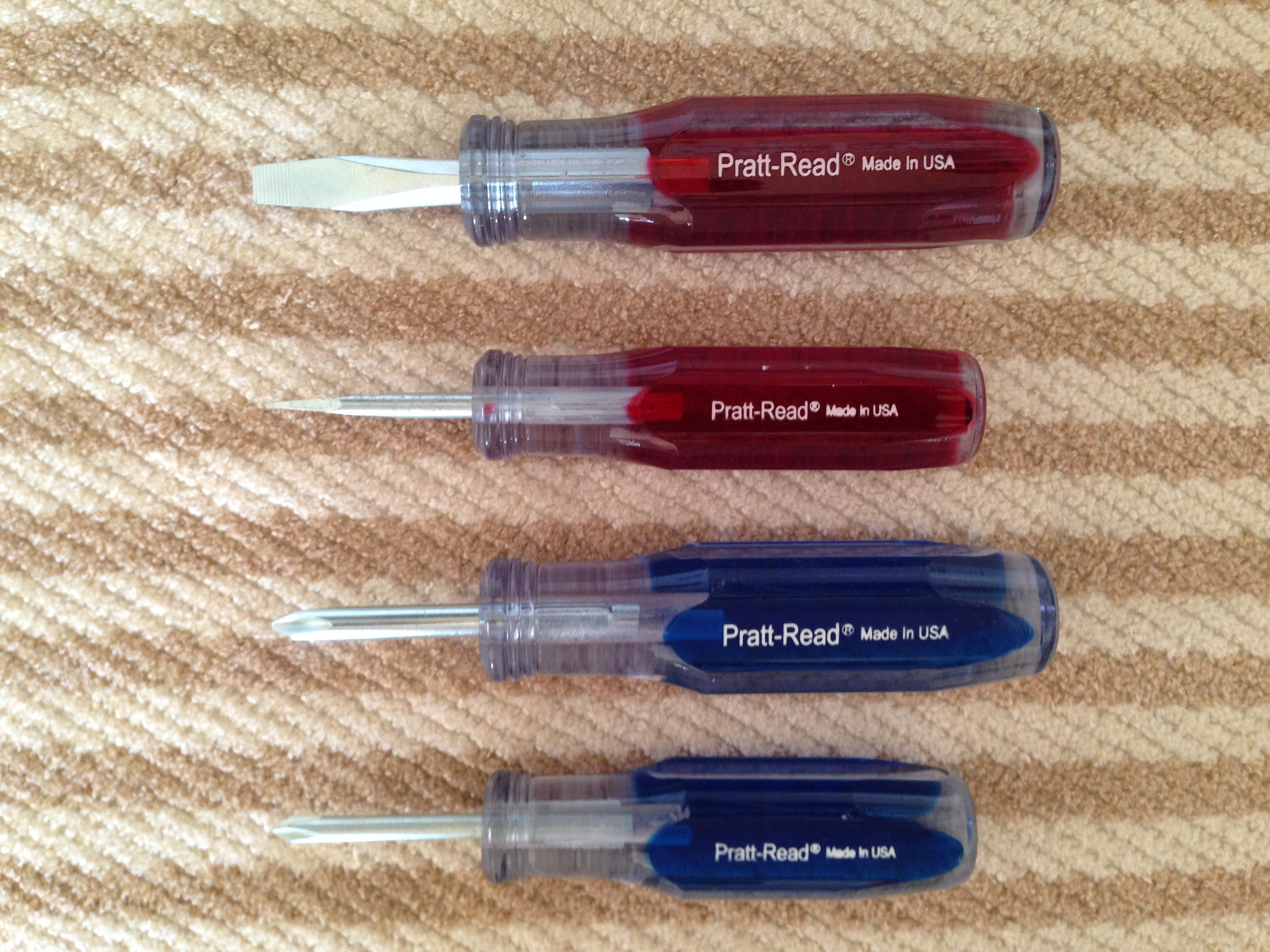
A set of Pratt-Read "super stubby" screwdrivers. These have shortened blades but regular-sized handles.

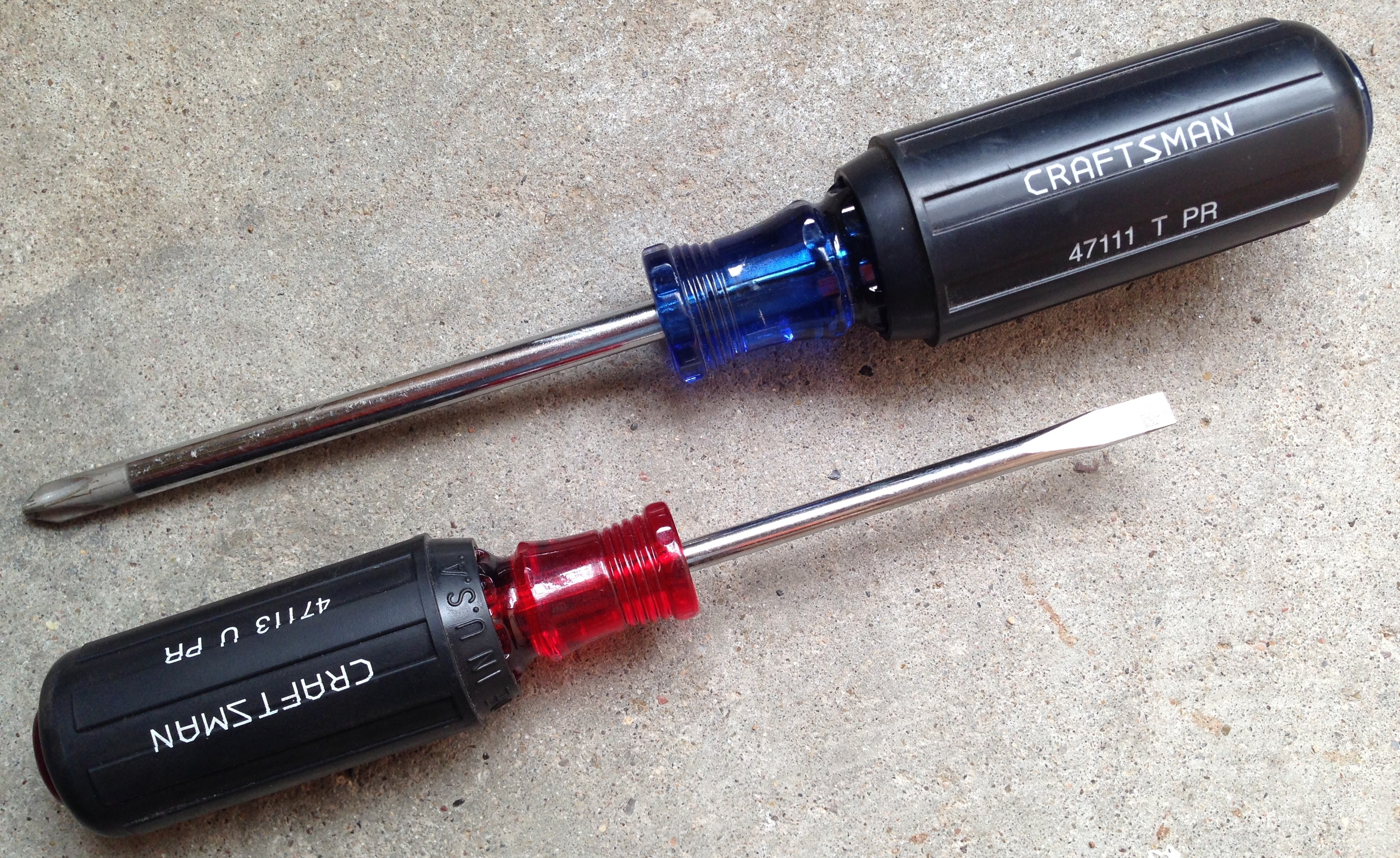
Two Pratt-Read cushion grip screwdrivers, manufactured for the Craftsman brand.

== See also ==
- Pratt, Read and Company Factory Complex
- Pratt-Read LBE
- Pratt-Read TG-32
- Sohmer & Co.
