= Taylorcraft F22 =

American light aircraft of the 1980s

F22
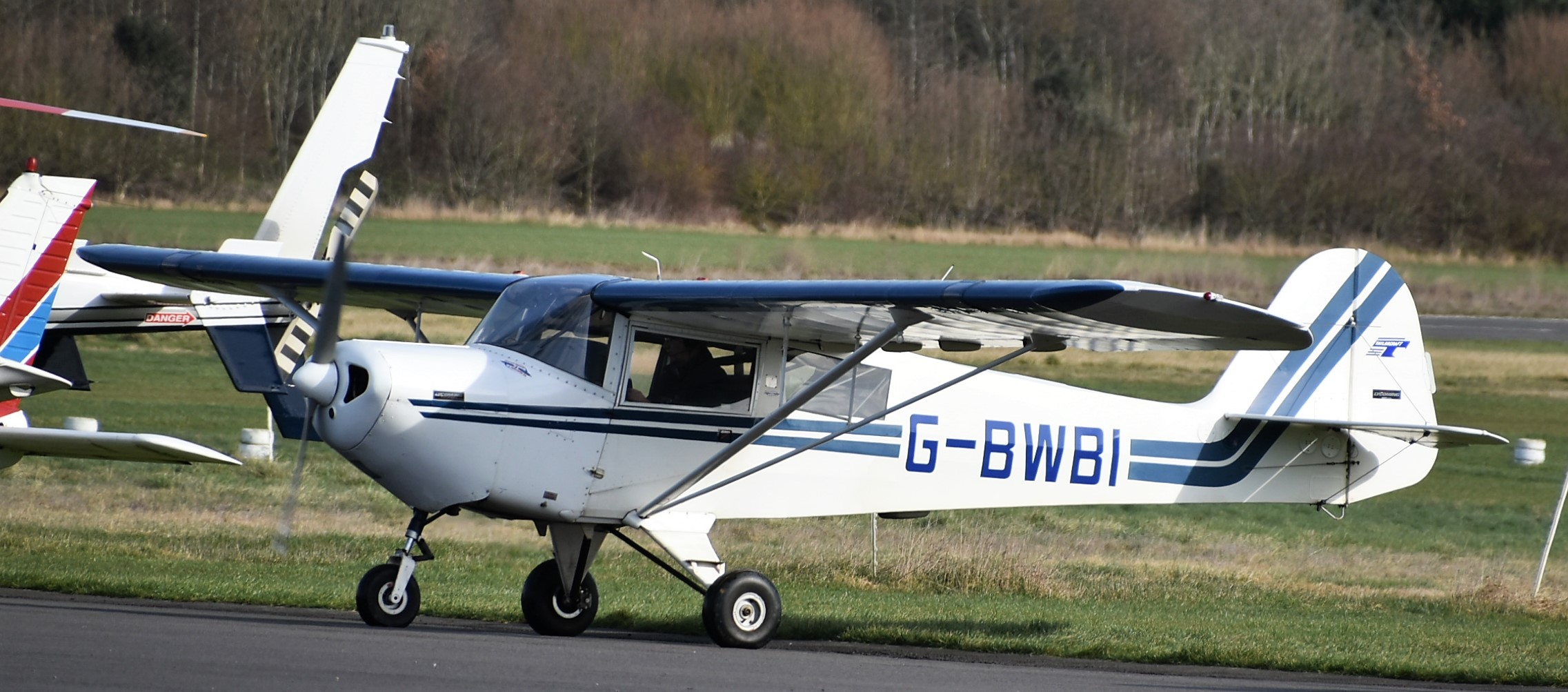
- A UK-registered F22A in 2019

General information
- Type: Light utility aircraft
- National origin: USA
- Manufacturer: Taylorcraft
- Number built: 17

History
- Introduction date: 1989
- First flight: August 1, 1988
- Developed from: Taylorcraft F-21

The Taylorcraft F22 is a two-seat American light aircraft produced in small numbers by Taylorcraft in the late 1980s and early 1990s. It is a further development of the Taylorcraft F-19 via the F-21 design. Manufacturing and marketing of the F22 was halted by the financial difficulties of Taylorcraft, although plans to restart production existed in 2007.

== Design and development ==
The F22 is a high-wing, strut-braced monoplane of conventional design. Two of the four variants produced had fixed, tailwheel undercarriage, but the F22A and F22C had fixed, tricycle undercarriage instead. The pilot and a single passenger sit side-by-side in an enclosed cabin. Power is supplied by a piston engine mounted tractor-fashion in the nose, driving a propeller. The airframe is of welded steel tube, covered in fabric.

The prototype, registered N180GT, first flew on August 1, 1989, and production started at Taylorcraft's Lock Haven factory by the end of the year. In 1992, after only 17 F22s were built, Taylorcraft was bankrupt and ceased business.

== Variants ==
F22 Classic
Developed from the F-21B. Lycoming O-235 engine. Prototype N180GT had tricycle undercarriage, but production examples had tailwheels. (4 built, including prototype)
F22A Tracker
Also marketed as the Tri-Classic. Lycoming O-235-powered version with tricycle undercarriage. (11 built)
F22B Ranger
Also marketed as the STOL-180. Tailwheel version with Lycoming O-360 engine. (1 built)
F22C Trooper
Also marketed as the TriSTOL. Tricycle undercarriage version with Lycoming O-360 engine. (1 built)

== Specifications (F22A) ==
Data from Jackson 2007, p.906

General characteristics

- Crew: 1 pilot
- Capacity: 1 passenger
- Length: 22 ft 3 in (6.78 m)
- Wingspan: 36 ft 0 in (10.97 m)
- Height: 7 ft 7 in (2.31 m)
- Wing area: 183.7 sq ft (17.07 m^{2})
- Empty weight: 1,140 lb (517 kg)
- Max takeoff weight: 1,750 lb (794 kg)
- Powerplant: 1 × Lycoming O-235-L2C four-cylinder, horizontally-opposed, air-cooled piston engine, 118 hp (88 kW)

Performance

- Maximum speed: 96 kn (110 mph, 178 km/h)
- Cruise speed: 87 kn (100 mph, 161 km/h) at 75% power
- Range: 530 nmi (610 mi, 980 km) at 75% power, 30 minute reserve
- Service ceiling: 18,000 ft (5,500 m)
- Rate of climb: 750 ft/min (3.8 m/s) maximum, at sea level
- Wing loading: 9.53 lb/sq ft (46.5 kg/m^{2})
