= KLPC =

KLPC may refer to:

- KLPC-LP, a low-power radio station (94.3 FM) licensed to Lone Pine, California, United States
- the ICAO code for Lompoc Airport, in Lompoc, California, United States
