= F21 =

F21 or F-21 may refer to:

== Aviation ==
- F 21 Luleå, a Swedish Air Force wing
- IAI F-21 Kfir, a 1973 Israeli-built all-weather, multi-role combat aircraft
- Lockheed Martin F-21, a variant of the F-16 designed for the Indian Air Force
- KAI KF-21 Boramae, a South Korean/Indonesian stealth fighter currently under development
- Farman F.21 Moustique II, a French interwar airplane
- Taylorcraft F-21, an American light aircraft

== Nautical ==
- F21 (torpedo), a torpedo developed for the French Navy
- Italian submarine F21, an Italian Regia Marina (Royal Navy) submarine in commission from 1918 to 1930
- HMS Punjabi (F21), a 1937 British Royal Navy Tribal-class destroyer
- ARV Mariscal Sucre (F-21), a Venezuelan navy frigate
- INS Gomati (F21), an Indian Navy Godavari-class frigate
- ROCS Tai Kang (F-21), a Taiwanese navy destroyer

== Land transport ==
- F-21 (Michigan county highway)
- BMW Series 1, that had a model code called "F21"

== Other uses ==
- Schizotypal personality disorder, whose ICD-10 code is "F21"
- Fluorine-21 (F-21 or ^{21}F), an isotope of fluorine
- Forever 21

== See also ==
- Shenyang J-21, 5th generation fighter, also referred to as the "F-21"
- 21 (disambiguation)
