= Taylorcraft 15 =

American-built general purpose monoplane of the 1950s

Model 15

General information
- Type: General purpose monoplane
- National origin: United States
- Manufacturer: Taylorcraft
- Number built: 25 Model 15/15A + 1 Model 16

History
- Introduction date: 1950
- First flight: November 1, 1944

The Taylorcraft 15, which entered production as the 15A Tourist was an American-built general-purpose high-wing monoplane of the 1950s. It was a four-seat development of the two-seat Taylorcraft BC, fitted with a more powerful engine.

== Design and development ==
The Model 15 is a high-wing, strut-braced monoplane of conventional configuration with an enclosed cabin and fixed tailwheel undercarriage. Seating is 2+2 style, and the cabin is equipped with dual controls. Power was originally supplied by a 125-hp (93.3-kW) Lycoming O-290 engine, mounted tractor-fashion and driving a two-bladed wooden propeller. The fuselage and tail are built from welded steel tube, covered in fabric. The wing is of mixed wood and metal construction, also covered in fabric. Long V-struts brace the wings to the lower longeron of the fuselage. The wing is equipped with manually operated flaps and fixed, leading-edge slots.

The Model 15 was designed in 1943–44, perhaps with the input of Taylorcraft founder C. G. Taylor. The prototype, registered NX36320, first flew on November 1, 1944. During testing, the Lycoming engine proved insufficiently powerful, and it was replaced with a Franklin 6A4-150-B3 of 150 hp (120 kW).

Plans to put the aircraft into production were stopped by a 1946 fire at the Taylorcraft factory at Alliance, Ohio that destroyed jigs, dies, and fixtures that were prepared for its manufacture. Shortly thereafter, the company was forced into bankruptcy. The prototype Model 15 was purchased along with the rest of the company assets by Ben Mauro, who by 1949 was able to relocate it to a new factory at Conway, Pennsylvania. He re-commenced production of the Model B family, and put the Model 15 into production. However, sales of general aviation aircraft in the 1950s were slow, and fewer than 30 examples were built before Taylorcraft had to cease operations again.

== Variants ==
Model 15
Prototype, NX36320, 1 built 1944
Model 15A
Production version, 24 built
Model 16
Experimental development, NX40070, 1 built, 1946

== Specifications ==
Data from Bridgman 1947, p.294-95

General characteristics

- Crew: 1
- Capacity: 3 passengers
- Length: 24 ft 1 in (7.34 m)
- Wingspan: 36 ft 5 in (11.10 m)
- Height: 7 ft 3 in (2.21 m)
- Wing area: 207 sq ft (19.2 m^{2})
- Empty weight: 1,650 lb (748 kg)
- Gross weight: 2,450 lb (1,111 kg)
- Powerplant: 1 × Franklin 6A4 6-cylinder, air-cooled, horizontally-opposed piston, 150 hp (110 kW)

Performance

- Maximum speed: 120 mph (190 km/h, 100 kn)
- Cruise speed: 110 mph (180 km/h, 96 kn)
- Range: 575 mi (925 km, 500 nmi)
- Service ceiling: 12,000 ft (3,700 m)
- Rate of climb: 500 ft/min (2.5 m/s) (initial)
- Wing loading: 11.8 lb/sq ft (58 kg/m^{2})
