= Marques Brownlee =

American YouTuber (born 1993)

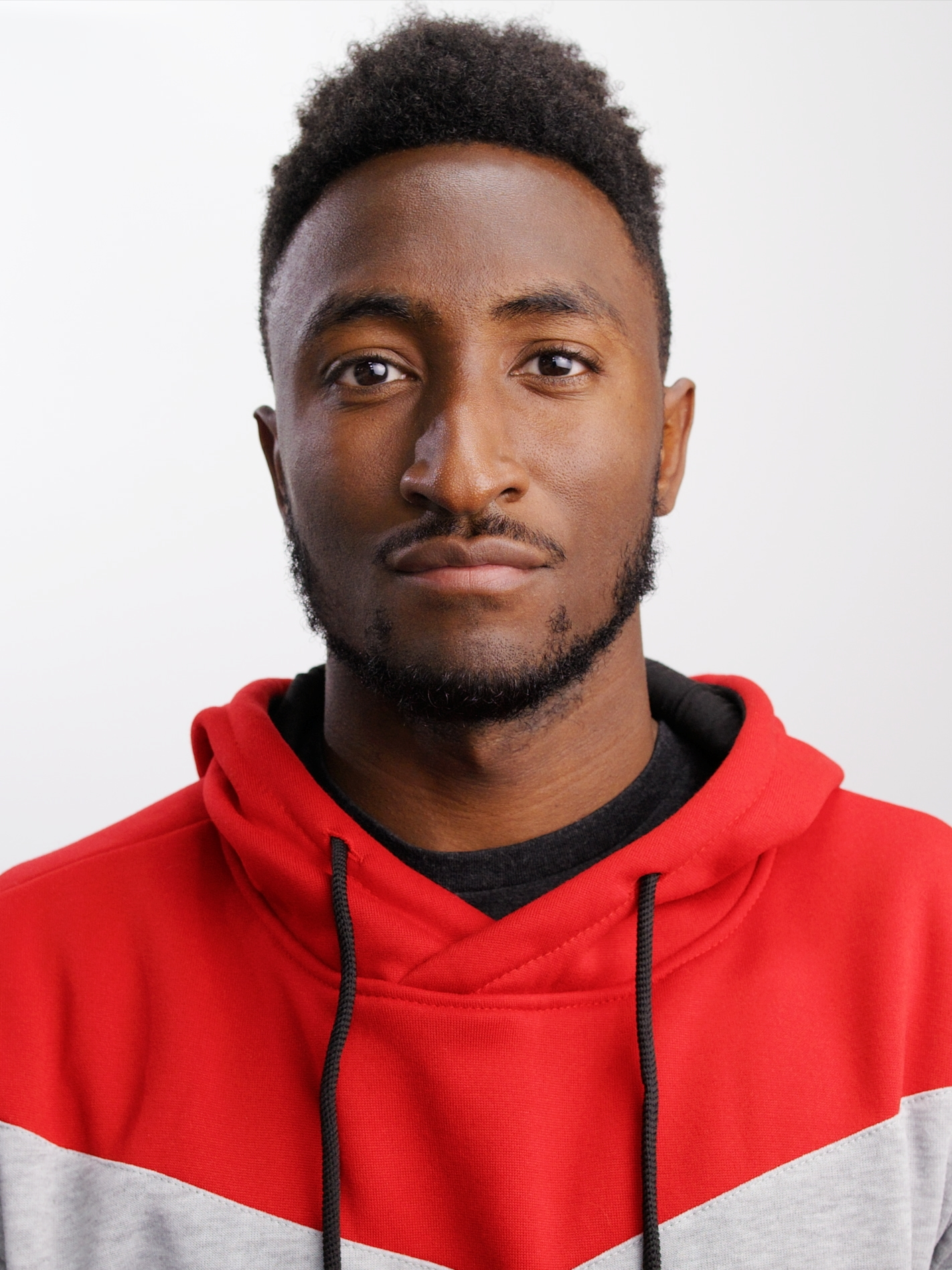
- Brownlee in 2021
- Born: Marques Keith Brownlee; December 3, 1993 (age 32); Maplewood Township, New Jersey, U.S.
- Other name: MKBHD
- Education: Stevens Institute of Technology (BS)
- Occupations: YouTuber; tech blogger; podcaster; influencer

YouTube information
- Channel: Marques Brownlee
- Years active: 2008–present
- Genres: Technology; consumer electronics; reviewer
- Subscribers: 20.9 million (main channel); 24.91 million (combined) (Note: Subscribers, broken down by channel: 20.9 million (Marques Brownlee); 631 thousand (MKBHD Shorts); 1.1 million (The Studio); 512 thousand (WVFRM Podcast); 533 thousand (Waveform Clips); 1.23 million (Auto Focus))
- Views: 5.374 billion (main channel); 5.95 billion (combined) (Note: Views, broken down by channel: 5.3748 billion (Marques Brownlee); 65.708 million (MKBHD Shorts); 163.122 million (The Studio); 111.318 million (WVFRM Podcast); 112.627 million (Waveform Clips); 162.759 million (Auto Focus))
- Last updated: May 3, 2026
- Website: mkbhd.com

Marques Brownlee
Medal record

Representing United States

Ultimate frisbee

World Games
Gold medal – first place	2025 Chengdu	Mixed team

Brownlee's logo

Marques Keith Brownlee (/mɑːrˈkɛz ˈbraʊnli/ mar-KEZ BROWN-lee; born December 3, 1993), known professionally as MKBHD, is an American influencer, tech reviewer, postcaster and professional ultimate frisbee player, best known for his YouTube videos reviewing technology devices.

In 2013, Vic Gundotra, a former senior vice president of Google, called Brownlee "the best technology reviewer on the planet right now". At the 10th Shorty Awards in 2018, he was named "Creator of the Decade". The username of his YouTube channel is a concatenation of MKB (Brownlee's initials) and HD (for high definition). As of 2025, he has more than 20 million subscribers across all channels and billions of total video views.

With New York PoNY, Brownlee is the 2022 WFDF World Champion in the Open Category for ultimate Frisbee. In 2024, Time magazine named him to its "TIME100 Most Influential People in AI" list.

== Online career ==
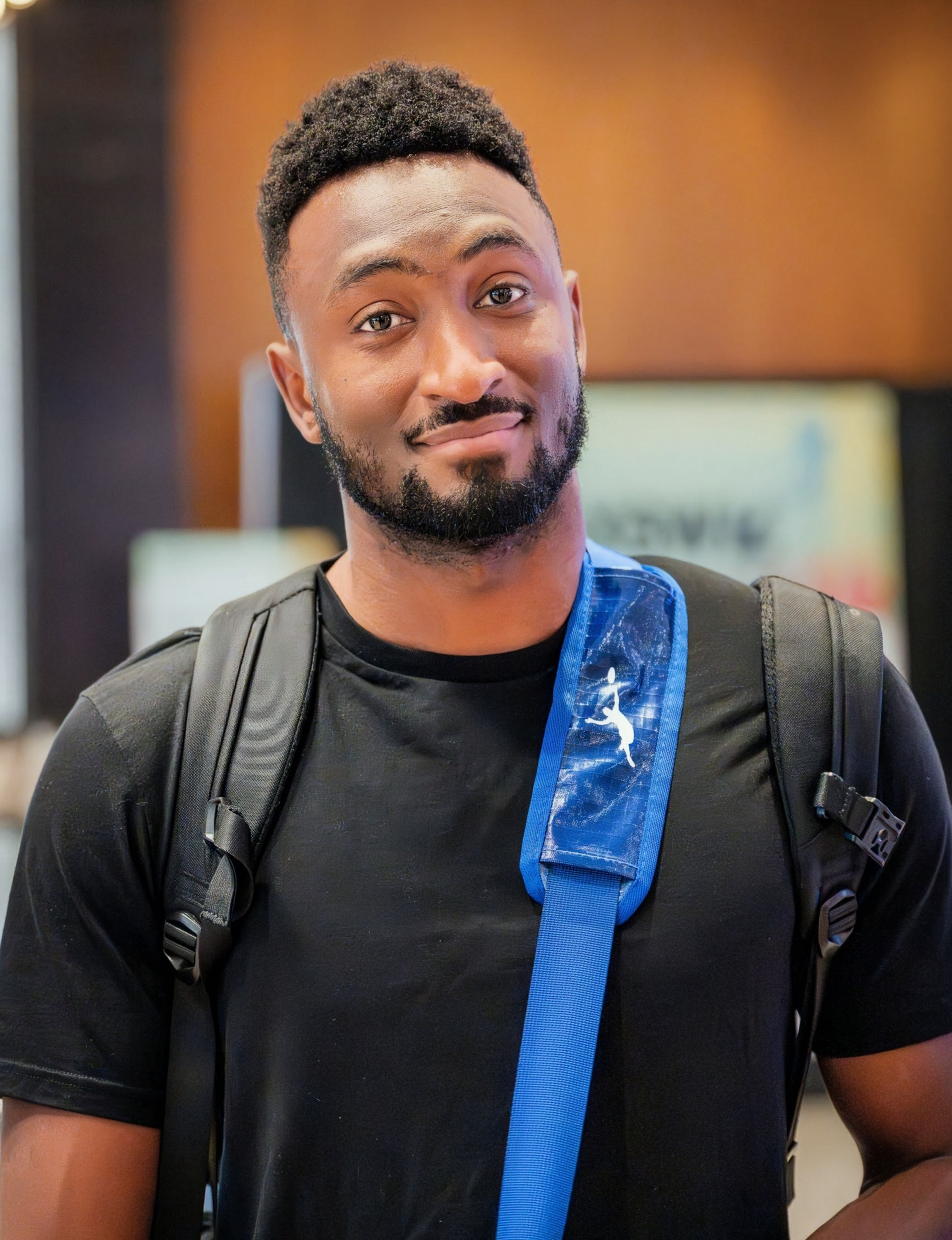
Marques Brownlee at SXSW 2026

Brownlee joined YouTube on March 21, 2008. He first started uploading videos in January 2009, while still in high school, about new products or reviews of products he already owned. He produced his first videos through screencasting.

Review sites have promoted Brownlee's reviews. Engadget promoted the site in January 2012 when they featured his tour of the then-new cloud storage service called Insync. In November 2013, one of Brownlee's most viral videos was posted based on the LG G Flex, where he performed various scratch tests to demonstrate the self-healing ability of the device. In December 2013, Brownlee did an interview with Motorola CEO Dennis Woodside.

Brownlee's video review and scratch test of a rumored 4.7-inch sapphire display for the iPhone 6, uploaded July 7, 2014, gained immediate popularity, being featured on sites such as The Verge, HuffPost, CNET, Time magazine, and others. As of November 2024, the video has gained over 9.2 million views on YouTube and has had over 60,000 likes.

In December 2015, Brownlee interviewed professional NBA basketball player Kobe Bryant. During one of the 2016 Democratic presidential primary debates, YouTube cosponsored a video whereby Brownlee asked the candidates, by video, whether tech companies and the government can find a middle ground over encryption while simultaneously considering rights to privacy and national security.

In April 2018, Brownlee won Shorty Awards Creator of the Decade. In August 2019, Brownlee began co-hosting a technology podcast, Waveform: The MKBHD Podcast. that is commonly referred to as Waveform or WVFRM. The podcast is focused on product reviews and interviews with figures influential in the technology industry.

Retro Tech is a YouTube Original series produced by Vox Media Studios starring Brownlee, which was published on December 2, 2019. In the series, Brownlee interviews fellow YouTube creators and celebrity guests and discusses iconic pieces of technology from the past which have had a significant impact on modern life and culture.

Brownlee reached 10 million subscribers on December 18, 2019, making MKBHD one of the most-subscribed-to technology-focused YouTube channels. As of July 2025, his main channel has more than 20 million subscribers and billions of total views. His secondary channels (WVFRM Podcast, 438,000 subscribers; Auto Focus, 1.08 million subscribers; The Studio, 977,000 subscribers; Waveform Clips, 487,000 subscribers; MKBHD Shorts, 647,000 subscribers) add 3.52 million subscribers and approximately 394.75 million views.

In December 2020, he was honored in the Forbes 30 Under 30 listing in its social media category. In April 2023, Brownlee collaborated with footwear brand Atoms to create the high-top Sneaker 251, named after the duration of his first YouTube video. In February 2024, he joined everyday accessories company Ridge as a board member and chief creative partner.

In May 2024, Brownlee gave a commencement speech at his alma mater, Stevens Institute of Technology, and was awarded the Honorary degree of Doctor of Business Administration.

In 2025, Brownlee participated in the third Creator Classic, a golf event organized by the PGA Tour for YouTube golf influencers.

== Controversies ==
=== Panels ===
In September 2024, Brownlee launched Panels, an iOS and Android app for browsing and downloading hand-picked wallpapers. The app drew widespread criticism from the tech community, mainly for its implementation of a subscription model ($12/month or $50/year) that was deemed overpriced. Other common points of criticism included the presence of in-app ads (for free users), its overall lack of quality, privacy concerns, and allowing AI-generated art to be included on its wallpaper portfolio. He later addressed the criticism, significantly reducing the pricing and fixing most of the other problems. In December 2025, Brownlee announced that the app would be shutting down at the end of the year.

=== Speeding ===
On November 11, 2024, Brownlee published a sponsored review for a DJI action camera that attracted significant backlash regarding a point-of-view shot of him driving at 96 miles per hour (154 km/h) in a neighborhood that had a speed limit of 35 miles per hour (56 km/h). It was also noted that the speedometer was blurred, leading to speculation that Brownlee had deliberately tried to hide the fact. Brownlee received widespread criticism. He removed the driving portion and issued an apology on the social media platform X, admitting to his mistakes, leading to mixed responses.

After the backlash from his self posted video, multiple additional body cam videos emerged of him being previously pulled over for speeding well above the limit, illegal tint and obscuring his license plates.

== YouTube channels ==
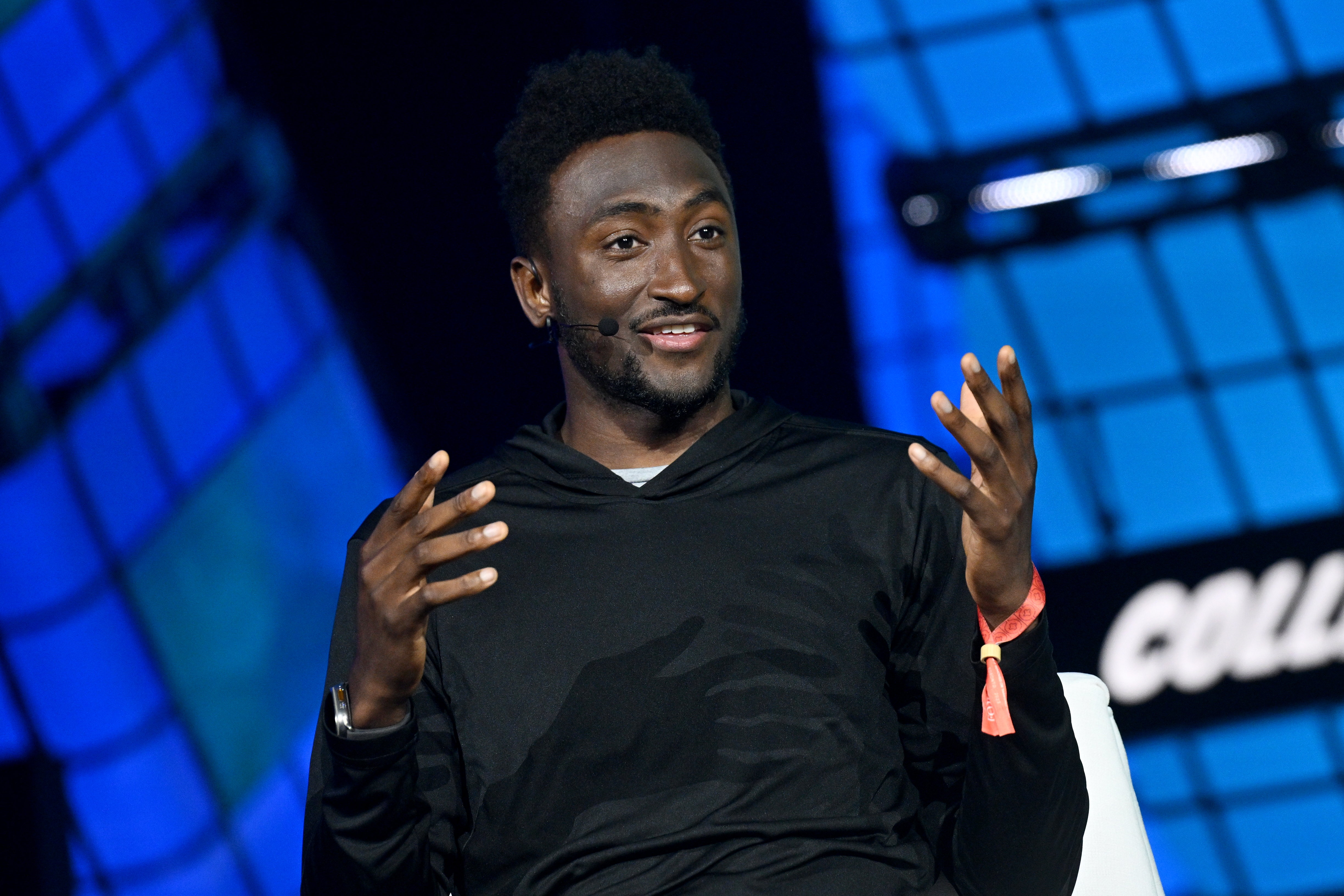
Brownlee speaking at Web Summit's Collision conference in Toronto, 2023

- Marques Brownlee – Brownlee's main channel
- The Studio – behind-the-scenes secondary channel
- WVFRM Podcast – technology podcast
- Waveform Clips – short highlights of Waveform podcast discussions
- Auto Focus – car-focused channel
- MKBHD Shorts

== Personal life ==
Marques Keith Brownlee was born on December 3, 1993, and grew up in Maplewood, New Jersey. He attended Columbia High School, graduating in 2011, and studied at the Howe School at Stevens Institute of Technology, where he majored in business and information technology. Brownlee graduated in May 2015 with a Bachelor of Science degree in Information Systems and became a full-time YouTuber. His videos were produced at his apartment until he moved out in 2016; he now works out of a studio in Kearny, New Jersey.

=== Ultimate Frisbee Association ===
Brownlee is a professional ultimate frisbee player for the New York Empire of the Ultimate Frisbee Association (UFA), who were the UFA champions in 2019, 2022 and 2023. Brownlee previously played for the Philadelphia Phoenix (2017) and Garden State Ultimate (2015–2017). Other previous team engagements include the now-defunct New Jersey Hammerheads, a team belonging to the UFA, and the New York Rumble, which was in the now-defunct league Major League Ultimate.

On July 31, 2022, Brownlee won the WFDF World Ultimate Club Championship with New York PoNY.

== See also ==
- List of YouTubers
