= Waveform (podcast) =

Technology podcast hosted by Marques Brownlee

Waveform: The MKBHD Podcast
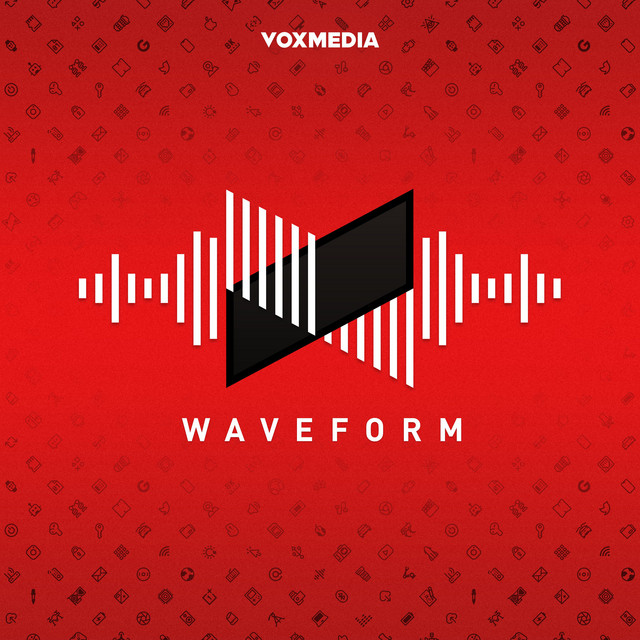
- Genre: Technology
- Language: English

Creative team
- Created by: Marques Brownlee

Cast and voices
- Hosted by: Marques Brownlee; Andrew Manganelli; David Imel

Music
- Theme music composed by: 20Syl

Production
- Production: Adam Molina; Ellis Rovin
- Length: 45 – 130 minutes

Technical specifications
- Video format: YouTube
- Audio format: MP3

Publication
- No. of episodes: 362 (as of July 3, 2026)
- Original release: July 31, 2019
- Provider: Apple Podcasts; Spotify; YouTube Music

Waveform: The MKBHD Podcast (also referred to as Waveform or WVFRM) is a technology podcast hosted by American YouTuber Marques Brownlee, alongside Andrew Manganelli and David Imel. The podcast focuses on consumer electronics news, industry trends, and discussions related to videos published on Brownlee's YouTube channel. Episodes frequently include interviews with technology creators and industry figures.

== Background ==
Marques Brownlee, creator of the technology-focused MKBHD YouTube channel, launched Waveform in 2019 to provide additional commentary beyond his video content, including behind-the-scenes insights and more informal discussion.

The podcast was initially launched in partnership with Studio71. Andrew Manganelli, a long-time collaborator and producer for the MKBHD channel, serves as co-host, while David Imel later joined as a regular co-host. The podcast is produced by Adam Molina and Ellis Rovin.

Waveform is part of the Vox Media Podcast Network. The first episode, a short announcement, was released on July 31, 2019, followed by the first full-length episode on August 9, 2019.

== Format and distribution ==
Waveform episodes are typically released on a weekly schedule and range from approximately 45 to 130 minutes in length, with monthly bonus episodes. The podcast initially launched as an audio-only show distributed on platforms including Apple Podcasts, Spotify, and Google Podcasts.

On May 7, 2021, the podcast expanded to include a full video format with the launch of the Waveform YouTube channel, making each episode available in both audio and video formats. Short-form clips are also distributed through the Waveform Clips YouTube channel.

Episodes typically include discussion of recent technology news, analysis of consumer electronics products, and recurring segments such as trivia games or typing challenges at the end of episodes.

== Guests ==
The podcast regularly features guest appearances from technology creators and industry figures. Early guests included Quinn Nelson of Snazzy Labs. Notable guests have included Craig Federighi, Carl Pei, Chris Cox, Panos Panay, and executives from Maingear. An extended interview with Mark Zuckerberg was also released separately following an edited version on the MKBHD YouTube channel.

== Episodes ==
By November 2025, the podcast had released over 300 episodes, reflecting its weekly release schedule and continued growth since its launch in 2019.

== Reception ==
Waveform has ranked among the top technology podcasts on platforms such as Apple Podcasts. Brownlee was a finalist for Best Podcaster at the 12th Shorty Awards in 2020 for his work on the show.
