= Taylorcraft Aircraft =

American airplane manufacturer

Taylorcraft Aviation
- Company type: Subsidiary
- Industry: General aviation
- Founded: 1935; 91 years ago in Bradford, Pennsylvania
- Founder: Clarence Gilbert Taylor
- Headquarters: Brownsville, Texas, United States
- Parent: Taylorcraft 2000 LLC
- Website: www.taylorcraft.com

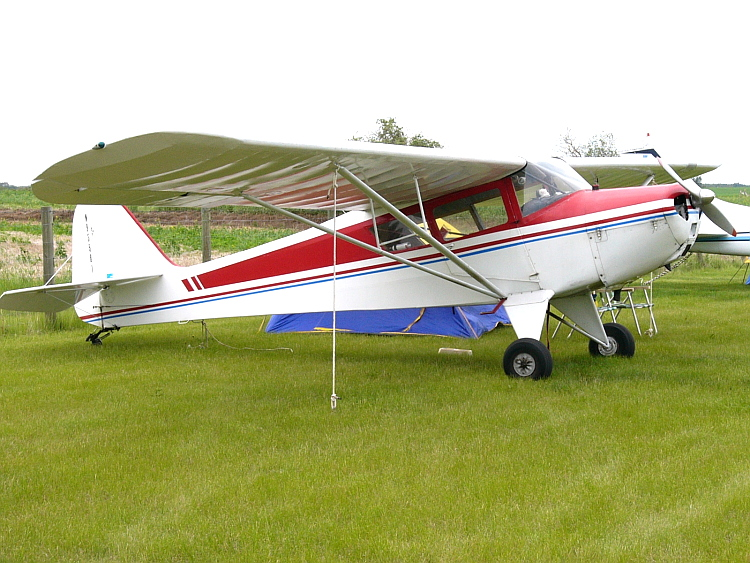
1946 model Taylorcraft BC-12-D

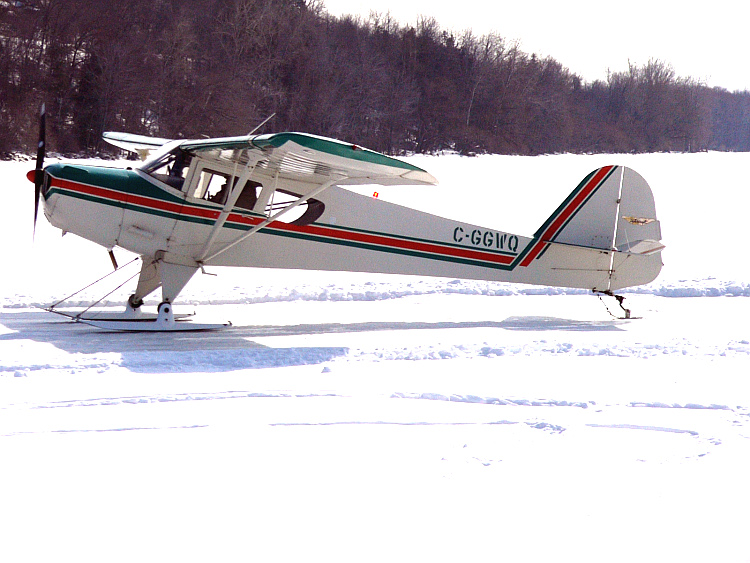
1975 model Taylorcraft F-19 on skis

Taylorcraft Aviation is an American airplane manufacturer that has been producing aircraft for more than 90 years in several locations.

The company builds small single-engined airplanes. The Taylorcraft design is a conventional layout: high-wing, fabric-covered, two-seat aircraft. The basic design has remained unchanged since 1936, and this design is sold as a personal sport aircraft today.

== History ==
The designer, Clarence Gilbert Taylor, a self-taught aeronautical engineer born in Rochester, New York, to parents who emigrated from England, can be called the father of private aviation in America, as he designed the original Taylor Cub in 1931 at Bradford, Pennsylvania. Taylor, along with his brother Gordon, formed Taylor Brothers Aircraft Corporation – slogan; "Buy Your Airplane Taylor Made" – in Rochester, New York in 1926, offering a two-seat high-winged monoplane called the Taylor Chummy, priced at $4,000. The Chummy failed to sell, and after Gordon died flying another Taylor design in 1928, Clarence moved to Bradford, Pennsylvania, where the townsfolk had offered him a new factory at the local airfield plus $50,000 to invest in the company. One of the investors was William Thomas Piper, who had made his money from oil wells. Piper bought out Taylor's share in Taylor Aircraft which was later renamed Piper Aircraft.

Taylor vowed to build a personal aircraft superior to the Cub so he formed his own company in 1935 as Taylor-Young Airplane Company, renamed Taylorcraft Aviation Corporation in 1939.

In 1936 Taylor rented facilities at Pittsburgh-Butler Airport and first manufactured the "Taylorcraft" plane. That summer, the firm moved to Alliance, Ohio when the city offered the use of the former Hess-Argo biplane (28 built between 1929 and 1932) factory rent free for a period of six months with an option to buy for $48,000.

During World War II, light aircraft were used for training, liaison, and observation purposes. Taylorcraft's DCO-65 model was called the L-2 by the United States Army Air Forces and served alongside the military version of the Piper Cub. Taylorcraft Aeroplanes Ltd., a subsidiary based in Thurmaston, Leicestershire, England, developed the Taylorcraft Model 'D' and the Auster Mk. I through Mk. V, which became the backbone aircraft of the British AOP (air observation post) and the three Canadian AOP squadrons, No. 664 Squadron RCAF, No. 665 Squadron RCAF, and No. 666 Squadron RCAF.

=== Taylorcraft Inc. ===
In the fall of 1946 production was halted following a fire in the Taylorcraft factory at Alliance, Ohio and the company went into bankruptcy. In 1949 C.G. Taylor bought the assets from the former company, and started a new company Taylorcraft, Inc. at Conway, Pennsylvania. The company restarted production of the BC-12D Traveller and the BC-12-85D Sportsman. The company produced few aircraft; the type certificates were sold to Univair and production was halted.

=== Taylorcraft Aviation Corporation ===
In 1971 the Taylorcraft Aviation Corporation, owned by Charles Feris put the Model 19 back into production as the F-19 Sportsman and added the F-21 model. Feris died in 1976 and the production continued at a low rate until 1985. Charles Ruckle bought the company in 1985 and he moved the operation to Lock Haven, Pennsylvania, where it produced 16 aircraft before it went bankrupt in 1986 and the company was offered for sale.

=== Aircraft Acquisition Corporation ===
The West Virginia-based company was set up to put one new model in certification, and develop a distribution network. The assets were sold to key investor East Kent Capitol.

=== 2008 Repossession ===
On February 21, 2008, the company was repossessed by its former owner, Taylorcraft 2000 LLC. The previous owners had taken orders for new struts for existing aircraft to alleviate a repetitive inspection Airworthiness Directive and is delivering struts to customers. The design's type certificates, drawings, jigs, templates and parts have been put up for sale.

== Aircraft ==
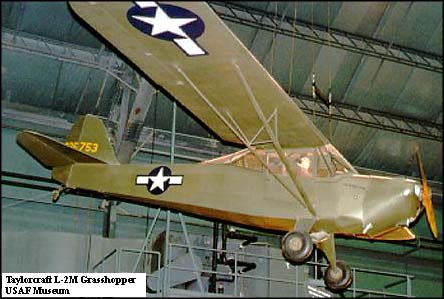
Taylorcraft L-2M at the National Museum of the United States Air Force

| Model name | First flight | Number built | Type |
|---|---|---|---|
| Taylor Cub | | | Single engine two seat monoplane |
| Taylorcraft A | | | Single engine two seat monoplane |
| Taylorcraft B | | | Single engine two seat monoplane |
| Taylorcraft D | 1941 | 3,170 | Single engine two seat monoplane |
| Taylorcraft L-2 | | 1,980+ | Military version of Model D |
| Taylorcraft LBT | 1944 | 25 | Glide bomb |
| Taylorcraft TG-6 | | 250 | Glider version of L-2 |
| Taylorcraft 15 | | 31 | Single engine four seat monoplane |
| Taylorcraft 16 | | 1 | Single engine monoplane |
| Taylorcraft 18 | | 1 | Single engine four seat monoplane |
| Taylorcraft F-19 Sportsman | 1973 | 120 | Single engine two seat monoplane |
| Taylorcraft 20 | 1955 | 38 | Single engine four seat monoplane |
| Taylorcraft F-21 | | 43 | Single engine two seat monoplane |
| Taylorcraft F22 | | | Single engine two seat monoplane |
| Taylorcraft Sport | | | Single engine two seat monoplane|- |
