= Taylorcraft D =

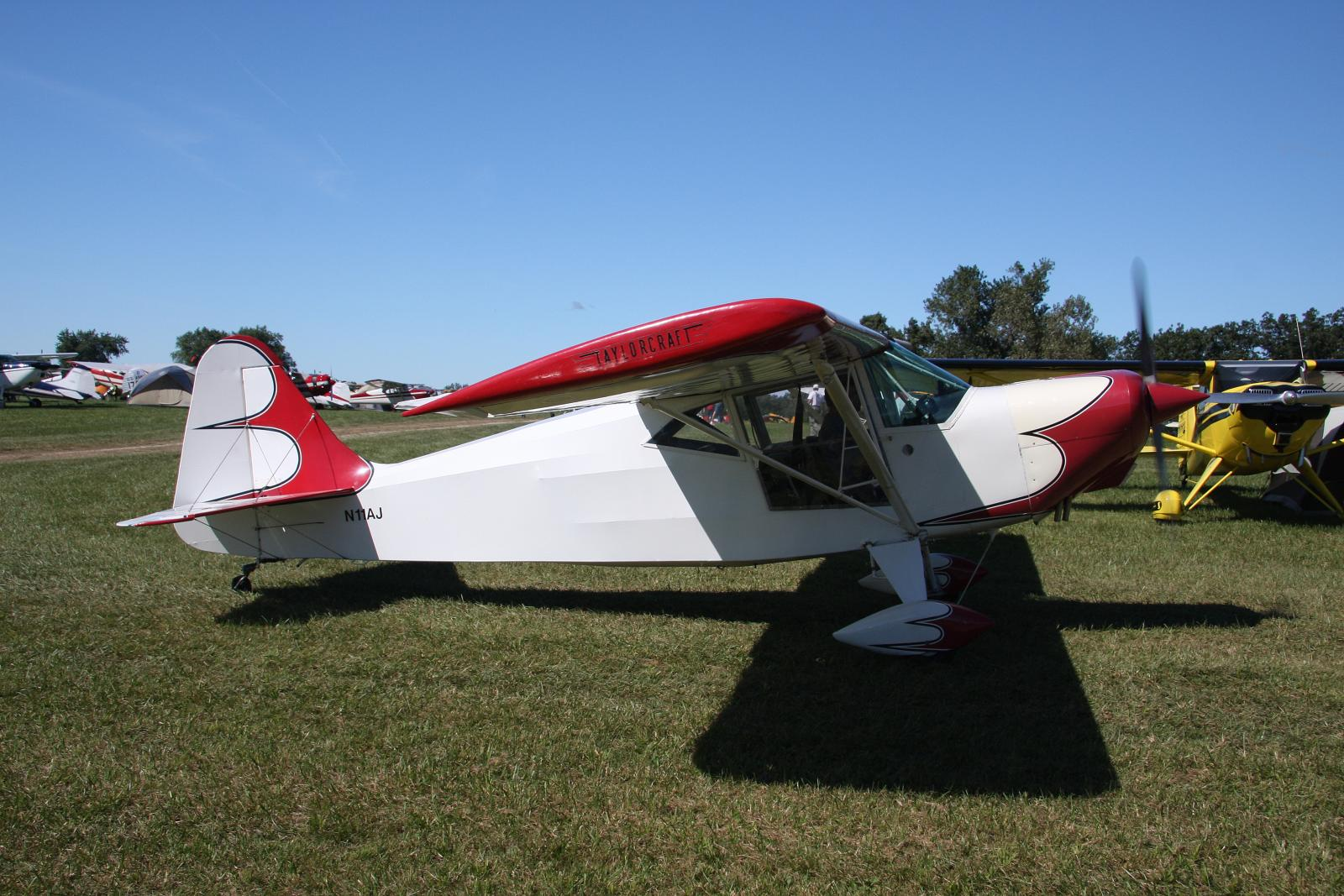
- A Taylorcraft DCO-65

General information
- Type: light aircraft
- National origin: USA
- Manufacturer: Taylorcraft Aviation
- Number built: 2,348 + 822 in England

History
- First flight: February 1941
- Developed into: Taylorcraft L-2

The Taylorcraft Model D is a light aircraft of the US manufacturer Taylorcraft Aviation from the early 1940s.

== History ==
In the years 1940-41, the demand for training machines increased steadily, especially due to inauguration of the government-sponsored Civilian Pilot Training (CPTP). Although Taylorcraft was able to sell a larger number of the side-by-side Model B to the civilian contractors who operated flight schools approved under the program, tandem-seat aircraft were preferred by the military. In 1940, more than half of all machines used for the CPTP were manufactured by the Piper Aircraft Company, whose J-3 had this seating arrangement. To better capture this new training market, Taylorcraft developed the Model D, which took up the tandem seat layout of the earlier Taylor J-2 which Piper's J-3 was patterned after. After 200 machines were constructed, production was converted to military orders for the Taylorcraft O-57 liaison plane, re-designated L-2 in April 1942.

The first version was the DC-65, which was publicly presented in February 1941 and received the Type Approval on November 25, 1941. The standard engine was the Continental A65-8, but a Franklin 4AC-176 (DF-65) or a Lycoming O-145-B2 (DL-65) could also be installed. To identify the equipment with single or dual ignition, the letters S or D have been relocated (eg DL-65S for single-ignition and DL-65D for dual-ignition). The dimensions differed only slightly from those of the model B, only the span was reduced by about 18 cm due to the narrower cabin and the length was increased by 23 cm.

== Construction ==
As with all pre-war Taylorcraft aircraft, the fuselage structure consisted of welded steel tubing, covered in fabric. Taylorcraft tried to utilise as many parts of the Model B as possible, however, this was only partially successful, as the main structural components were not interchangeable between the two patterns and the wing ribs were made of aluminum instead of wood. Because of the anticipated heavier load in the training operation, the airframe also received reinforcements. The tanks were in the wings and fed a collection tank behind the engine. The engine was enclosed in a partial cowling leaving the cylinder heads uncovered in the air flow. The machine could be flown from either seat.

In the specifications of the designers John Hutmacher and Cameron Lusty was the requirement for a good all-round visibility, whereupon they lowered the upper strap of the trunk compartment (Longeron) at shoulder level of the pilot. When C.G. Taylor saw the first specimen in this form, he ordered it to be undone to restore the typical outward appearance of a Taylorcraft machine. The designers did this by placing a plywood fitting on the upper Longeron. In the later military version L-2A, this "turtle hump" was then removed and replaced by a transparent cladding.

== Variants ==
DC
65 hp (48 kW) Continental A65
DF
65 hp (48 kW) Franklin 4AC
DL
65 hp (48 kW) Lycoming O-145
Auster AOP Mk.I
130 hp (97 kW) Cirrus Major.
Auster AOP Mk.II
130 hp (97 kW) Cirrus Major.
Auster AOP Mk.III
130 hp (97 kW) Cirrus Major.
Auster AOP Mk.IV
125 hp (93 kW) Lycoming O-290.
Auster AOP Mk.V
125 hp (93 kW) Lycoming O-290.
O-57
Original designation, re-designated as L-2 in the Liaison series.
L-2
L-2A with open cowling, L-2M with closed cowling.

== Specifications (DL) ==
Data from U.S. Civil Aircraft Vol. 8

General characteristics

- Crew: 2
- Length: 22 ft 9 in (6.93 m)
- Wingspan: 35 ft 5 in (10.80 m)
- Height: 7 ft 0 in (2.13 m)
- Wing area: 180 sq ft (17 m^{2})
- Airfoil: NACA 23012
- Empty weight: 720 lb (327 kg)
- Gross weight: 1,200 lb (544 kg)
- Fuel capacity: 14 US gal (12 imp gal; 53 L)
- Powerplant: 1 × Lycoming O-145-B2 4-cylinder horizontally opposed air-cooled piston engine, 65 hp (48 kW)
- Propellers: 2-bladed wooden fixed pitch propeller

Performance

- Maximum speed: 102 mph (164 km/h, 89 kn)
- Cruise speed: 92 mph (148 km/h, 80 kn)
- Stall speed: 36 mph (58 km/h, 31 kn)
- Range: 270 mi (430 km, 230 nmi)
- Service ceiling: 14,000 ft (4,300 m)
- Rate of climb: 550 ft/min (2.8 m/s)

== See also ==
- List of aircraft types
