= Taylorcraft L-2 =

1941 liaison aircraft family

L-2 Grasshopper
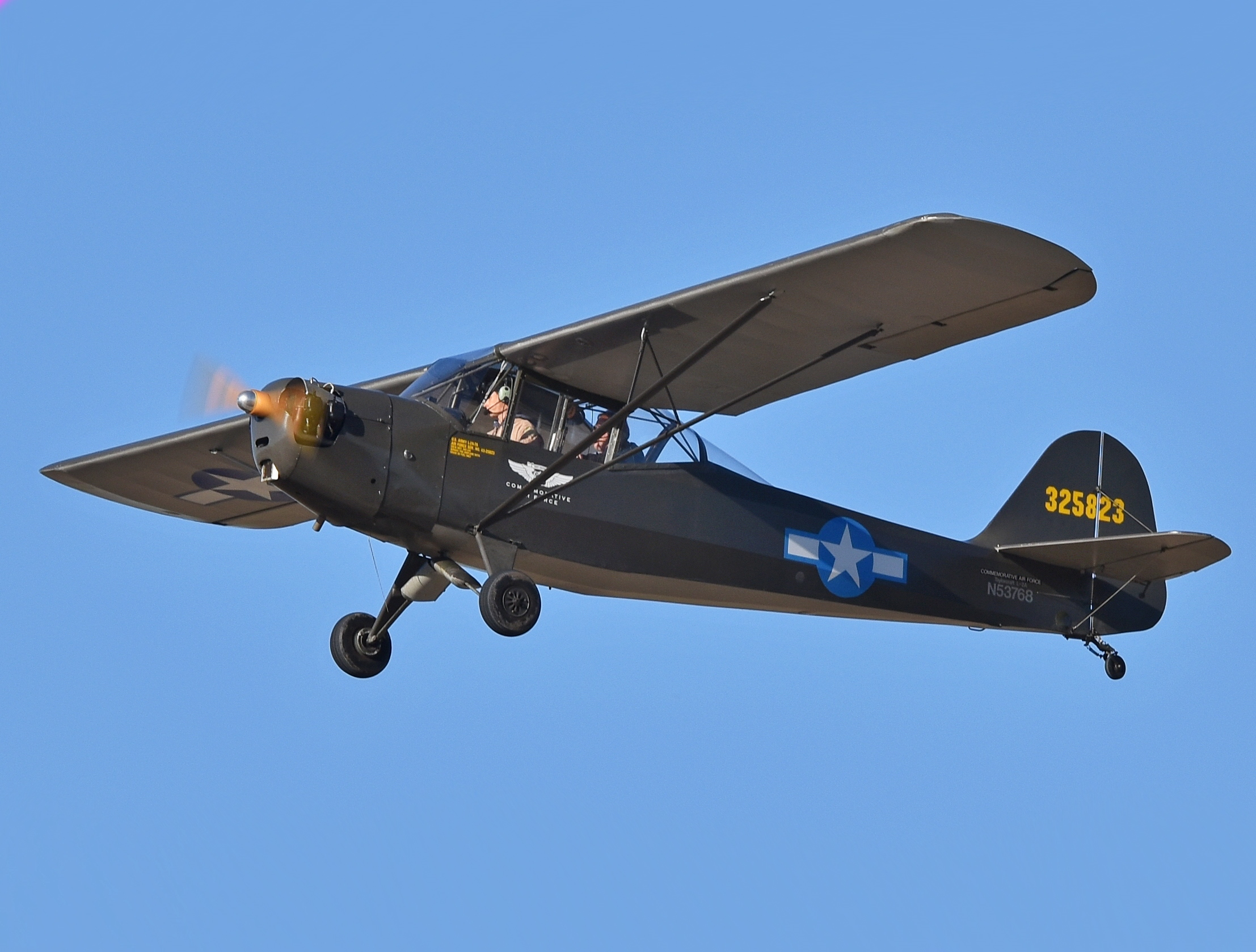
- Taylorcraft L-2M of the Commemorative Air Force

General information
- Type: Observation and liaison
- National origin: United States
- Manufacturer: Taylorcraft
- Primary user: United States Army Air Forces
- Number built: 1,984

History
- Introduction date: 1941
- Developed from: Taylorcraft D

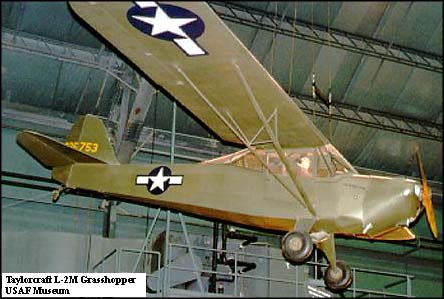
Taylorcraft L-2M at the National Museum of the United States Air Force

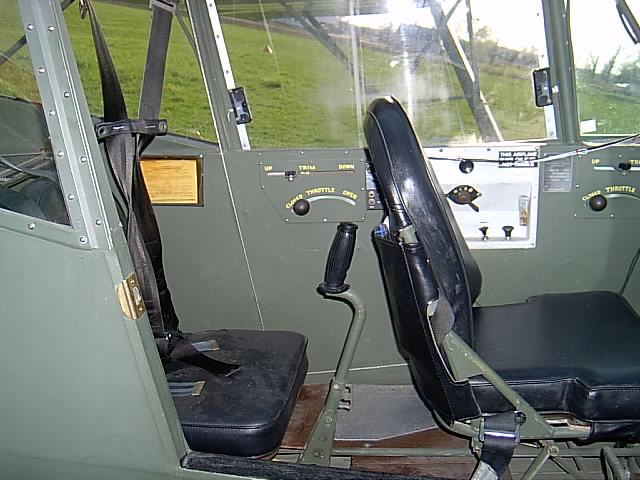
Interior of Taylorcraft L-2M N52347

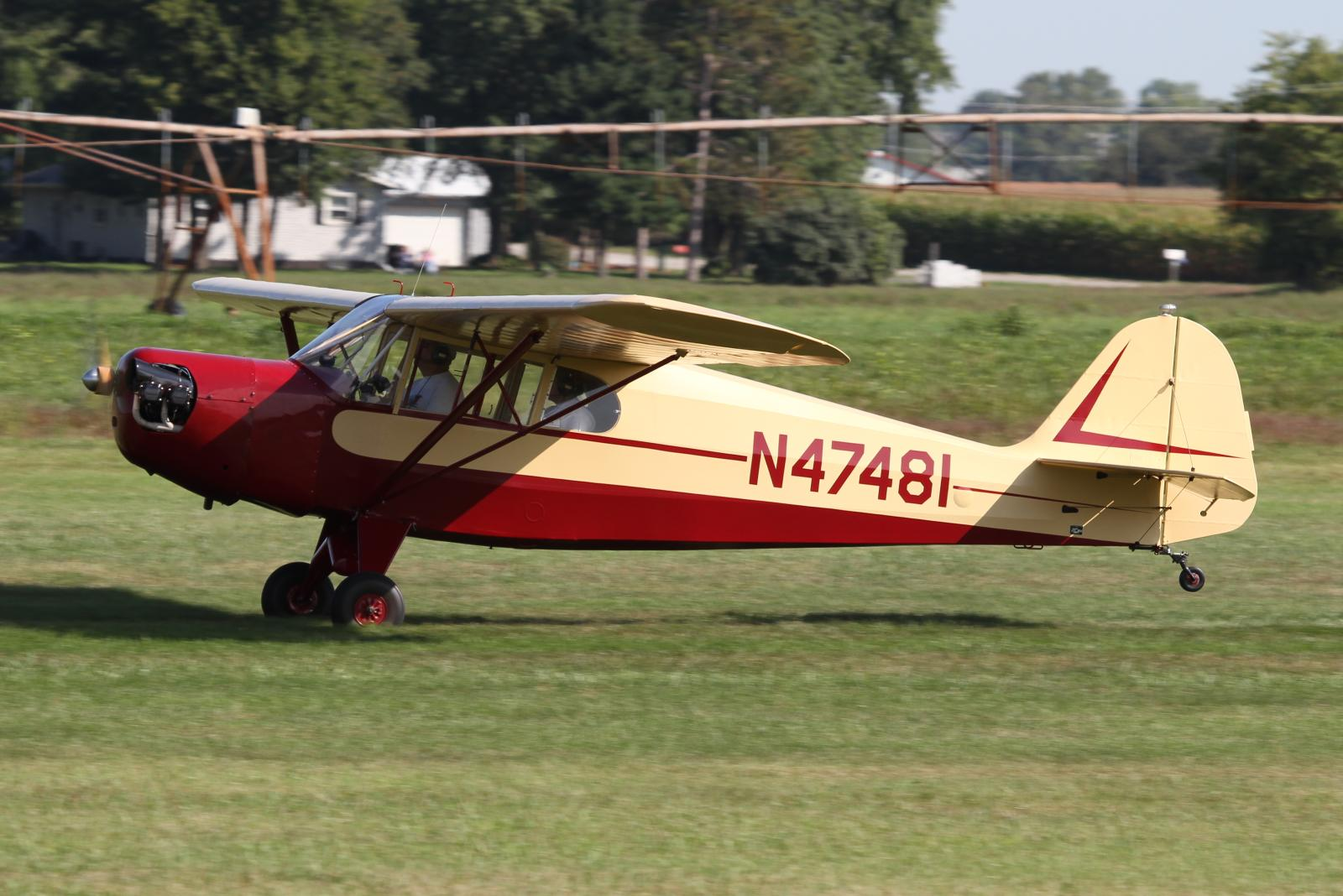
Taylorcraft DCO-65

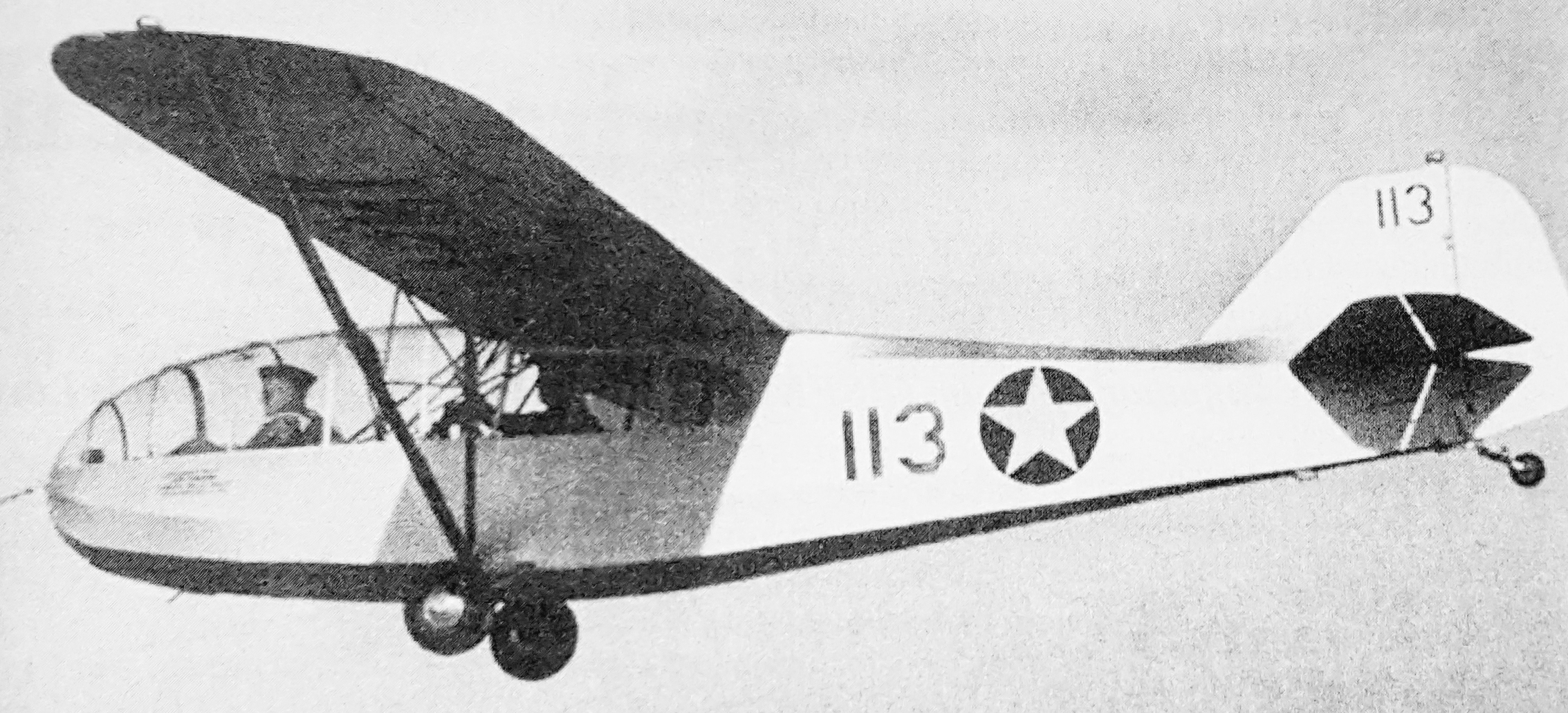
A Taylorcraft TG-6 three-seat training glider

The Taylorcraft L-2 Grasshopper is an American observation and liaison aircraft built by Taylorcraft for the United States Army Air Forces in World War II.

== Design and development ==
In 1941 the United States Army Air Forces ordered four Taylorcraft Ds with the designation YO-57. They were evaluated in the summer of 1941 during maneuvers in Louisiana and Texas where they were used for support purposes such as light transport and courier. General Innis P. Swift, commander of the 1st Cavalry Division, coined the 'grasshopper' name after witnessing a bumpy landing. This led to a production order under the designation O-57 Grasshopper. In March 1942, the designation was changed to L-2 Grasshopper.

In World War II, the Army Ground Forces began using the L-2 and other liaison aircraft in much the same manner as the observation balloon was used in France during World War I—spotting enemy troop and supply concentrations and directing artillery fire on them. It was also used for liaison (communication) and transport duties and short-range reconnaissance that required airplanes able to land and take off from roads, open fields, and hastily prepared landing strips. The L-2 was primarily used in a training role within the United States and few saw overseas deployment.

Postwar, several L-2s were converted for civilian use and are operated by private pilot owners in the United States as the Model DCO-65. Several are still airworthy in 2021.

The L-2 series meet the standards for light-sport aircraft (other than the L-2M, which has a gross weight rating five pounds over the 1,320-lb limit), thus can be flown by pilots holding the Sport Pilot Certificate.

== Variants ==
YO-57
Military version of the Taylorcraft Model D, four for evaluation with a 65hp YO-170-3 and tandem seating, later became O-57 then L-2.
O-57
Production version with minor changes and a 65hp O-170-3 engine and tandem seating, 20 built, re-designated L-2 in 1942.
O-57A
O-57 with modified cabin and military radios and an observers seat that could face backwards, 336 built, re-designated L-2A
L-2
O-57 re-designated in 1942, a further 50 built.
L-2A
O-57A re-designated in 1942, a further 140 built.
L-2B
L-2A with modifications for artillery spotting with a 65hp Continental A65-8 engine and tandem seating, 490 built.
L-2C
13 Taylorcraft Model DC65 with tandem seating, impressed into Army service.
L-2D
One Taylorcraft Model DL65 with tandem seating, impressed into Army service.
L-2E
Two impressed Taylorcaft Model DF65s with a 65hp Franklin 4AC-176-B2 and tandem seating into Army service.
L-2F
Seven impressed Taylorcraft Model BL65s with side-by-side seating and a 65hp O-145-B1 engine, one originally designated UC-95.
L-2G
Two impressed Taylorcraft Model BFs with side-by-side seating and a 50hp Franklin 4AC-150-50 engine.
L-2H
Nine impressed Taylorcraft Model BC12-65s with side-by-side seating and a 65hp Continental A65-7 engine.
L-2J
Five impressed Taylorcraft Model BL12-65s with side-by-side seating and a 65hp O-145-B1 engine.
L-2K
Four impressed Taylorcraft Model BF12-65s with side-by-side seating and a 65hp Franklin 4AC-176-B2 engine.
L-2L
Single impressed Taylorcraft Model BF60 with side-by-side seating and a 60hp Franklin 4AC-171 engine.
L-2M
L-2A with close-fitting engine cowls and wing spoilers and tandem seating, 900 built.
TG-6
Model ST.100 three-seat training glider variant with enlarged fin area, wing spoilers and a simpler landing gear, 250 built.
LNT-1
U.S. Navy version of TG-6
XLNT-2
Modified LNT-1 for Glomb trials.
UC-95
One impressed Taylorcraft Model BL65s with side-by-side seating and a 65hp O-145-B1 engine, re-designated L-2F.

== Operators ==
France

- French Navy

Haiti

- Haiti Air Corps

Netherlands

- Royal Netherlands East Indies Army Air Force - Postwar

United States

- United States Army Air Forces

== Surviving aircraft ==
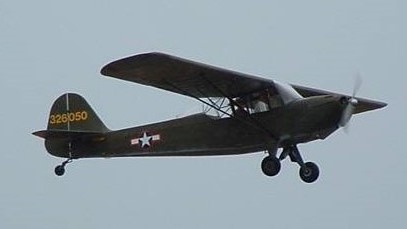
L-2M flying with the Texas Air Museum in Slaton, Texas.

- 43-25823 – L-2M airworthy with the Commemorative Air Force.
- 43-26050 – L-2M airworthy at the Texas Air Museum in Slaton, Texas.

== Aircraft on display ==
- 42-35872 – L-2A on static display at the US Army Aviation Museum in Fort Novosel, Alabama.
- 43-26110 – L-2M on static display at the Pima Air & Space Museum in Tucson, Arizona.
- 43-26433 – L-2M on static display at the Aerospace Museum of California in McClellan, California.
- 43-26592 – L-2M on static display at the National Museum of the United States Air Force in Dayton, Ohio.
- 43-26104 – L-2M on static display at the Alaska Aviation Museum in Anchorage, Alaska.
- L-2 on display at the Fargo Air Museum in Fargo, North Dakota.

== Specifications (Taylorcraft L-2A) ==
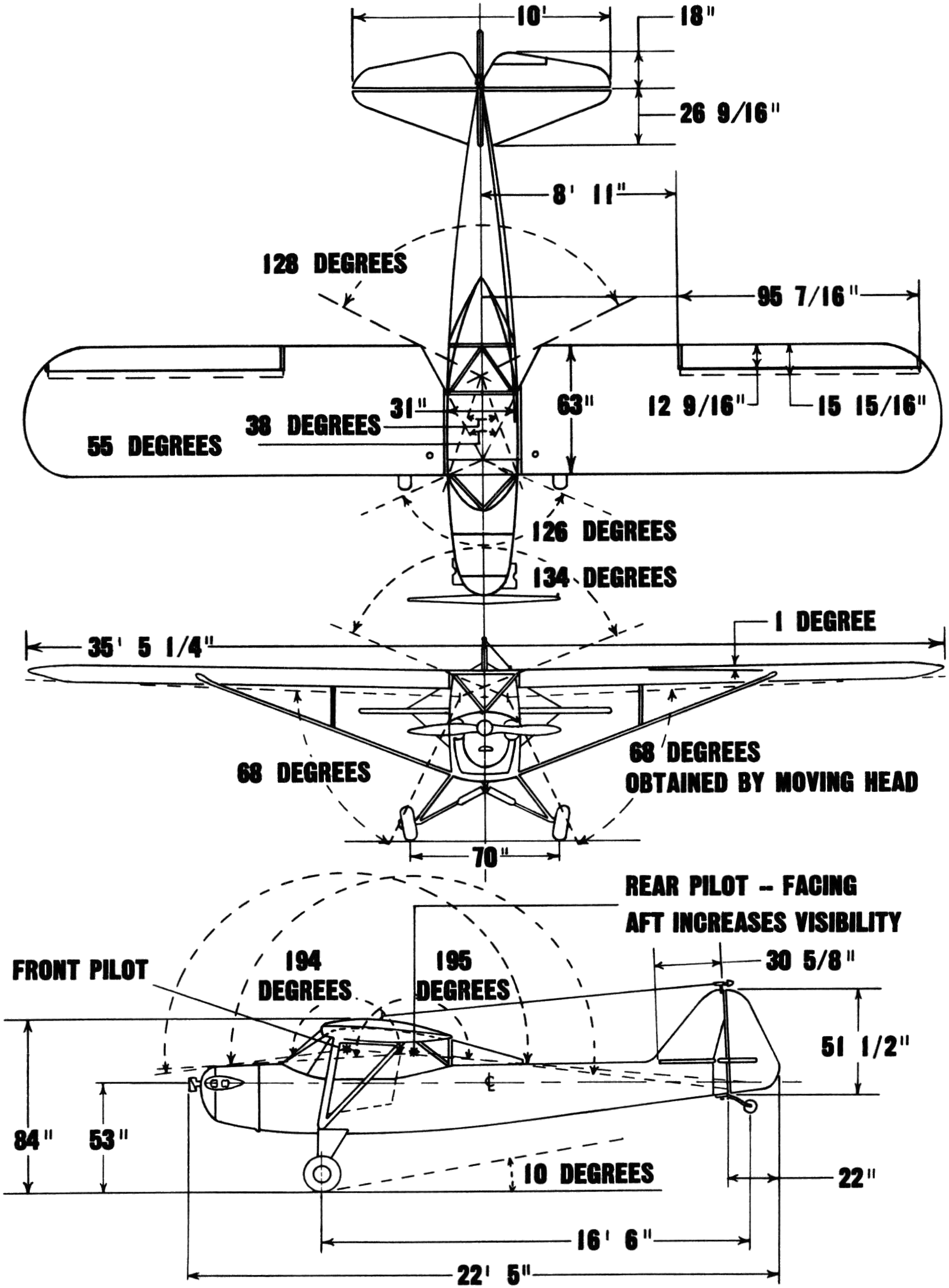
3-view line drawing of the Taylorcraft L-2 Grasshopper

Data from Pilots Flight Operating Instructions, Army Model L-2, L-2A, L-2B, and L-2M Airplanes, T.O. No. 01-135DA-1, 1944 & The Taylorcraft Story, 1992

General characteristics

- Crew: Two, pilot and observer
- Capacity: 425 lb (193 kg)
- Length: 22 ft 9 in (6.9 m)
- Wingspan: 35 ft 5 in (10.8 m)
- Height: 6 ft 8 in (2.0 m)
- Wing area: 181 sq ft (16.8 m^{2})
- Airfoil: NACA 23012
- Empty weight: 875 lb (397 kg)
- Gross weight: 1,300 lb (590 kg)
- Max takeoff weight: 1,300 lb (590 kg)
- Powerplant: 1 × Continental O-170-3 4-cylinder air-cooled engine, 65 hp (48 kW)

Performance

- Maximum speed: 92 mph (148 km/h, 80 kn)
- Cruise speed: 83 mph (134 km/h, 72 kn) at 2,150 rpm
- Stall speed: 43 mph (69 km/h, 37 kn) power on
- Never exceed speed: 140 mph (225 km/h, 120 kn)
- Range: 303 mi (488 km, 263 nmi) at 2,000 rpm
- Service ceiling: 12,000 ft (3,658 m)
- Rate of climb: 395 ft/min (2.01 m/s) L-2A
- Wing loading: 7.18 lb/sq ft (35.1 kg/m^{2})

Avionics

- RCA AVR-20A radio

== See also ==
Aircraft of comparable role, configuration, and era

- Taylorcraft Auster
- Piper J-3 Cub and its L-4 military version

Related lists

- List of aircraft of World War II
- List of military aircraft of the United States
