= Taylorcraft F-19 Sportsman =

Model F-19 Sportsman
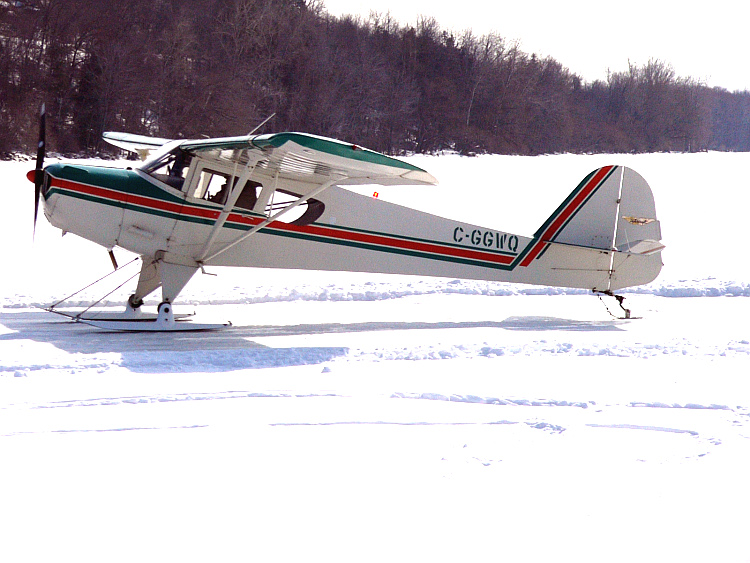
- F-19 Sportsman on skis

General information
- Type: Two-seat cabin monoplane
- National origin: United States
- Manufacturer: Taylorcraft Aviation Corporation
- Number built: 120

History
- Introduction date: 1973
- First flight: 1973
- Variant: Taylorcraft F-21

The Taylorcraft Model F-19 Sportsman is a two-seat cabin monoplane designed and built by Taylorcraft Aircraft as the first new product of the reformed Taylorcraft Aviation Company. The F-19 fuselage is a fabric-covered 4130 steel tube framework; its wing is fabric-covered with a wooden spar. It has conventional landing gear and a tractor configuration 100 hp (75 kW) Continental O-200 engine.

== Development ==
C.G. Taylor and his brother formed the Taylor Brothers Aviation Corporation in 1929, which had produced several thousand light single-engines by the time it went bankrupt in 1946. It emerged in 1947 as Taylorcraft Inc. and produced light airplanes until 1958, when it ceased production. In 1968 a new company, Taylorcraft Aviation Corporation, was formed, primarily to provide support for the thousands of airplanes still in the field. However, in 1973 this company geared up to produce an updated Taylorcraft B, now named the Model F-19 Sportsman. It was similar to the Model B but incorporated more power, which resulted in better performance. Production continued until early 1980, when the company chose to switch to the higher-powered Model F-21.

== Specifications ==
Data from Mondey, p. 235.

General characteristics

- Crew: 1 pilot
- Capacity: 1 passenger
- Length: 22 ft 1.25 in (6.74 m)
- Wingspan: 36 ft 0 in (10.97 m)
- Height: 6 ft 6 in (1.98 m)
- Wing area: 183.71 sq ft (17.07 m^{2})
- Aspect ratio: 7.05
- Empty weight: 900 lb (408 kg)
- Gross weight: 1,500 lb (680 kg)
- Powerplant: 1 × Continental O-200 , 100 hp (75 kW)

Performance

- Maximum speed: 127 mph (204 km/h, 110 kn) at sea level
- Cruise speed: 115 mph (185 km/h, 100 kn)
- Range: 400 mi (644 km, 350 nmi)
- Service ceiling: 18,000 ft (5,485 m)
