= Taylorcraft B =

American monoplane

Model B
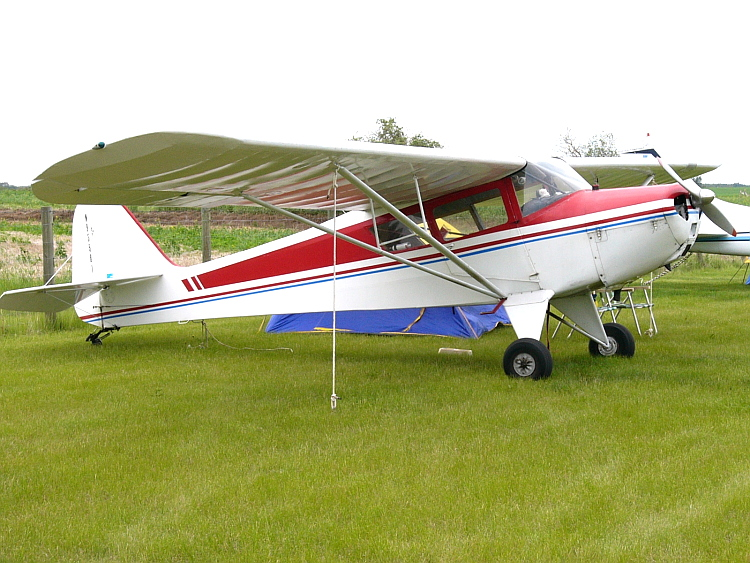
- 1946 model Taylorcraft BC-12-D

General information
- Type: Light aircraft
- Manufacturer: Taylorcraft Aircraft
- Designer: Clarence Gilbert Taylor

History
- Developed from: Taylorcraft Model A
- Developed into: Taylorcraft Auster

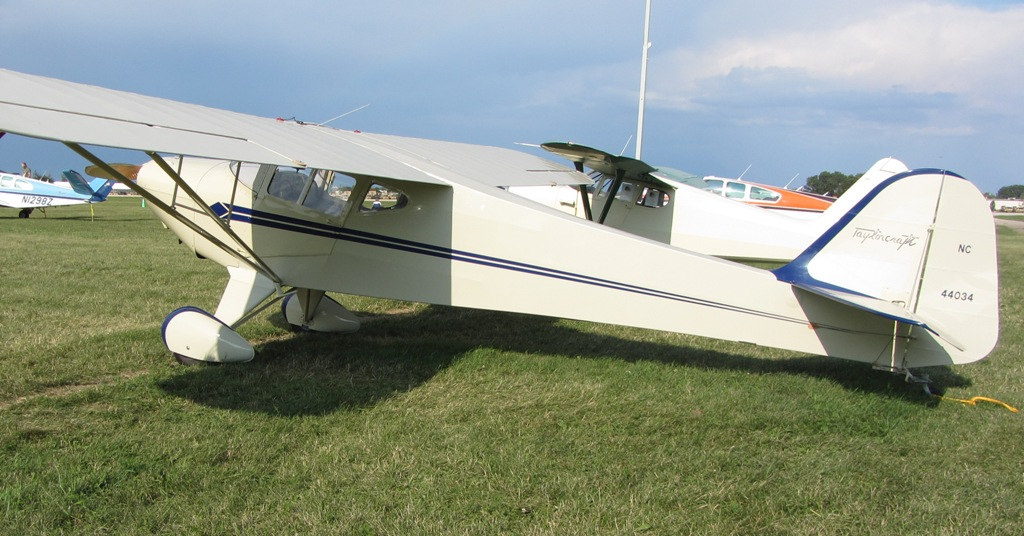
Taylorcraft BC-12-D

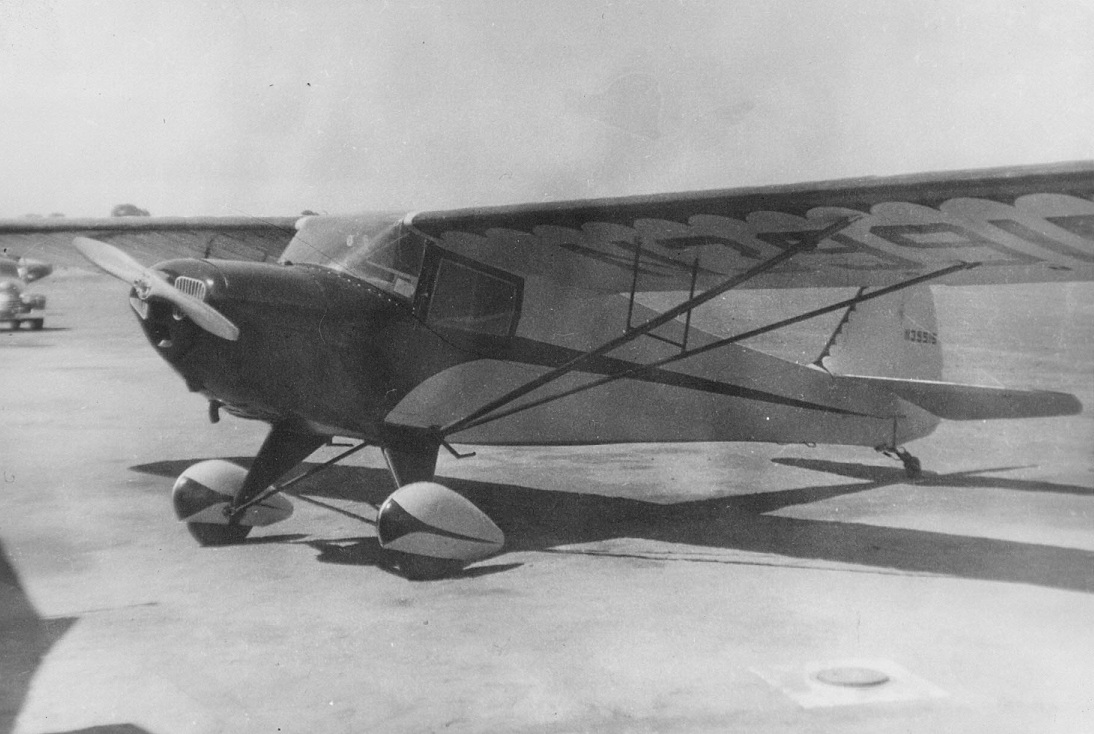
Taylorcraft BC-12-D 1946 Model with custom painted fabric

The Taylorcraft B is an American light, single-engine, high-wing general aviation monoplane, with two seats in side-by-side configuration, that was built by the Taylorcraft Aviation Corporation of Alliance, Ohio.

== Production and construction ==
The Model B was constructed in large numbers during the late 1930s and early 1940s and was available for delivery from the factory as a land plane and a floatplane. Like many light aircraft of its day, the fuselage is constructed of welded steel tubing and covered with doped aircraft fabric. The wings are braced using steel-tube struts.

== Operational history ==
The Model B was mainly bought by private pilot owners. Large numbers were flown in the United States, and many were sold to owners in Canada and several overseas countries, including those in Europe. Many are still active in 2022.

== Variants ==
BC
1938 - Based on the Model A with a 50 hp Continental A-50-1 engine and modified wing construction, also known as the BC-50
BCS
1939 - Seaplane variant of the BC
BC-65
1939 - Model BC with a 65 hp Continental A-65-1 engine.
BCS-65
1939 - Seaplane variant of the BC-65.
BC-12-65 (L-2H)
1941 - As BC-65 except for minor structural changes and added elevator trim tab and a Continental A-65-7 engine.
BCS-12-65
1941 - Seaplane variant of the BC-12-65
BC-12D Twosome
1945 - also marketed as the Traveller; postwar production version of the BC-12-65 with a Continental A-65-8 engine with alternate tail surface, alternate one piece window and other minor changes. In 1950, a Special Deluxe version was introduced alongside the Standard model. The Special Deluxe featured better visibility and brakes, redesigned doors, and extra luggage room.
BCS-12D
1946 - Seaplane variant of the BC-12D
BC-12D1
1946 - Marketed as the Ace. A stripped-down, budget version of the BC-12-D with left hand door, parking brake, right-hand wing tank, step, glove box, spinner, and right-hand controls removed.
BCS-12D1
1946 - Seaplane variant of the BC-12D1

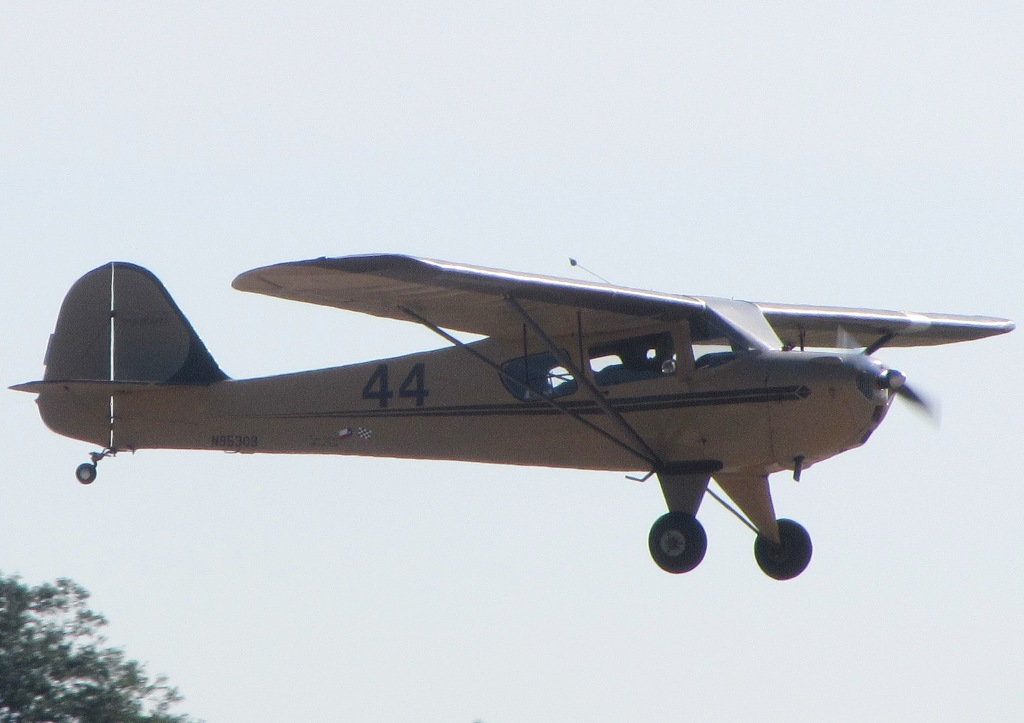
1946 Taylorcraft BC-12-85

BC-12D-85
1948 - A BC-12D fitted with an 85 hp Continental C85-8F engine and increased power and gross weight. From 1950, Taylorcraft offered a Custom Deluxe version, which featured better visibility and brakes, redesigned doors, and extra luggage room. The same year, the Sportsman was introduced as the very top of the Taylorcraft line. In addition to the features of the Custom Deluxe, the Sportsman had a special hand-rubbed paint finish, and was equipped with modern conveniences such as an electric starter, a generator, a stall-warning indicator, and navigation lights.
BCS-12D-85
1948 - Seaplane variant of the BC-12D-85.
BC-12D-4-85
1949 - A BC-12D-85 fitted with an extra rear side window and a Continental C85-12F engine.
BCS-12D-4-85
1949 - Seaplane variant of the BC-12D-4-85.
Model 19 Sportsman
1951 - Development of the BC-12D-4-85, still with Continental C85-12F engine but with gross weight increased to 1500 lb. Revived in 1973 by the reformed Taylorcraft as the F-19 Sportsman with 100 hp Continental O-200 engine.
BF (L-2G)
1938 - 40 hp Franklin 4AC-150 engine.
BFS
1939 - Seaplane variant of the BF.
BF-60
1939 - As BF with a 60 hp Franklin 4AC-171 engine.
BFS-60
1939 - Seaplane variant of the BF-60.
BF-65
1941 - A BF with a 65 hp Franklin 4AC-176-B2 engine, also known as the BF-12-65 (L-2K).
BFS-65
1941 - Seaplane variant of the BF-65
BL
1938 - with a 50 hp Lycoming O-145-A1 engine, also known as the BL-50
BLS
1939 - Seaplane variant of the BL.

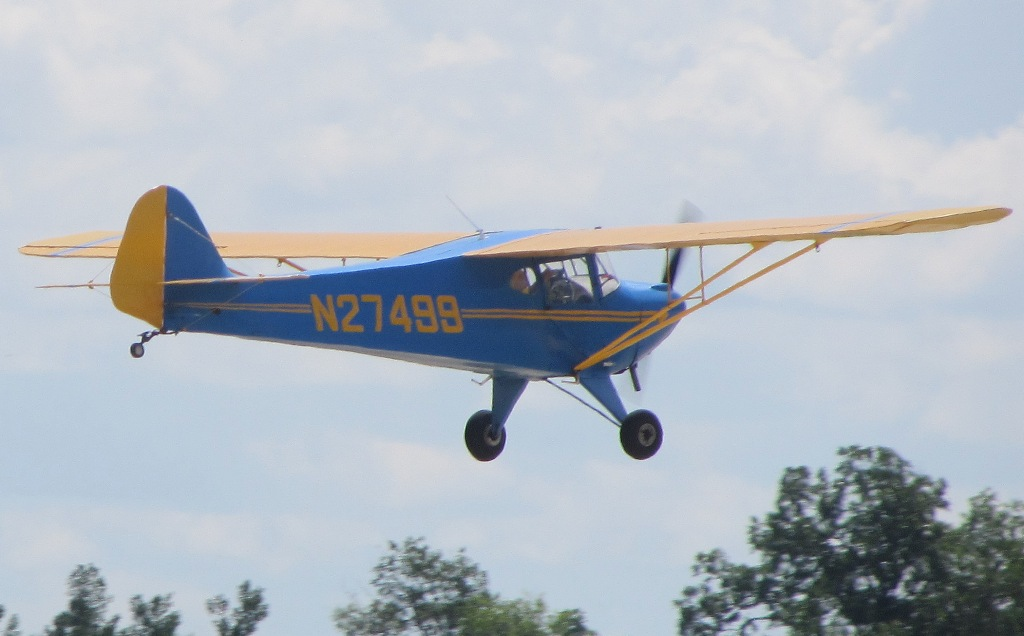
BL-65

BL-65 (L-2F)
1939 - A BL with a 65 hp Lycoming O-145-B1 engine.
BLS-65
1939 - Seaplane variant of the BL-65.
BL-12-65 (L-2J)
1941 - A BL-65 with a Lycoming O-145-B1 engine and minor structural changes and added elevator trim.
BLS-12-65
1941 - Seaplane variant of the BL-12-65.

== Notable accidents and incidents ==
- November 24, 2021 – American YouTuber Trevor Jacob parachuted out of his BL-65 while piloting it after feigning an engine failure, leaving the plane to crash into the ground. The Federal Aviation Administration deemed his actions intentional and reckless and revoked his pilot certificate.

== Specifications (Taylorcraft 19) ==
Data from Plane and Pilot

General characteristics

- Crew: one
- Capacity: one passenger
- Empty weight: 860 lb (390 kg)
- Gross weight: 1,500 lb (680 kg)
- Fuel capacity: 18 U.S. gallons (68 L; 15 imp gal)
- Powerplant: 1 × Continental C-85 four-cylinder horizontally opposed aircraft engine, 85 hp (63 kW)
- Propellers: 2-bladed metal

Performance

- Maximum speed: 120 mph (190 km/h, 100 kn)
- Cruise speed: 110 mph (180 km/h, 96 kn)
- Stall speed: 38 mph (61 km/h, 33 kn)
- Range: 300 mi (480 km, 260 nmi)
- Service ceiling: 17,000 ft (5,200 m)
- Rate of climb: 700 ft/min (3.6 m/s)

== See also ==
- Civilian Pilot Training Program

Related development

- Taylorcraft Auster

Aircraft of comparable role, configuration, and era

- Aeronca 11 Chief
- Aeronca 50 Chief
- Cessna 120 and 140
- Ercoupe
- Luscombe 8
- Piper J-3
- Piper J-4
