= Ridge (company) =

American wallet manufacturer

The Ridge Wallet LLC
- Trade name: Ridge
- Type: Private
- Founded: 2013; 13 years ago Los Angeles, California
- Founder: Paul Kane; Daniel Kane
- Headquarters: Santa Monica, California
- Key people: Sean Frank (CEO); Connor MacDonald (CMO); Marques Brownlee (board member)
- Products: Wallets, men's rings, backpacks, luggage, everyday carry accessories
- Website: ridge.com

Ridge (previously The Ridge) is a wallet and accessories manufacturer. Ridge was founded in 2013 by father and son Daniel and Paul Kane. The company initially relied on crowdfunding campaigns to finance the manufacturing of its products. The company's wallet patent has been the subject of litigation, which began in 2020.

Ridge was established in 2013 by Daniel and Paul Kane, who launched a Kickstarter campaign for Ridge Wallet as their flagship product. The campaign gained significant popularity and met its initial funding goal. The company has since expanded its product line to include rings, backpacks, and other accessories, along with new versions of its original wallet.

== Products ==
The company's primary product is a minimalist wallet made from materials such as aluminum, titanium, and carbon fiber. It features technology to prevent electronic pickpocketing and RFID skimming. Ridge Wallet has consistently been featured in the best of lists. The company also sells bags, phone cases, and knives. In 2021, the company introduced customization options to its products and, in 2023, began selling luggage. In 2024 they started selling men's rings.

== Litigation ==
Ridge is currently the plaintiff in three separate district court patent litigations and one patent and trade dress litigation in the International Trade Commission. Ridge accuses defendant Mosaic Brands, Inc. (doing business as Storus) of patent infringement in the District Court for the Central District of California. The lawsuit is the result of Ridge's counterclaim of patent infringement in a litigation originally brought by Mosaic. While Mosaic's suit was dismissed with prejudice, Ridge's suit continues following a successful reversal of a prior invalidity finding by the Federal Circuit. Ridge has also accused Mountain Voyage Company in the District Court of Colorado and Bemmo, Inc. in the Eastern District of New York of infringing its patent. In addition, Ridge sued several defendants for infringing on its patent and Ridge's trade dress in the International Trade Commission.
