= Lompoc Airport =

Airport in Lompoc, California, United States

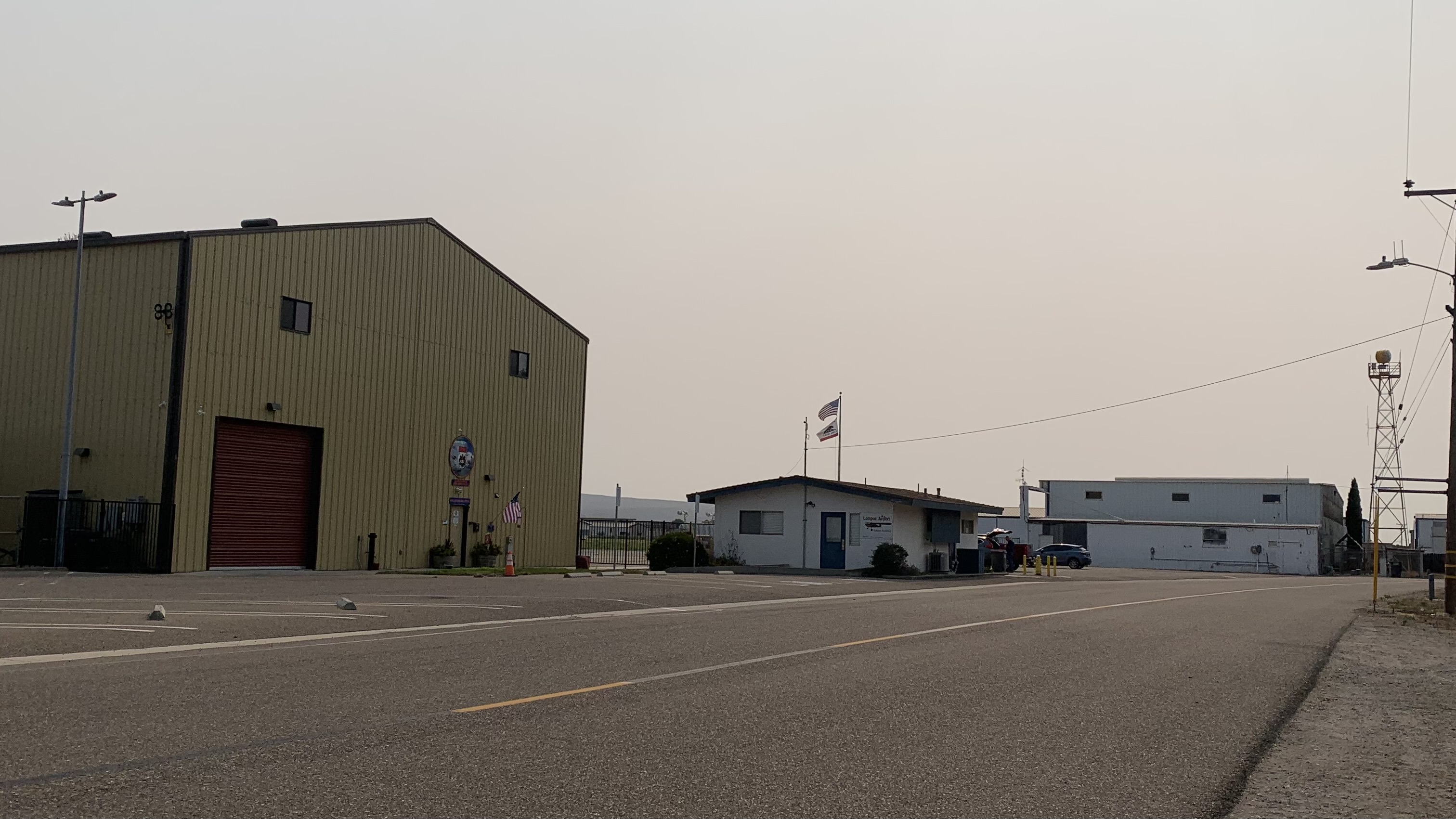
- IATA: LPC; ICAO: KLPC

Summary
- Airport type: Public
- Operator: City of Lompoc
- Location: Lompoc, California
- Elevation AMSL: 88 ft / 26.8 m
- Coordinates: 34°39′56.23″N 120°28′03.01″W
- Interactive map of Lompoc Airport

Runways
Direction	Length		Surface
Direction	ft	m	Surface
7/25	4,600	1,402	Asphalt
- Source: Federal Aviation Administration

Lompoc Airport (IATA: LPC, ICAO: KLPC) is a public airport located just north of the city of Lompoc in Santa Barbara County, California, United States.

== Facilities and aircraft ==
Lompoc Airport covers an area of 914 acres (370 ha) at an elevation of 88 feet (27 m) above mean sea level. It has one runway with an asphalt surface: 7/25 is 4,600 by 100 feet (1,402 x 30 m).

For the 12-month period ending December 11, 2020, the airport had 30,000 general aviation aircraft operations; an average of 82 general aviation per day. 41 single-engine and 1 multi-engine aircraft were based at the airport during that time.

Skydiving operations are held daily during daylight hours at Skydive Santa Barbara.

== World War 2 ==
Near the Lompoc Airport the US Navy built the Naval Auxiliary Air Facility Lompoc base for US Navy lighter than air airships during World War II. The bases construction started in December 1942 and opened with 500 x 1000 foot asphalt landing mat, two blimp mooring masts, and housing for 25 officers and 72 enlisted men. The blimps patrolled the coast for enemy ships. On August 13, 1943, five days after opening, while ground crews manoeuvred ship K-29 in fog in the morning on Circle #2, the blimp's tail pendants hit a high-voltage power line and 11,000 volts arcs through the ship. Four men holding the metal handling bars on the control car were electrocuted and a fifth crew member was seriously burned. The power company was supposed to have moved this power line hazard but had not. These were the only fatalities at the base.
