= Taylorcraft F-21 =

F-21
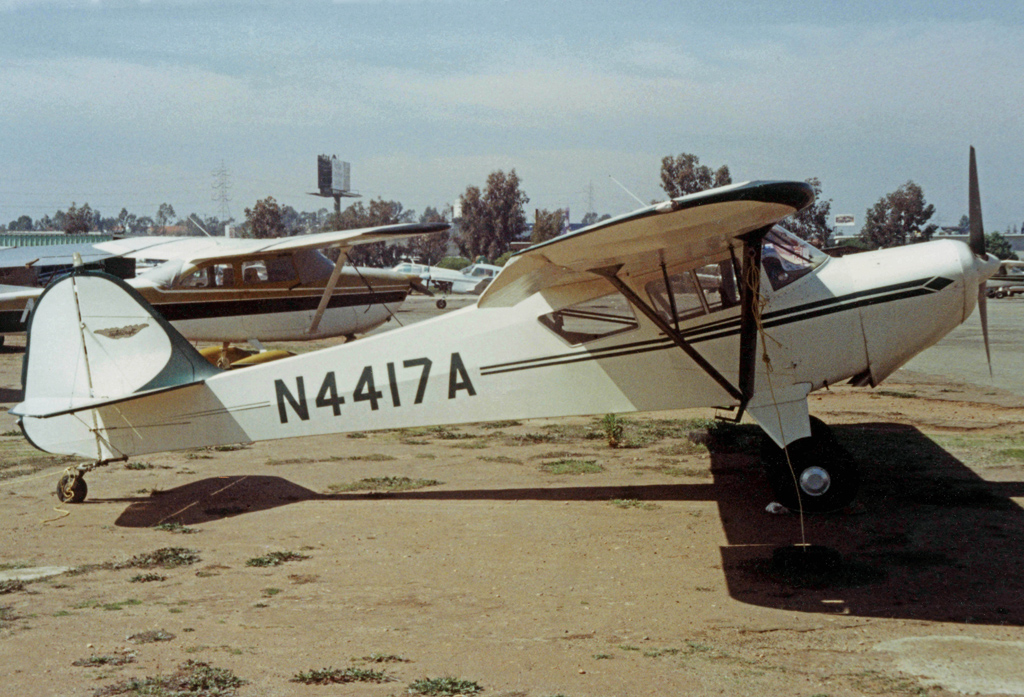
- Taylorcraft F-21A, built in 1984, at Montgomery Field, San Diego in 1990.

General information
- Type: Light aircraft
- National origin: United States
- Manufacturer: Taylorcraft Aircraft
- Status: in service
- Primary user: private pilot owners
- Number built: 43

History
- Manufactured: 1980-1990
- Introduction date: 1980
- Developed from: Taylorcraft F-19 Sportsman

The Taylorcraft F-21 is a high-wing American-built certified light aircraft developed from earlier Taylorcraft designs.

== Development ==
The Taylorcraft F-21 is a single-engine, high-wing, conventional-gear aircraft. It was developed from the earlier F-19 model with a larger 118 hp engine and an updated FAA-type certificate.

== Production ==
43 examples of the F-21 basic design were built between 1980 and 1990. These were designated the F-21, F-21A and F-21B, with minor changes in design.

== Operational history ==
- A 1988 Taylorcraft F-21 was displayed as an award in the Stardust Casino, Las Vegas. Per the U.S. Civil Aircraft Register, 34 F-21 models were active with private pilot owners in 2014, of which 18 were F-21, 3 were F-21A and 13 were F-21B models.

== Variants ==
F-21
Conventional gear with 118 h.p. Lycoming O-235-C engine. 1,500 lb TOGW. 22 built 1980-1985.
F-21A
F-21 with fuselage fuel tank deleted and 40 gal fuel capacity in two wing tanks. 6 built 1982-1984.
F-21B

F-21B in 2026

F-21 with 42 gal total fuel capacity and 1,750 TOGW. New wing spars and aluminium under-fuselage skinning. 15 built 1985-1990.

A further development was the F-22:

F-22A
Tricycle gear
F-22C STOL 180
Tricycle gear 180hp - 1 built

== Specifications (F-21B) ==
Data from Jane's All the World's Aircraft 1988–89

General characteristics

- Crew: 2
- Length: 22 ft 1 1/4 in (6.737 m)
- Wingspan: 36 ft 0 in (10.97 m)
- Height: 6 ft 6 in (1.98 m)
- Wing area: 183.71 sq ft (17.067 m^{2})
- Airfoil: NACA 23012
- Empty weight: 1,025 lb (465 kg)
- Max takeoff weight: 1,750 lb (794 kg)
- Fuel capacity: 42 US gal (35 imp gal; 160 L) total
- Powerplant: 1 × Textron Lycoming O-235-L2C air-cooled flat-four engine, 118 hp (88 kW)
- Propellers: 2-bladed Sensenich 72CK-O-50 fixed-pitch metal propeller, 6 ft 0 in (1.83 m) diameter

Performance

- Maximum speed: 125 mph (201 km/h, 109 kn)
- Stall speed: 48 mph (77 km/h, 42 kn) (power off)
- Never exceed speed: 147 mph (237 km/h, 128 kn)
- Range: 732 mi (1,178 km, 636 nmi) (75% power)
- g limits: +4.4 / -1.76
- Rate of climb: 750 ft/min (3.8 m/s)
- Takeoff run to and landing run from 50 ft (15 m): 425 ft (130 m)

== See also ==
Related development

- Taylorcraft F-19 Sportsman

== Bibliography ==
- Simpson, R.W., The General Aviation Handbook, 2005, Midland Publishing, Hinckley, ISBN 1-85780-222-5
- Taylor, John W.R. (1988). Jane's All The World's Aircraft 1988–89. Coulsdon, UK: Jane's Defence Data. ISBN 0-7106-0867-5.
