= Highland Cemetery (Lock Haven, Pennsylvania) =

Historic cemetery in Clinton County, Pennsylvania

Coordinates: 41°08′15″N 77°27′44″W

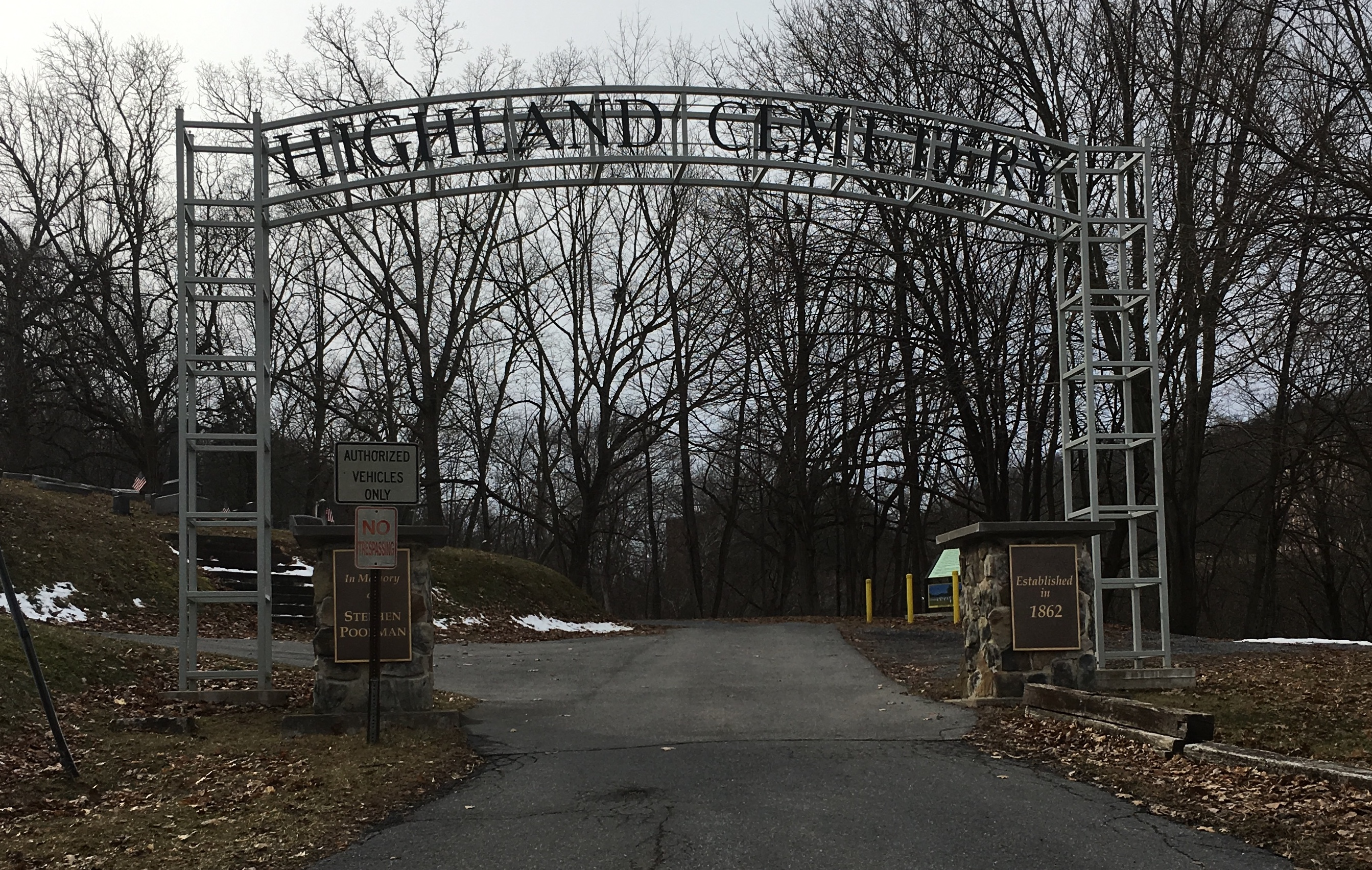

Details
- Established: 1862
- Location: Lock Haven, Pennsylvania, U.S.
- No. of graves: Over 9,000
- Find a Grave: Highland Cemetery

Pennsylvania Historical Marker
- Type: Roadside
- Designated: April 11, 1999

Highland Cemetery is a cemetery located in Lock Haven, Clinton County, Pennsylvania, United States. Opened in 1867, the cemetery has over 9,000 graves, a public mausoleum and numerous private family mausolea. The cemetery has multiple unique and one of a kind graves and tombs. in 2015 and 2016 local police investigated multiple burglaries and vandalism cases at the cemetery in early 2017 five local residents were arrested in connection to the crimes.

== Notable people buried at Highland ==
- Jim Brown, (d. 1908), Major League Baseball player
- Davey Dunkle, (d. 1941), Major League Baseball player
- Benjamin Faunce (1873–1949), American pharmacist and businessman
- Albert Cole Hopkins, (d. 1911), politician
- Levi A. Mackey, (d. 1889), politician
- Alexander McDonald, (d. 1903), politician
- William T. Piper, (d. 1970), businessman and founder of Piper Aircraft
- William T. Piper Jr., (d. 2007), businessman, second president of Piper Aircraft and son of Piper Sr.
- Allison White, (d. 1886), politician
- Tom Poorman. (d. 1905) American Professional Baseball Player
