= William Piper (disambiguation) =

William Piper may refer to:

- William Piper (1774–1852), American politician
- William Piper (abolitionist) (1786–1870), African-American former slave, conductor on the Underground Railroad and husband of Amelia Piper
- William Adam Piper (1826–1899), American politician
- William G. Piper (1906–1976), American politician
- William T. Piper (1881–1970), American airplane manufacturer, founder of Piper Aircraft
  - William T. Piper Jr. (1911–2007), American businessman, president of Piper Aircraft
