= Max Conrad =

American aviator

Max Arthur Conrad Jr. (January 21, 1903 – April 3, 1979, in Summit, New Jersey) known as the "Flying Grandfather", was a record-setting aviator. In the 1950s and 1960s, he set nine official light plane world records, three of which still stand as of 2013. For his efforts, he was awarded the Louis Blériot medal in 1952 and the prestigious Harmon Trophy in 1964. Winona Municipal Airport, also known as Max Conrad Field, in Winona County, Minnesota, is named in his honor. Conrad was nominated for the Carnegie Medal for heroism for flying his Piper aircraft in 50-60 mph winds during and after the 1940 Armistice Day Blizzard to locate and help rescue stranded duck hunters throughout the Mississippi River backwaters near Winona. Over several flights, Conrad dropped tins with whiskey, sandwiches, cigarettes, and matches to marooned survivors struggling to survive in temperatures below 10 °F (−12 °C). Conrad helped direct rescue boats to survivors via his flight paths. Dozens of hunters died as a result of the unexpected storm that saw temps drop from more than 60 °F (16 °C) to single digits and dumped up to 24 inches (61 cm) of snow.

== Biography ==
Conrad was born on January 21, 1903, in Winona, Minnesota, where he later attended Cotter High School, graduating in 1921.

In 1929, while Conrad operated Conrad Flying Service, a woman was killed at Frontenac, Minnesota, when she walked into the spinning propeller of Conrad's aircraft. He had jumped out to try and stop her but was himself struck in the head. Conrad took months to recover.

One of Conrad's students during 1940 was Arthur "Art" Donahue who, as a teenager, learned to fly at Conrad Flying Service. After learning how to fly and becoming Minnesota's youngest commercially certificated pilot at the age of 19, Donahue worked for Conrad helping to run the flight school until he left to join the Royal Air Force. He became one of only seven American pilots to fly for the RAF during the Battle of Britain, earned ace status and was later killed in combat over the English Channel.

Conrad's brother was killed in a plane crash.

On March 24, 1957, Conrad left Logan International Airport for his 25th Atlantic crossing.

== Record flights ==
=== Flights from Casablanca ===
From June 2–4, 1959 Conrad flew Comanche 250 N110LF non-stop from Casablanca, Morocco to Los Angeles, a distance of 7,668 mi (12,340 km). This distance record (for aircraft in the 1750-3000 kilogram weight class) stood until 1987. With interior seats replaced by fuel tanks, the aircraft was loaded 2,000 lb (910 kg) over its production gross weight limit when Conrad took off from Casablanca. N110LF is displayed at the Mid-America Air Museum in Liberal, Kansas.

A few months later, on November 24, 1959, Conrad set the record (that still stands) for the 1000–1750 kg weight class, flying from Casablanca to El Paso, Texas, in the same aircraft fitted with a smaller engine, with a flight time of 56 hours. At the time he also held the 500–1000 kg record, set on his transcontinental Pacer flight in 1952.

=== Around-the-world record ===
Having chosen a westward route that exceeded the length of the Earth's equatorial circumference, Conrad left Miami in a PA-23 Aztec named New Frontiers (registration N4445P) on February 27, 1961, and touched down in Miami on March 8. His average speed was 123.19 mph (198.26 km/h). He made stops in Long Beach, California, Honolulu, Wake Island, Guam, Manila, Singapore, Bombay, Nairobi, Lagos, Dakar, Amapa, Brazil, Atkinson Field (British Guiana), Port of Spain (Trinidad), and crossed the equator twice.

Conrad was accompanied by Richard Jennings, an observer for the record flight.

=== FAI certified world records ===
Conrad set nine official aviation world records (as recognized by the Fédération Aéronautique Internationale or FAI, the aviation world record adjudicating body).

Date	Aircraft	FAI Class	Record Event	Record
1 May 1952	PA-20-135 Pacer	C-1b	Distance	3,962.744 km (2,462.335 mi) Los Angeles CA - New York NY
4 June 1959	PA-24-250 Comanche	C-1d	Distance	12,341.26 km (7,668.50 mi) Casablanca - Trinidad - El Paso - Los Angeles
26 November 1959	PA-24-180 Comanche	C-1c	Distance	11,211.83 km (6,966.71 mi) Casablanca - El Paso TX
4 July 1960	PA-24-180 Comanche	C-1c	Distance over closed course	11,138.72 km (6,921.28 mi) Minneapolis MN - Chicago IL - Des Moines IA
8 March 1961	PA-23 Aztec	C-1	Speed around the world, westbound	198.27 km/h (123.20 mph)
8 March 1961	PA-23 Aztec	C-1d	Speed around the world, westbound	198.27 km/h (123.20 mph)
26 December 1964	PA-30 Twin Comanche	C-1e	Distance	12,678.83 km (7,878.26 mi) Cape Town - St Petersburg FL
4 February 1968	PA-23 Aztec	C-1d	Distance over closed course	6,357.48 km (3,950.35 mi) Chicago - Milwaukee
7 September 1968	PA-23 Aztec	C-1e	Distance over closed course	8,549.2 km (5,312.2 mi)

== Other flights ==
=== Vinson Massif controversy ===
In 1966, Conrad was involved in a controversial attempt to climb Vinson Massif. Vinson is the highest mountain in Antarctica, located about 1,200 km (750 mi) from the South Pole. That year, a team of climbers were sponsored to climb the mountain by the American Alpine Club and the National Geographic Society, and supported in the field by the U.S. Navy and the National Science Foundation Office of Antarctic Programs. At the same time, an unauthorized attempt was announced by Woodrow Wilson Sayre, who was planning to fly in a Piper Apache piloted by Conrad with four companions into the Sentinel Range to climb the Vinson Massif. Sayre had a reputation for problematic trips as a result of his unauthorized, unsuccessful, and nearly fatal attempt to climb Mount Everest from the north in 1962. His unauthorized incursion into Tibet led China to file an official protest with the U.S. State Department. However, the attempt did not materialize. Conrad had difficulties with his plane, and according to press reports at the time, he and Sayre were still in Buenos Aires on the day the first four members of authorized team reached Vinson's summit.

Conrad was good friends with Chuck and Betty Miller who ran a flying school in Santa Monica, and suggested that Betty undertake a solo flight across the Pacific Ocean, a feat not then completed by a woman. Along with William T. Piper, manufacturer of Piper aircraft, the group devised a plan for her to deliver a plane from California to Australia. Miller took off in Oakland on 25 April 1963 and completed the flight, landing in Brisbane, Australia on 13 May 1963.

== Awards ==
On August 8, 1965, Conrad was named that year's winner of the Harmon International Aviation Trophy, (although the New York Times indicates that Joan Smith also received the trophy for the flight, the official Harmon Trophy site does not list her). The Harmon trophies are described by the Clifford B. Harmon Trust as "American awards for the most outstanding international achievements in the arts and/or science of aeronautics for the preceding year, with the art of flying receiving first consideration."

== Family ==
Max and his wife Betty had ten children.
