= Piper Aviation Museum =

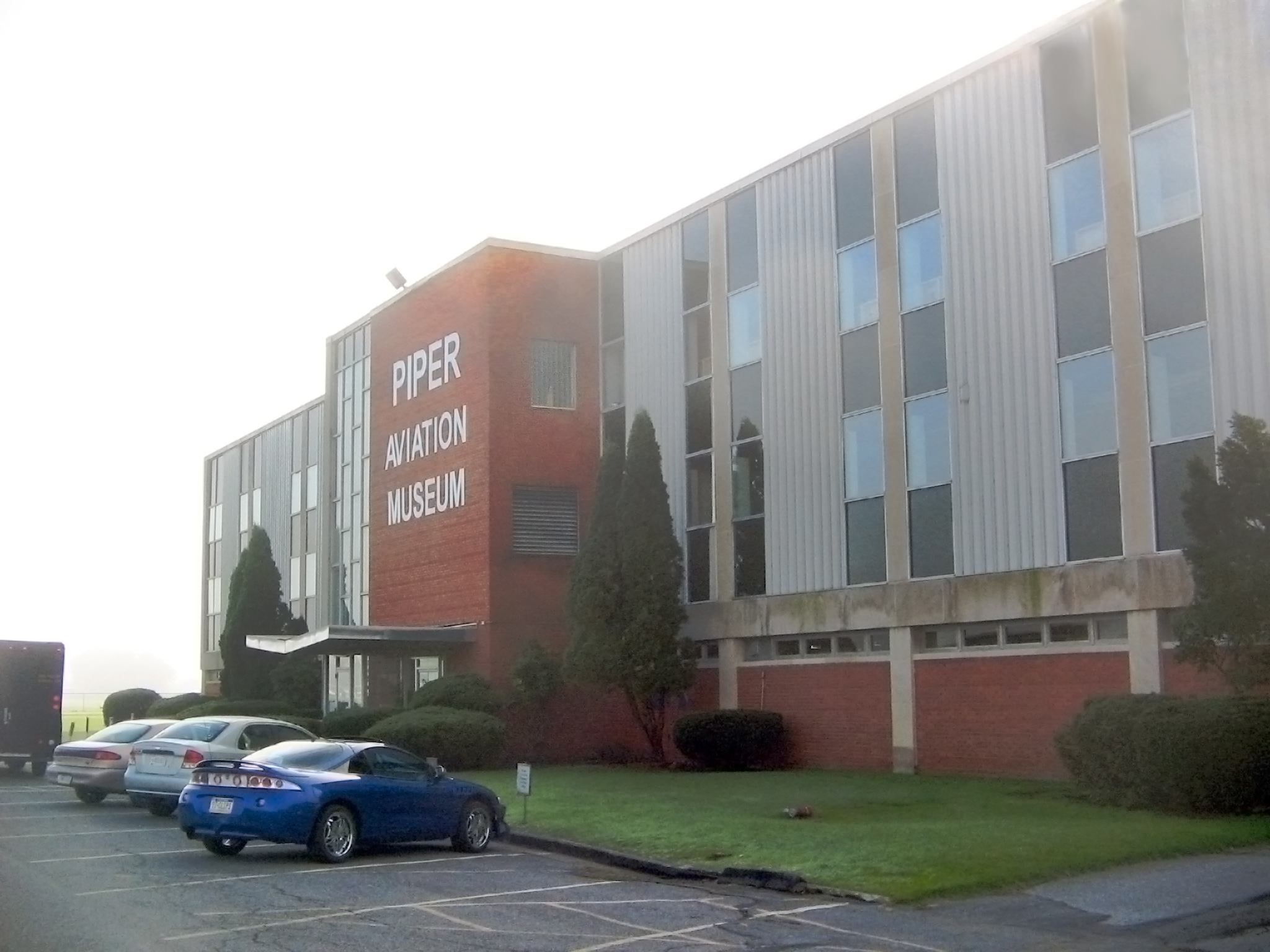
- The museum in October 2009

- Location within Pennsylvania
- Established: 1980s
- Location: Lock Haven, Pennsylvania, U.S.
- Coordinates: 41.134030°N 77.426916°W
- Type: Aviation museum
- Founders: Calvin Arter; Bob Edmonson; Genny Edmonson; William Piper, Jr.
- President: Ron Dremel
- Curator: Dr. Ira Masemore
- Website: pipermuseum.com

The Piper Aviation Museum is an aviation museum at the William T. Piper Memorial Airport in Lock Haven, Pennsylvania. It is focused on the history of the Piper Aircraft Corporation.

== History ==
Efforts to establish a museum dedicated to Piper aircraft began in 1984, following the company's decision to close the Lock Haven factory in March. Later that year, at a dinner with Piper distributors, Cal Arter, a company test pilot, announced plans to acquire a tractor trailer to create a mobile display. A 42-foot (13 m) trailer was donated by the Pennsylvania Historical and Museum Commission in 1986 and for ten years it existed as a branch of the Lock Haven Heisey Museum. Then, in late 1996, the museum purchased the former Piper Aircraft engineering building.

One of the two first light aircraft to circumnavigate the globe, a PA-12 named The City of Angels, was donated in mid-2006 by the museum's historian, Harry P. Mutter.

The museum opened additional exhibit space in 2022. The museum acquired a J3C and PA-23 in 2024 and the sole PA-47 in 2025. It announced plans for a 9,600-square-foot (890 m^{2}) expansion in 2026.

== Exhibits ==
Exhibits at the museum include a display about the former Piper head of styling, Dick Clark and a flight simulator made from a PA-38. A historical marker is also located in front of the museum.

== Aircraft on display ==
- Piper J2 Cub
- Piper J3C-65 Cub
- Piper J3C-65 Cub
- Piper J3C-65 Cub
- Piper J3C-65 Cub
- Piper J4A Cub Coupe
- Piper PA-8 Skycycle – replica
- Piper PA-12 Super Cruiser
- Piper PA-15 Vagabond
- Piper PA-16 Clipper
- Piper PA-22-108 Colt
- Piper PA-22-135 Tri-Pacer
- Piper PA-22-150 Tri-Pacer
- Piper PA-22-160 Tri-Pacer
- Piper PA-23-235 Apache
- Piper PA-23-250 Aztec
- Piper PA-24 Comanche
- Piper PA-25 Pawnee
- Piper PA-29 Papoose
- Piper PA-30 Twin Comanche
- Piper PA-31P-350 Mojave – In storage
- Piper PA-31T Cheyenne – In storage
- Piper PA-38 Tomahawk
- Piper PA-41P Aztec
- Piper PA-47 PiperJet
- Piper PT-1
