= William T. Piper Memorial Airport =

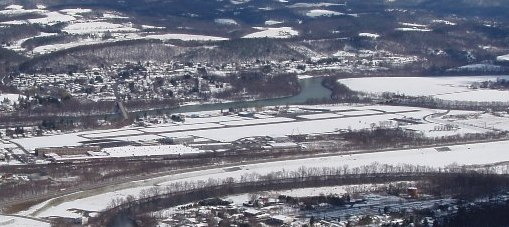
- IATA: LHV; ICAO: KLHV; FAA LID: LHV

Summary
- Airport type: Public
- Owner: City of Lock Haven
- Operator: Lock Haven Airport Authority
- Serves: Lock Haven, Pennsylvania
- Elevation AMSL: 556 ft (169 m)
- Coordinates: 41°08′09″N 077°25′20″W
- Website: http://www.piperairport.com/default.htm

Map
- Location of airport in Pennsylvania LHV (the United States)

Runways
Direction	Length		Surface
Direction	ft	m	Surface
9L/27R	3,799	1,158	Asphalt
9R/27L	2,179	664	Turf

Statistics (2011)
- Aircraft operations: 30,400
- Based aircraft: 60
- Source: Federal Aviation Administration

William T. Piper Memorial Airport (IATA: LHV, ICAO: KLHV, FAA LID: LHV) is a city-owned public airport two miles east of Lock Haven, in Clinton County, Pennsylvania. The National Plan of Integrated Airport Systems for 2011–2015 categorized it as a general aviation facility.

Named for William T. Piper, the airport is at the foot of the Bald Eagle Mountain ridge, between the West Branch Susquehanna River and Bald Eagle Creek. It covers 112 acres (45 ha), has two runways and is operated by the City of Lock Haven.

== History ==
The former Piper "blue building" at the airport was listed for sale in 2015.

The city considered selling the airport in 2023. By the end of the year, the city had not purchased aviation gasoline for the airport.

== Facilities ==
The airport covers 112 acres (45 ha) at an elevation of 556 feet (169 m). It has two parallel runways: 9L/27R is 3,799 by 75 feet (1,158 x 23 m) asphalt; 9R/27L is 2,179 by 100 feet (664 x 30 m) turf.

In the year ending October 13, 2011 the airport had 30,400 aircraft operations, average 83 per day: 99% general aviation, <1% air taxi, and <1% military. 60 aircraft were then based at the airport: 85% single-engine, 8% multi-engine, 2% jet, 3% glider, and 2% ultralight.

The airport was home to AvSport of Lock Haven, a flight school specializing in Sport Pilot training in Light Sport Aircraft. The owner closed operations in June 2024 to move to California.

The Piper Aviation Museum is located at the southwest end of the airport, preserving the history and legacy of the Piper Aircraft Corporation which manufactured aircraft from that location prior to relocating to Vero Beach, Florida.

== Annual fly-in ==
Every summer the airport holds a Piper fly-in. Hundreds of Piper aircraft and pilots attend, pilots share stories and the public is welcomed to attend. Piper Cubs are the aircraft of choice at this fly-in. Many people also visit the Piper Museum on the airport grounds.

== Incidents and accidents ==
On June 20, 2010, a Cessna 210 chartered by a federal agency crashed into a neighborhood directly off the west end of runway 9L/27R. The crash site was less than a block from the airfield, all three people on board died. The aircraft was making an approach to the airport and had notified Air traffic control of low fuel but did not issue an emergency. When the plane crashed it struck a telephone pole, a porch and three cars before coming to a rest in the middle of a street. One person on the ground had some minor injured when he was sitting in his SUV when it was struck by the wing of the plane. Eye witness accounts say the sound of the crash sounded like "A horrible metal crunching sound" and "Thought it was a car crash at first then I saw the plane". The Federal Aviation Administration later stated that the aircraft left William T Piper airport and experienced Engine failure and low fuel readings so it then turned around to try and land. The FAA then released a report stating that the fuel tank had a leak and was losing "exponential amounts of fuel during a short period of time" and other occurrences contributed to the crash of the aircraft.

On June 20, 2014, a vintage single engine Taylor J-2 attending the fly-in crashed shortly after takeoff from the airport, the pilot and one passenger walked away with no injuries after landing in a tree in a backyard. Witnesses at the fly-in reported seeing the aircraft stall several times, barely making it over the fence that surrounds the airport before crashing. Federal Aviation Administration records show the plane was manufactured in 1936.

== See also ==
- List of airports in Pennsylvania
- Williamsport Regional Airport
