= Taylor Bird =

General information
- Type: Homebuilt aircraft
- National origin: United States
- Designer: C. G. Taylor

The Taylor Bird is a homebuilt aircraft that was designed by C. G. Taylor, the designer of the Taylor Cub.

== Design and development ==
The part-built Taylor Bird was presented at the 1977 EAA airshow. The aircraft is a tandem seat, mid-wing pusher configuration design, with conventional landing gear. The fuselage is built with aluminum stressed skin. The aircraft features a unique entryway, mounting the entire nose and windshield on sliding rails that moves forward, allowing access to the cabin. The wingtips are slotted and wings are foldable. The engine features a custom propeller speed reduction unit that remained in limited production after Taylor production ceased. The prototype first flew on July 17, 1979.

== Specifications (Taylor Bird) ==
Data from Jane's All the World's Aircraft 1980–81

General characteristics

- Crew: one
- Capacity: one passenger
- Length: 18 ft 0 in (5.49 m)
- Wingspan: 26 ft 0 in (7.92 m)
- Height: 5 ft 6 in (1.68 m)
- Airfoil: NACA 23015
- Empty weight: 560 lb (254 kg)
- Max takeoff weight: 1,000 lb (454 kg)
- Powerplant: 1 × Subaru with 2:1 gear reduction 1400cc water-cooled horizontally opposed piston automotive conversion, 65 hp (48 kW)

Performance

- Maximum speed: 109 kn (125 mph, 202 km/h)
- Cruise speed: 100 kn (120 mph, 190 km/h)
- Endurance: 4 hr

== See also ==
Aircraft of comparable role, configuration, and era

- 3I Sky Arrow
