= PA29 =

PA29 may refer to:

- Pennsylvania Route 29
- Pennsylvania's 29th congressional district
- Piper PA-29 Papoose
