= PA31 =

PA31 or PA-31 may refer to:

- Pennsylvania's 31st congressional district
- Pennsylvania Route 31
- Piper PA-31 Navajo piston-engine light aircraft
- Piper PA-31T Cheyenne turboprop-engine light aircraft
