= Piper PA-42 Cheyenne =

Twin engine turboprop aircraft produced 1979-1993

PA-42 Cheyenne
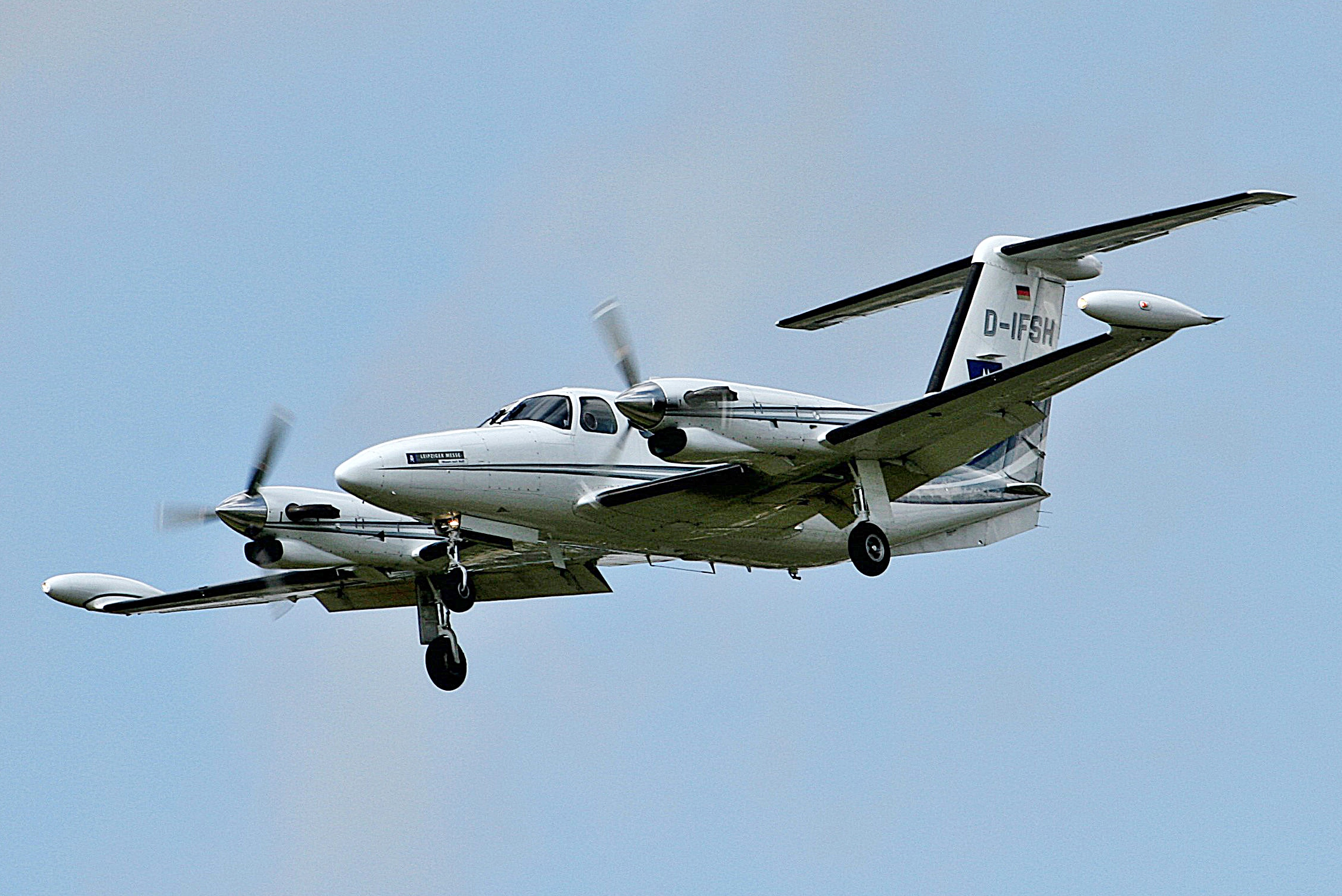
- PA-42-720 Cheyenne IIIA

General information
- Type: Turboprop
- Manufacturer: Piper Aircraft
- Number built: 192; 149 IIIAs and 43 400s

History
- Manufactured: 1979-1993
- First flight: May 18, 1979
- Developed from: Piper PA-31T Cheyenne

The Piper PA-42 Cheyenne is a twin engine turboprop aircraft built by Piper Aircraft. The PA-42 Cheyenne is a larger development of the earlier PA-31T Cheyennes I and II (which are, in turn, turboprop developments of the PA-31 Navajo).

== History ==
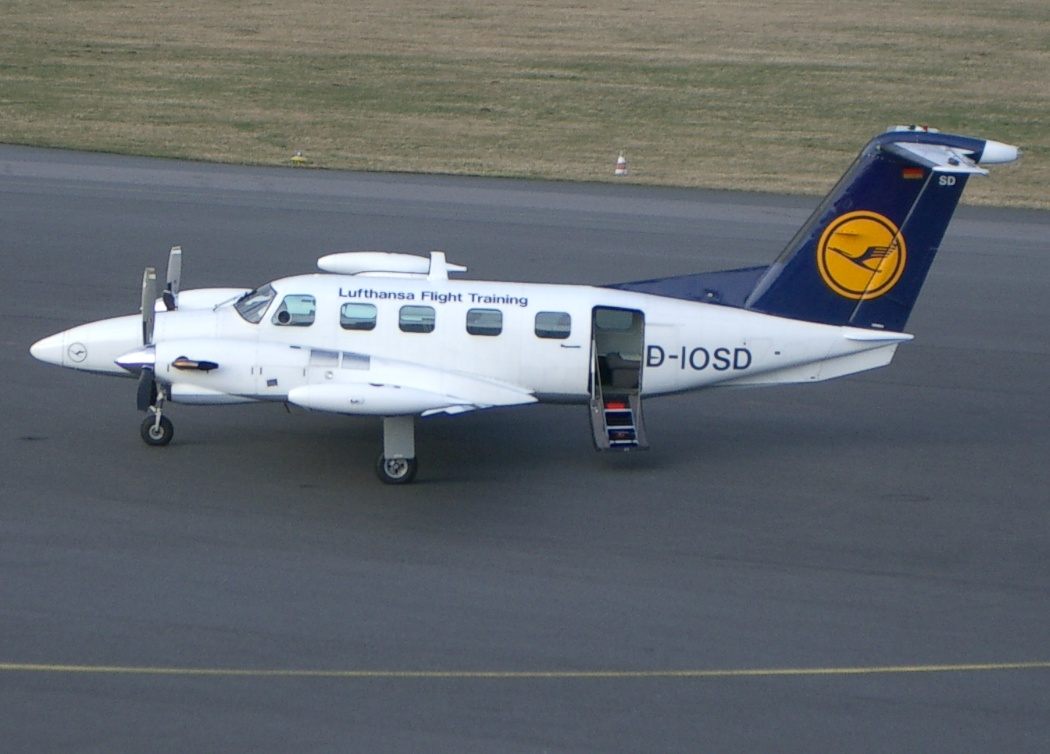
Lufthansa Cheyenne III with a T-tail

=== Cheyenne III ===
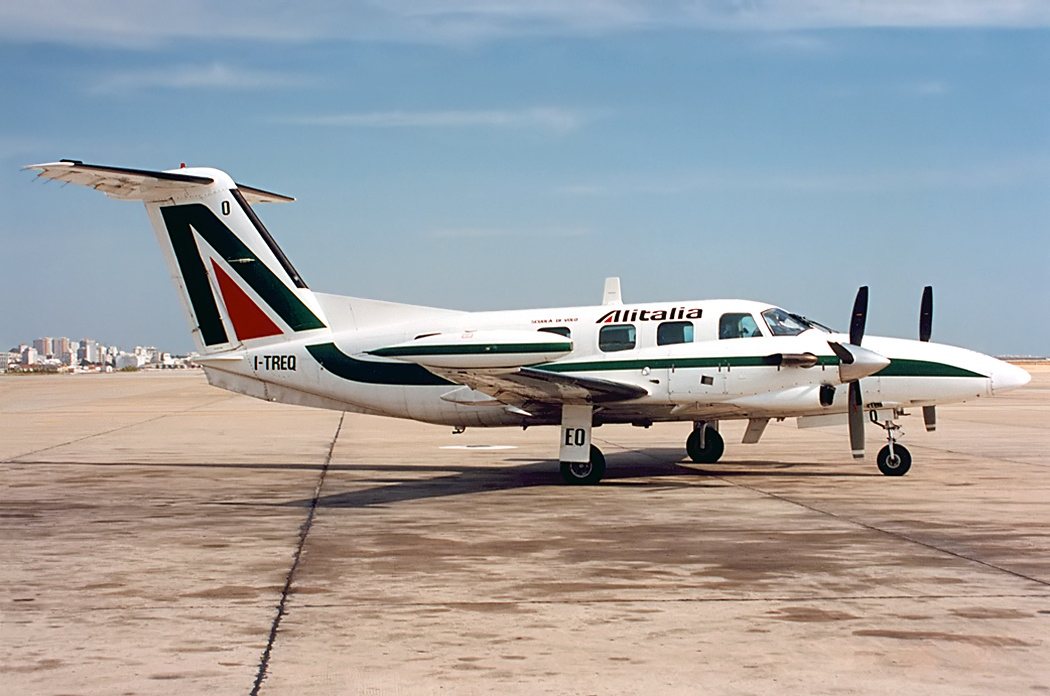
Alitalia Cheyenne IIIA with PT6 side exhausts

The PA-42 Cheyenne III was announced in September 1977. The first production Cheyenne III flew for the first time on May 18, 1979, and FAA certification was granted in early 1980. Compared with the Cheyenne II, the PA-42-720 was about 1 m (3 ft) longer, was powered by 537 kW (720-shp) PT6A-41 turboprops and introduced a T-tail, the most obvious external difference between the PA-31T and PA-42, as well as the most significant change to the series. Deliveries of production Cheyenne IIIs began on June 30, 1980.

=== Cheyenne 400 ===
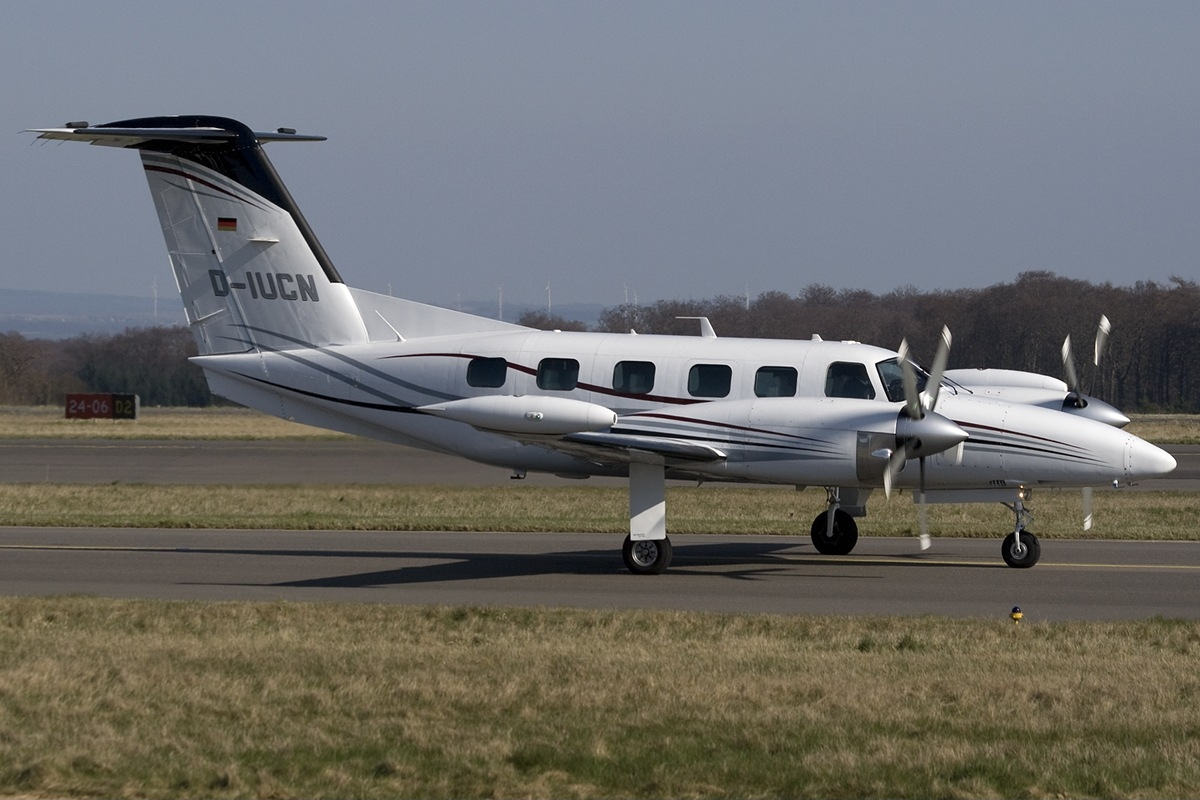
Cheyenne 400 with TPE331 rear exhaust

In the late 1970s, Piper avoided developing a clean-sheet light business jet to compete with the Cessna Citation I and upgraded its PT6As from 720 to 1,000 hp (540 to 750 kW) Honeywell TPE331-14s. The PA-42-1000 Cheyenne IV was certified in 1984, 43 were built until 1991 and 37 remain in service in 2018.

Due to its top speed over 351 kn (404 mph; 650 km/h) it was renamed the Cheyenne 400LS when Lear Siegler owned Piper, then the Cheyenne 400.

Flat rated to ISA+37, the turboprops maintains its power to almost 20,000 ft (6,100 m). The 106 in (2.7 m) Dowty Rotol propellers have four round-tip composite blades and 8 in (20 cm) of ground clearance. Its empennage was enlarged for stability at higher speeds and altitudes, and its fuselage was strengthened. Pressurization was increased to 7.6 psi (520 hPa) to elevate its ceiling from 35,000 to 41,000 ft (10,700 to 12,500 m) while maintaining a 10,000 ft (3,000 m) cabin.

The aircraft's top speed is 351 kn (650 km/h; 404 mph), faster than the Citation I on most trips while burning one-third less fuel. It can fly 1,842 nmi (3,411 km) at the same speed; it can carry eight passengers farther than a King Air 200 while cruising 50 kn (93 km/h) faster. It can operate out of 3,000 ft (900 m) runways with a 97 kn (180 km/h) minimum control speed, similar to a King Air 300; it can operate from much shorter hot and high runways than a Citation I and landing distance is shortened by the rotating speedbrake effect of the propellers in beta pitch. It can climb directly to FL 410 at its 12,050 lb (5,470 kg) MTOW and typical single-pilot BOWs are 7,850–7,900 lb (3,560–3,580 kg). It can hold 3,819 lb (1,732 kg) of fuel plus two passengers with baggage, while each extra passenger costs 100 nmi (190 km) of range. It has a 98% dispatch reliability and a cabin that is quieter than a King Air.

The 400LS made aviation history on 16 April 1985 by setting two new time-to-climb records for its class (C-1e Group 2, 3000m and 9,000m) and shattering two time-to-climb records for all turboprop classes (6,000m and 12,000m): with retired United States Air Force Brigadier General Chuck Yeager at the helm of N400PS (with co-pilot Renald "Dav" Davenport flying right-seat), the aircraft departed from Portland-Hillsboro Airport's Runway 31L, immediately reached a 5,959-foot-per-minute climbout and achieved its 3,000m record in 1 minute, 47.6 seconds; the 6,000m record in 3 minutes, 42.0 seconds; its 9,000m record at 6 minutes, 34.6 seconds; the 12,000m record at 11 minutes, 8.3 seconds (time-to-altitude records were captured by on-board video camera aimed at relevant panel gauges, timed with superimposed timer; also verified by Hillsboro Airport tower personnel via radar, using encoded altimeter data transmitted from aircraft to tower via transponder). Other records later set by the 400LS, again piloted by Yeager in 400LS N4118Y (later reregistered as N46HL) for the C-1e Group 2 class, were: Miami-to-Boston, Miami-to-New York City, San Francisco-to-Charleston, West Virginia, San Francisco-to-Cincinnati, San Francisco-to-Los Angeles, New York City-to-Paris, Washington, DC-to-Paris and Gander-Paris.

The 400LS has 100-hour inspection intervals, engine midlife inspections are due at 1,500 hours and overhauls come at 3,000 hours. The fuselage is limited to a 15,000-hour life, while the wing and empennage have 20,000-hour life limits.

== Variants ==
- Cheyenne III, model PA-42, equipped with Pratt & Whitney Canada PT6-41 engines
- Cheyenne IIIA, model PA-42-720, equipped with PT6A-61 engines.
- Cheyenne IV, model PA-42-1000, later the Cheyenne 400LS, and then Cheyenne 400. This is the largest aircraft ever made by Piper, with 43 built. Powered by 1,000 shp (750 kW) Garrett TPE-331 engines, and four-blade props.
- Customs High Endurance Tracker (CHET), special surveillance version of the Cheyenne III, fitted with an AN/APG-66 radar and a ventral FLIR; nine built for the U.S. Customs Service.

== Specifications ==
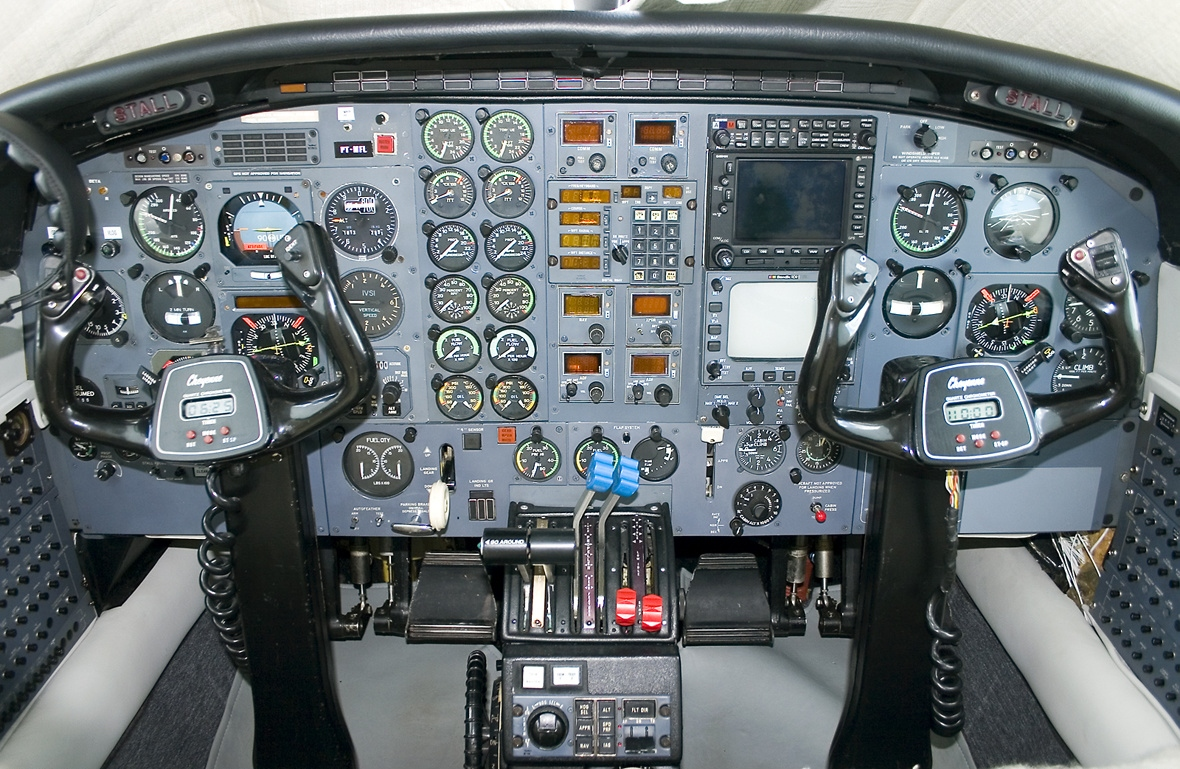
flight deck

Corporate aircraft directory
Variant	III (PA-42)	IIIA (PA-42-720)	400 (PA-42-1000)
Crew	1–2		
Passengers	6–9		
Length	43ft 5in / 13.2m		
Span	47ft 8in / 14.5m		
Height	14ft 9in / 4.5m		17ft 0in / 5.18m
Wing area	293sq ft / 27.2 m^{2}		
Cabin W × H	4ft 3in by 4ft 8in / 1.30m by 1.42m		
MTOW	11,080lb / 5,026kg	11,200 lb (5,080 kg)	12,050 lb (5,466 kg)
OEW	6,389lb / 2,898kg	6,837 lb (3,101 kg)	7,565 lb (3,431 kg)
Fuel Capacity	562 US gal (2,130 L); 3,752 lb (1,702 kg)		582 US gal (2,200 L); 3,819 lb (1,732 kg)
2× Turboprops	P&WC PT6A-41	P&WC PT6A-61	Garrett TPE331-14
Unit power	720 hp (537 kW)		1,000 hp (746 kW)
Cruise	290 kn (537 km/h)	LR 282–305 kn (522–565 km/h) Max	LR 298–351 kn (552–650 km/h) Max
Range	1,330 nmi / 2,463 km	2,270 nmi (4,204 km)	2,240 nmi (4,148 km)
BFL	3,920 ft (1,195 m)	3,363 ft (1,025 m)	3,180 ft (969 m)
Ceiling	33,000 ft (10,100 m)	35,000 ft (10,700 m)	41,470 ft (12,600 m)
Climb rate	2,380 ft/min / 12.1 m/s	2,235 ft/min (11.35 m/s)	3,242 ft/min (16.47 m/s)
Wing loading	37.8 lb/sq ft (185 kg/m^{2})	38.2 lb/sq ft (187 kg/m^{2})	41.1 lb/sq ft (201 kg/m^{2})
power/mass	0.13 hp/lb (0.21 kW/kg)	0.13 hp/lb (0.21 kW/kg)	0.17 hp/lb (0.28 kW/kg)

== Operators ==
The aircraft is operated by private individuals, companies and executive charter operators. A number of companies also use the aircraft as part of fractional ownership programs.

== See also ==
Related development

- Piper PA-31 Navajo
- Piper PA-31T Cheyenne

Aircraft of comparable role, configuration, and era

- Beech Super King Air
- Cessna 441 Conquest II
- Embraer EMB 121 Xingu
- Mitsubishi MU-2
- Piaggio P.180 Avanti
