= Betty Miller (pilot) =

American pilot

- Born: Betty Jean Verret; April 6, 1926
- Died: February 21, 2018 (aged 91)
- Occupations: Aviator; helicopter pilot

Betty Jean Verret Miller (April 6, 1926 – February 21, 2018) was the first female pilot to fly solo across the Pacific Ocean, which she did in May 1963.

== Early life ==
Betty Jean Verret was born in Venice, California on 6 April 1926 to Earday Verret and Bertha DeLay Verret during one of the worst flooding rainstorms seen in the city. She had two sisters, Merle and Phyllis.

She attended Venice High School, and was drawn to a course called "Radio Shop", having grown up under the traffic pattern of the Santa Monica airport.

== Career ==
After graduating, Betty joined the Civil Aeronautics Administration (now the FAA) as an Aircraft Communicator, and worked at several airports in the western United States. She met and married Chuck Miller during this time. The Millers eventually settled in Santa Monica, California, where they owned and operated The Santa Monica Flyers, a flight school.

She had been flying since 1952 and had become the 38th woman ever rated as a helicopter pilot. She was also an instructor, dispatcher, bookkeeper and maintenance scheduler at Santa Monica Flyers flight and ground school as well as an office manager.

In 1961, she became the first woman to solo fly a Hughes Model 269A helicopter, and also helped set physical standards for female astronauts that are still used today by those participating in physical tests at the Lovelace Clinic in Albuquerque, New Mexico.

The Santa Monica Flyers flying school became the base for planning Betty Miller's historic Pacific flight. With their friend Max Conrad a test pilot, they got involved in aircraft delivery. Working with William T. Piper, the manufacturer of Piper aircraft, the group devised a plan for Betty to deliver a plane from California to Australia. No woman had yet accomplished a solo flight across the Pacific. Max Conrad suggested she make the flight over the Pacific and helped design the extra gas tanks for the plane.

After significant planning and several weather delays, in April 1963, she flew from Oakland, California, USA to Brisbane, Queensland, Australia, to deliver the plane (a twin-engine Piper) to a buyer. The flight also made her the first woman to fly solo from Oakland, California to Honolulu, Hawaii which she did in just over 17 hours.

She started the first leg of the epic flight on April 25, 1963 (with her troll doll, Dammit, as a lucky mascot) from Oakland, California and took over 17 hours to reach Honolulu. On May 5, she left Honolulu for the second leg of her flight to Canton Island, next to Fiji, and New Caledonia. She landed in Brisbane, Australia, on May 13, 1963. Miller climbed out of the plane wearing a cotton dress and high heels to the cheers of a large crowd. The total elapsed flying time for the flight over the Pacific was 51 hours, 38 minutes.

== Awards ==
In recognition of her flight, she received the Federal Aviation Administration’s Gold Medal for Exceptional Service from President Kennedy, and later President Johnson presented her with the Harmon International Trophy for Aviatrix of the Year (1963).

== Personal life ==
Betty Jean Verret met and married her husband, Charles Miller, known as Chuck, when she was stationed in Wendover working for the Civil Aeronautics Administration. They met when Chuck radioed her at Wendover airport to report a wildfire caused by a meteorite which he had seen as he was flying over the desert. They went out to find the meteorite and kept a piece of the rock as a memento of their first date.

Betty Miller was a member of the Ninety-Nines and the Whirly Girls clubs, which bring together female pilots.

In retirement Betty Miller became an artist. After Chuck died, she moved to Ocala, Florida, and then moved to Bountiful, Utah in 2012 with her yellow naped Amazon parrot, Paco.

Betty Miller died on February 21, 2018, at the age of 91.
