= Piper PA-29 Papoose =

PA-29 Papoose

General information
- Type: Single-engined training monoplane
- National origin: United States
- Manufacturer: Piper
- Status: Cancelled
- Number built: 1

History
- First flight: 1962

The Piper PA-29 Papoose was an American single-engined training monoplane designed by Piper, only one was built and the type did not enter production.

== Development ==
In the late 1950s Piper began designing a two-seated (side-by-side) low-wing monoplane trainer built of fiberglass reinforced plastic construction. Originally intended to be powered by a 100 hp (75 kW) Continental O-200 piston engine, the prototype instead used a 108 hp (81 kW) Lycoming O-235-CIB piston engine. The prototype, registered N2900M first flew in 1962 but the type did not enter production. The Papoose prototype was on "permanent loan" to the EAA Museum at Oshkosh from 7/17/1973 until 6/25/1987 when it was returned to Lock Haven. It currently resides in the Piper Aviation Museum in Lock Haven.

== Specifications ==
Data from

General characteristics

- Crew: one
- Capacity: one passenger
- Length: 20 ft 8 in (6.30 m)
- Wingspan: 25 ft 0 in (7.62 m)
- Height: 7 ft 1 in (2.16 m)
- Wing area: 110 sq ft (10 m^{2})
- Empty weight: 803 1/2 lb (364 kg)
- Gross weight: 1,500 lb (680 kg)
- Powerplant: 1 × Lycoming O-235-CIB air-cooled four-cylinder horizontally-opposed piston engine, 108 hp (81 kW)

Performance

- Maximum speed: 130 mph (210 km/h, 110 kn)
