= Golden Age Air Museum =

- Location within Pennsylvania
- Established: 1996
- Location: Bethel Township, Berks County, Pennsylvania
- Coordinates: 40.487°N 76.268°W
- Type: Aviation museum
- Founders: Paul Dougherty Jr.; Paul Dougherty Sr.; James A. McCord
- Website: www.goldenageair.org

The Golden Age Air Museum is an aviation museum located at Grimes Airport in Bethel Township, Berks County, Pennsylvania. It is focused on the Golden Age of Aviation.

== History ==
Paul Dougherty Sr. and Paul Dougherty Jr. began restoring aircraft at Warrington Airport in Warrington, Pennsylvania, in 1985. However, when the airport closed, they were forced to find a new location for their collection. After a search, they purchased Grimes Airport in 1996 and founded the museum along with James A. McCord. It opened the following summer with nine airplanes. By 2013, the collection had expanded to almost three dozen airplanes. The museum completed its reproduction SPAD XIII in 2023.

== Exhibits ==
Exhibits at the museum include a Link Trainer.

== Collection ==
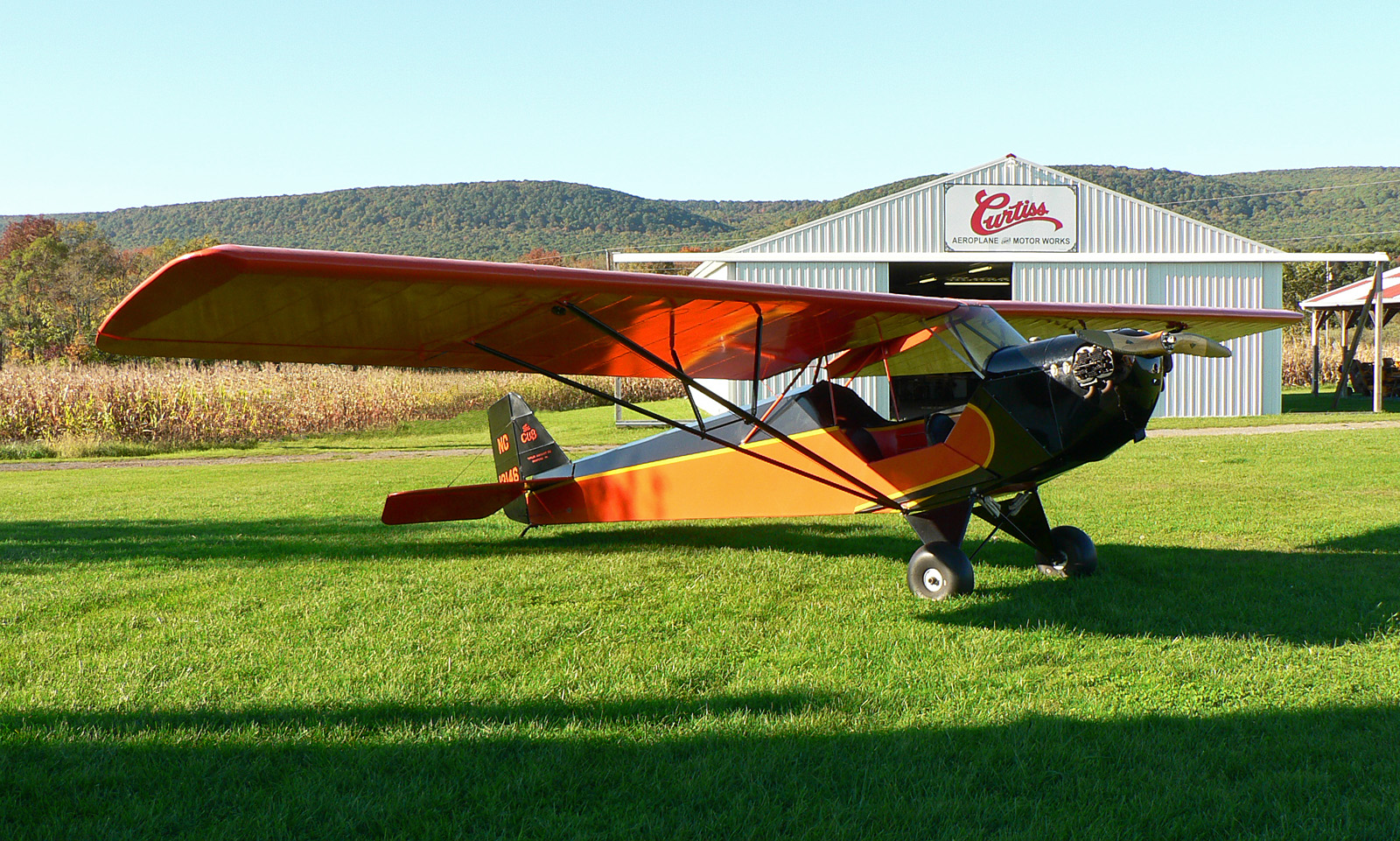
Taylor E-2 Cub

- Aeronca C-3
- Allison Sport
- Brunner-Winkle Bird CK
- Cessna 195
- Cessna AW
- Christen Eagle
- Culver Cadet
- Curtiss Fledgling
- Curtiss JN-4D
- Dormoy Bathtub – replica
- Fairchild 24R
- Fleet 7
- Fokker Dr.I – replica
- Franklin Sport A
- Great Lakes Sport Trainer – replica
- Great Lakes Trainer
- Heath Parasol
- Monocoupe 70
- Pietenpol Air Camper
- RLU-1 Breezy
- Rumpler C.V – replica
- Sopwith Pup – replica
- SPAD XIII – replica
- Sperry Messenger – replica
- Stampe-Vertongen SV.4
- Star Cavalier B
- Star Cavalier E
- Swallow TP
- Taylor E-2 Cub
- Taylorcraft BC-12D
- Taylor-Young Model A
- Travel Air 2000
- Waco GXE
- White WW-1 Der Jäger D.IX
- Winstead Special

== Events ==
The museum holds an airshow called the Golden Age Flying Circus twice a year.

== See also ==
- Air Power Museum
- Eagles Mere Air Museum
- Old Rhinebeck Aerodrome
- Port Townsend Aero Museum
- Western Antique Aeroplane and Automobile Museum
