= Grimes Airport =

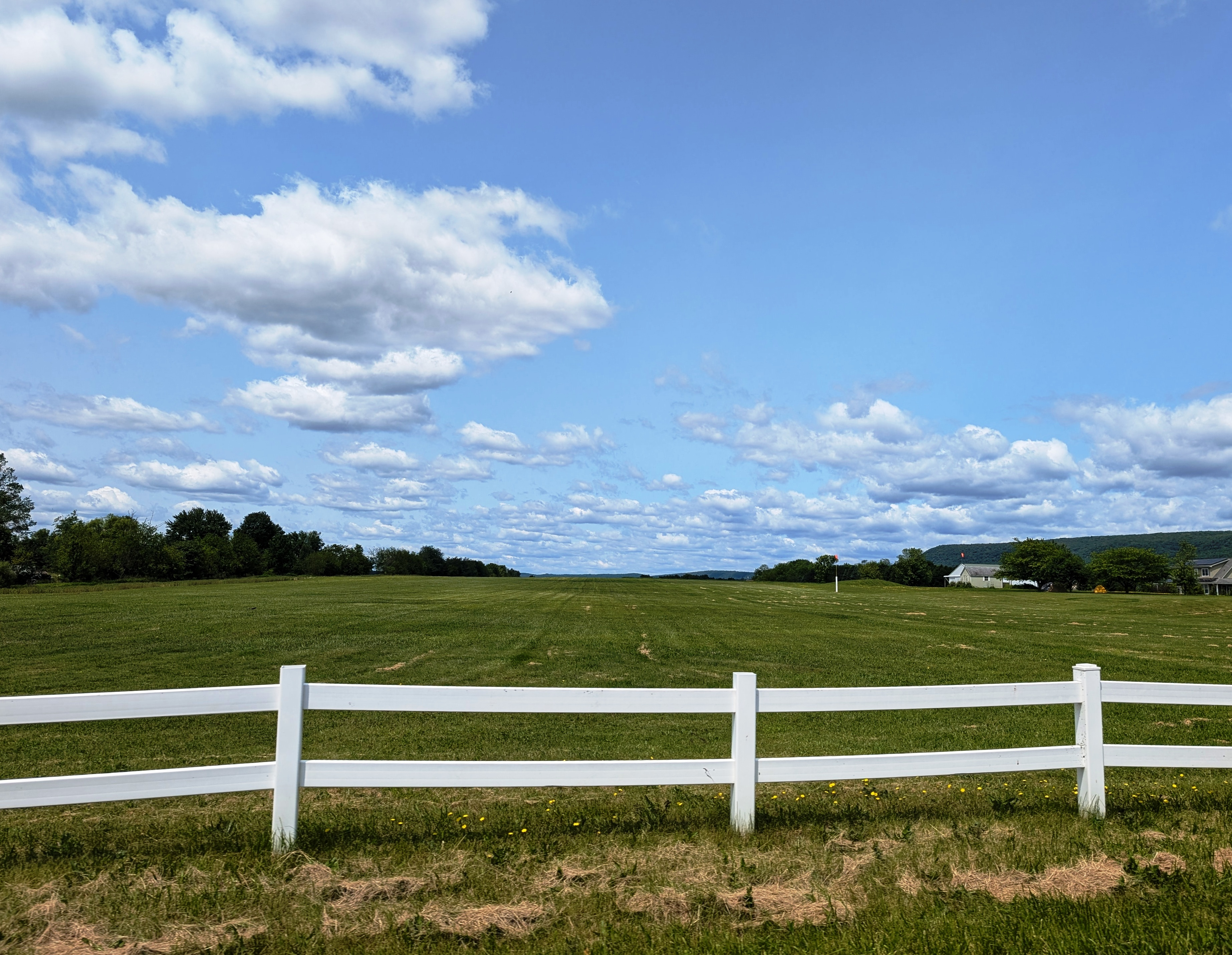
- IATA: none; ICAO: none; FAA LID: 8N1

Summary
- Airport type: Public
- Owner: Paul D. Dougherty, Jr.
- Serves: Bethel, Pennsylvania
- Elevation AMSL: 582 ft (177 m)
- Coordinates: 40°29′05″N 076°15′49″W

Map
- Location of airport in Pennsylvania 8N1 (the United States)

Runways
Direction	Length		Surface
Direction	ft	m	Surface
11/29	2,720	829	Turf

Statistics (2009)
- Aircraft operations: 650
- Based aircraft: 17
- Source: Federal Aviation Administration

Grimes Airport (FAA LID: 8N1) is a privately owned public-use airport located two nautical miles (3.7 km) east of the central business district of Bethel, in Berks County, Pennsylvania, United States.

The Golden Age Air Museum is located at Grimes Airport. This organization focuses on pre-WWII aircraft.

== Facilities and aircraft ==
Grimes Airport covers an area of 50 acres (20 ha) at an elevation of 582 feet (177 m) above mean sea level. It has one runway designated 11/29 with a turf surface measuring 2,720 by 100 feet (829 x 30 m).

For the 12-month period ending May 14, 2009, the airport had 650 aircraft operations, an average of 54 per month: 92% general aviation and 8% military. At that time there were 17 aircraft based at this airport: 100% single-engine.

== See also ==
- List of airports in Pennsylvania
