= Taylor Chummy =

Chummy
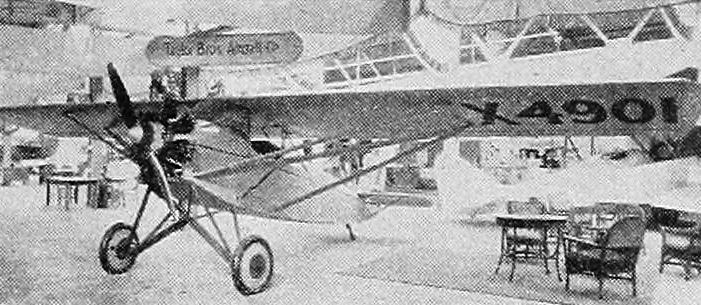
- Taylor A-2 Chummy in 1928

General information
- Type: light utility
- Manufacturer: Taylor Brothers Aircraft Company
- Designer: C. Gilbert Taylor and Gordon Taylor
- Number built: 8

History
- Manufactured: 1927–1930
- First flight: February 14, 1928
- Developed into: Taylor Cub

The Taylor Chummy was a light utility aircraft made by the Taylor Aircraft Company in the late 1920s. It was the fore-runner of the highly successful Piper Cub series.

== Design and development ==
The Chummy was designed by brothers Clarence Gilbert Taylor and Gordon Taylor in 1928. It is a braced, parasol-wing monoplane with two seats side-by-side in an open cockpit. Power was supplied by a tractor-mounted radial engine. Fixed, tailskid undercarriage was fitted, initially with a through-axle, but later with divided main units. The name "Chummy" was chosen because of the side-by-side seating.

== Operational history ==
The first B-2 prototype was rebuilt with a seven-degree variable-incidence wing for entry into the Guggenheim Safe Airplane Competition under the designation C-2.

The Chummy was expensive and did not sell well, leading to the bankruptcy of the Taylor Brothers company in 1930 after only eight aircraft were built.

== Variants ==
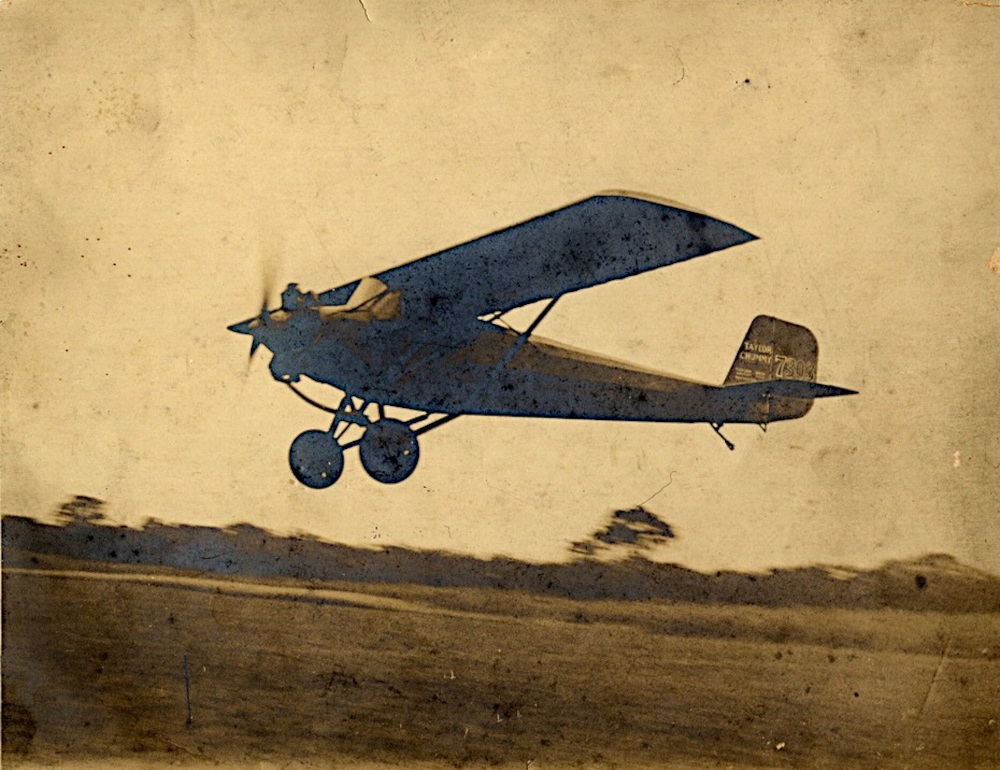
First B-2 Chummy prototype

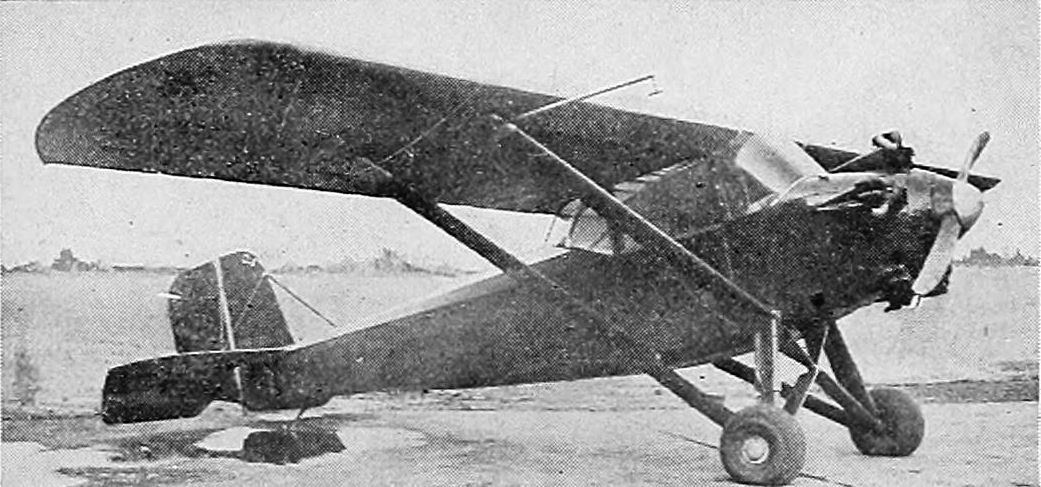
The same aircraft after conversion to C-2 standard

A-2 Chummy
Two prototypes through-axle main undercarriage. The first, construction number (c/n) 3, was designated Arrowing A-2 Chummy and was powered by a 90 hp (67 kW) Anzani radial engine. The second, c/n 4, was designated Taylor A-2 Chummy and was powered by a 96 hp (72 kW) Ryan-Siemens engine.
B-2 Chummy
Refined version based on the A-2 with divided main undercarriage. Originally offered with a 90 hp (67 kW) Kinner K-5 or 96 hp (72 kW) Ryan-Siemens Yankee 7 engine, though the latter option was later replaced with a 90 hp (67 kW) Brownbach Tiger engine following the completion of the first production aircraft. Two built; two prototypes (c/n 7 and 8) and four production aircraft (c/n 9, 12, 13, and 14), all powered by Kinner engines. Several aircraft had their construction numbers changed after completion; the unflown second prototype (c/n 8) became c/n 10 while the third production aircraft (c/n 13) became c/n 15.
C-2 Chummy
The first prototype B-2 (c/n 7) rebuilt with a variable-incidence wing and assigned a new construction number, c/n 10.

== Accidents and incidents ==
On April 24, 1928, Gordon Taylor crashed A-2 Chummy prototype c/n 4, registered X4901, at an exhibition at Ford Airport in Dearborn, Michigan. His passenger, Aaron Rosenbleet, was killed instantly, and Taylor died of his injuries shortly after reaching hospital. Clarence Taylor witnessed the crash.

== Replica ==
A Taylor Chummy replica is on display at Greater Rochester International Airport.

== Specifications (B-2) ==
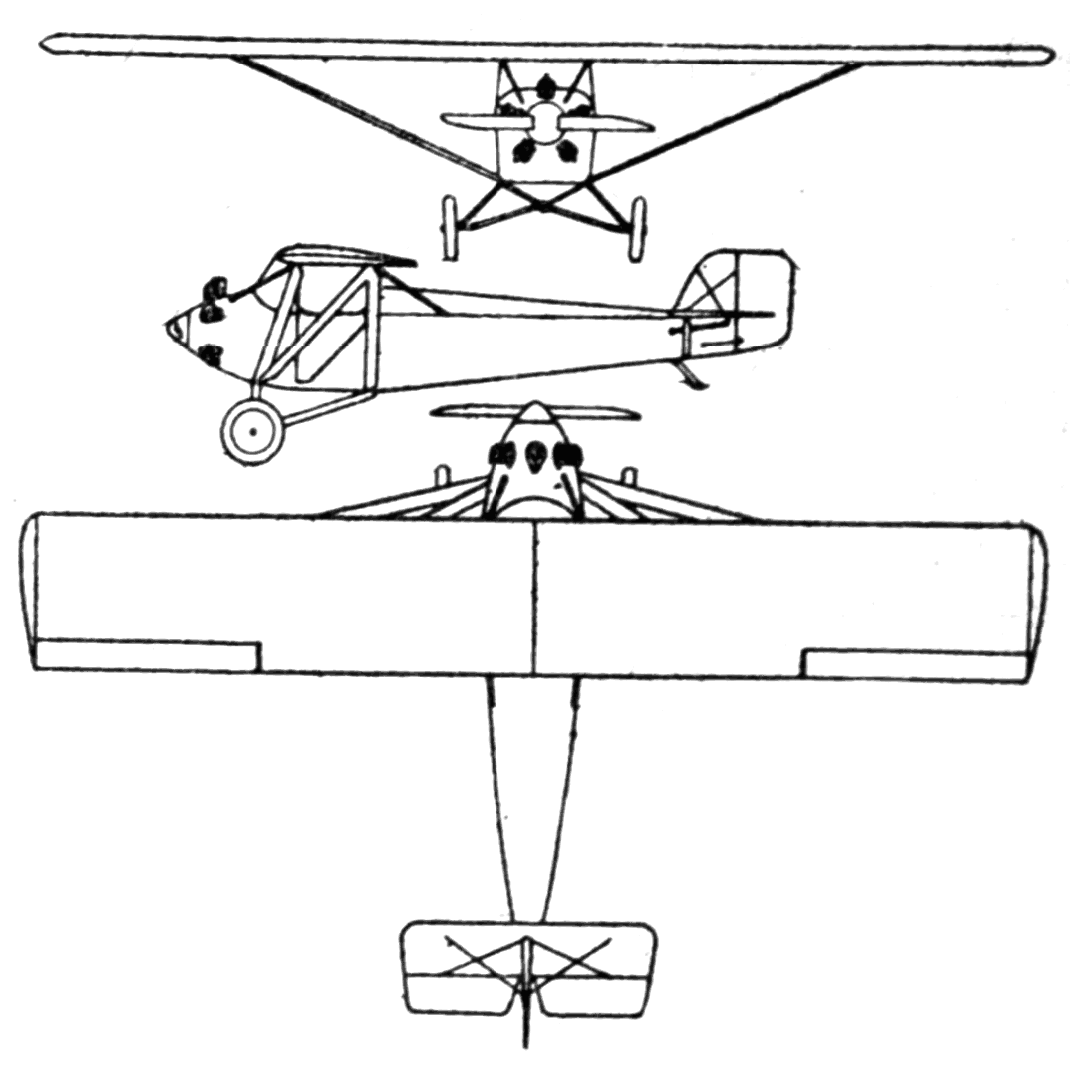
Taylor Chummy diagram

Data from

General characteristics

- Crew: 1
- Capacity: one passenger
- Length: 22 ft 6 in (6.86 m)
- Wingspan: 34 ft 0 in (10.36 m)
- Height: 7 ft 6 in (2.29 m)
- Empty weight: 1,082 lb (491 kg)
- Gross weight: 1,643 lb (745 kg)
- Fuel capacity: 24 U.S. gal (91 L) usable fuel
- Powerplant: 1 × Kinner K-5 5-cylinder air-cooled radial piston engine, 90 hp (67 kW)
- Propellers: 2-bladed fixed-pitch propeller

Performance

- Maximum speed: 110 mph (180 km/h, 96 kn)
- Cruise speed: 90 mph (140 km/h, 78 kn)
- Stall speed: 38 mph (61 km/h, 33 kn) with flaps down
- Range: 400 mi (640 km, 350 nmi) with reserve fuel
- Rate of climb: 750 ft/min (3.8 m/s) at sea level

== Bibliography ==
- Peperell, Roger W.; Smith, Colin M. (1987). Piper Aircraft and their forerunners. Air-Britain (Historians) Limited. ISBN 0-85130-149-5.
