= Taylor Cub =

American light aircraft

Cub
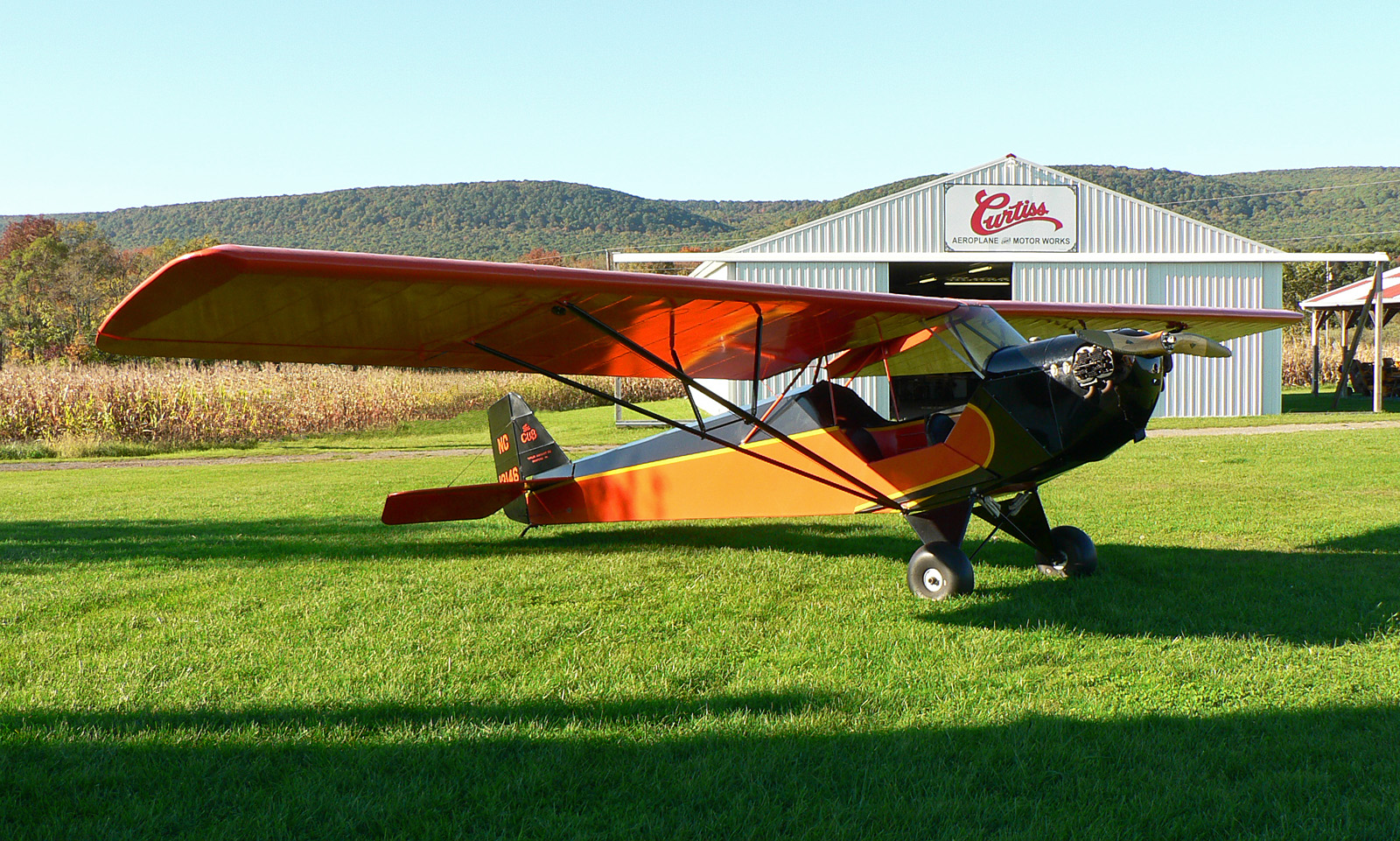
- Taylor E-2 Cub at the Golden Age Air Museum in Bethel, Pennsylvania.

General information
- Type: Light utility aircraft
- Manufacturer: Taylor Aircraft Company
- Designer: C. Gilbert Taylor
- Number built: 353

History
- Manufactured: 1930–1936
- First flight: 12 September 1930
- Developed from: Taylor Chummy
- Variants: Taylor J-2
- Developed into: Piper J-3

The Taylor Cub was originally designed by C. Gilbert Taylor as a small, light and simple utility aircraft, evolved from the Taylor Chummy. It is the forefather of the popular Piper J-3 Cub, and total production of the Cub series was 23,512 aircraft.

== Design and development ==
In 1930 with C. G. Taylor as Chief Engineer, the Taylor Aircraft Company embarked on the production of a two-seat tandem low-powered aircraft, designated the Taylor Cub. The Cub featured a design with wings mounted high on the fuselage, an open cockpit, fabric-covered tubular steel fuselage and wooden wings which used the USA-35B airfoil. It was originally powered by a 20 horsepower (15 kilowatts) Brownback "Tiger Kitten" engine. Since the young offspring of the tiger is called a cub, Taylor's accountant, Gilbert Hadrel, was inspired to name the little airplane "The Cub".

The "Tiger Kitten" engine roared but was not strong enough to power the Cub. On September 12, 1930, a test flight of the Taylor Cub ended abruptly when the aircraft ran out of runway; the underpowered engine was unable to lift the monoplane higher than five feet (1.5 meters) above the ground. In October, a Salmson AD-9 radial engine produced in France was fitted to the Cub giving good performance, but it was expensive to maintain.

Finally in February 1931, Taylor introduced an improved Cub airframe, powered by the newly developed Continental Motors 37 horsepower (27.6 kilowatt) A-40 engine. The new Taylor E-2 Cub was awarded Category 2 or "Memo" certificate 2-358 on June 15, 1931, and licensed by the U.S. Department of Commerce for manufacture (it was later awarded full Approved Type Certificate A-455 on November 7). Twenty-two E-2 Cubs were sold during 1931, retailing for $1,325; by 1935, cost had increased to $1475 and by the end of production in February 1936, 353 Cubs had been built at Emery Airport, Bradford, Pennsylvania.

== Variants ==
Approved Type Certificate A-525 for the Taylor F-2.

Taylor E-2
Prototype first flown in September 1930 with a 20 hp (15 kW) Brownbach Tiger Kitten engine, engine changed to a 40 hp (30 kW) Salmson D-9 radial in October 1930. although the D-9 had enough power for the E-2 it was expensive and was built to metric sizes which would have caused maintenance problems.
Taylor E-2 Cub
Production variant of the E-2 with the Continental A-40-2 or in later production the improved A-40-3 engine, produced from 1931 to 1936.
Taylor F-2
Persistent troubles with the early A-40 engines on the E-2 led to a search for other suitable powerplants. First choice was the Aeromarine AR-3-40, a three-cylinder air-cooled radial engine which produced 40 horsepower at 2050 RPM. The Aeromarine-powered Cub was designated the F-2. One float-equipped aircraft was designated F-2S.

Approved Type Certificate A-525 was awarded on February 16, 1934, and the F-2 had an initial price of $1495. Approximately 33 were made.

Taylor G-2
In another search for a replacement for the A-40, Taylor went to the extreme of designing and building his own 35-40 horsepower engine. This was fitted to serial number 149, registration X14756. The Taylor-powered Cub was designated the G-2.

No information was published about the one-off engine, and no details are known today. With a new engine, this aircraft would become the Taylor H-2.

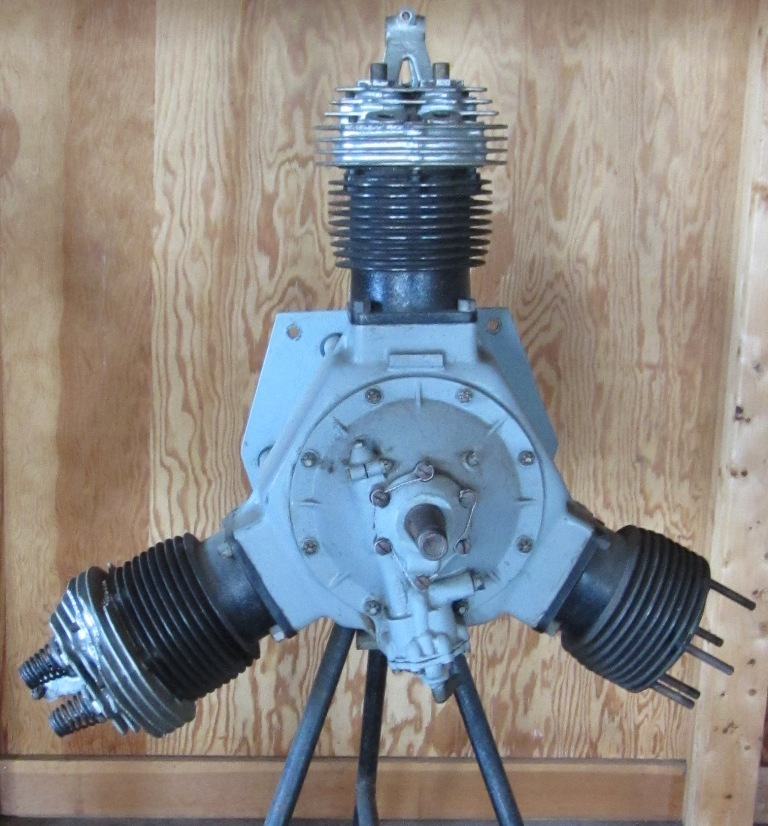
a Szekely radial engine on display

Taylor H-2
The G-2 Cub was re-engined with a 35 horsepower Szekely SR-3-35 (pronounced Say-Kai), another three-cylinder air-cooled radial engine which produced 35 hp at 1750 RPM. The Szekely-powered Cub was designated the H-2.

Approved Type Certificate A-572 was awarded on May 28, 1935. Three F-2's were converted to H-2 standard (construction numbers 40, 66 and 74), as was a single J-2 (c/n 792).

In 1937, Beverly Dodge and a passenger set the women's altitude record (16,800 feet) in a Szekely powered Taylor H-2.

Taylor J-2
The Taylor J-2 was the final iteration of the Cub series under the Taylor name, before the company renamed itself to Piper Aircraft in November 1937, production had moved from Bradford to Lock Haven, Pennsylvania earlier in 1937 following the destruction of the Bradford factory by fire.

Taylorcraft A
When C. G. Taylor broke with Taylor Aircraft and founded the new company Taylor-Young, its first aircraft, originally known as the Taylor-Young Model A, was little more than a refined Cub with side-by-side seating. Taylor-Young soon changed its name to Taylorcraft and the Model A became the Taylorcraft A, first in the Taylorcraft series.

== Operators ==
=== Military operators ===
Nicaragua

- Nicaraguan Air Force - One aircraft

== Surviving aircraft ==
=== Canada ===
- 289 – E-2 on static display at the Canada Aviation and Space Museum in Ottawa, Ontario.

=== United States ===
- 32 – E-2 airworthy at the Western Antique Aeroplane & Automobile Museum in Hood River, Oregon.
- 33 – E-2 on display at the Shannon Air Museum in Fredericksburg, Virginia.
- 36 – E-2 airworthy at the Western North Carolina Air Museum in Hendersonville, North Carolina.
- 54 – E-2 airworthy at the Golden Age Air Museum in Bethel, Pennsylvania.
- 83 – E-2 airworthy at the Old Rhinebeck Aerodrome in Red Hook, New York.
- 283 – E-2 airworthy at the Kelch Aviation Museum in Brodhead, Wisconsin.

== Specifications (Taylor E-2 Cub) ==
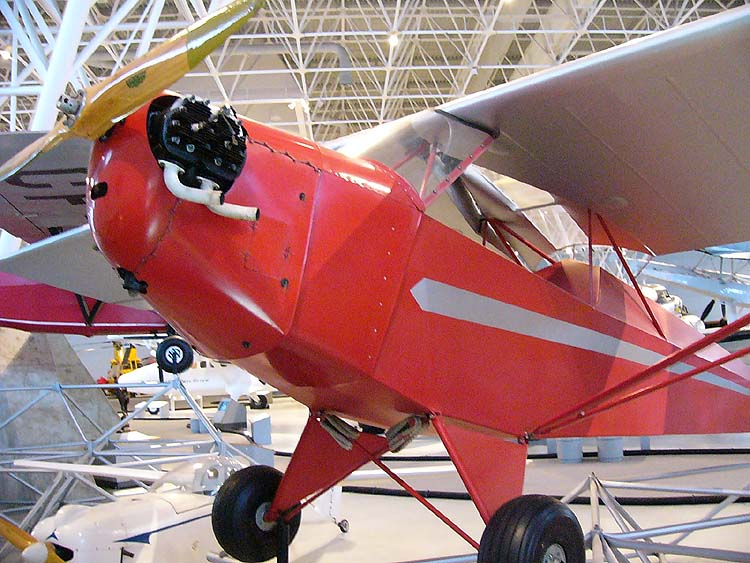
Taylor E-2 Cub on display at the Canada Aviation and Space Museum in Ottawa, Ontario

Data from

General characteristics

- Crew: one
- Capacity: one passenger
- Length: 22 ft 6 in (6.86 m)
- Wingspan: 35 ft 2 in (10.72 m)
- Height: 6 ft 6 in (1.98 m)
- Wing area: 184 sq ft (17.1 m^{2})
- Empty weight: 510 lb (231 kg)
- Max takeoff weight: 970 lb (440 kg)
- Powerplant: 1 × Continental A40-2 4-cylinder air-cooled horizontally-opposed piston engine, 35 hp (26 kW)
- Propellers: 2-bladed fixed-pitch propeller

Performance

- Maximum speed: 80 mph (130 km/h, 70 kn)
- Cruise speed: 70 mph (110 km/h, 61 kn)
- Range: 225 mi (362 km, 196 nmi)
- Service ceiling: 12,000 ft (3,700 m)
- Rate of climb: 400 ft/min (2.0 m/s)
- Wing loading: 6 lb/sq ft (29 kg/m^{2})
- Power/mass: 0.04 hp/lb (0.066 kW/kg)

== See also ==
Related development

- EAY-201
- Taylor Bird
- Taylor J-2 Cub
- Piper J-3 Cub

Aircraft of comparable role, configuration, and era

- Aeronca C-2
