= William T. Piper =

American airplane manufacturer and businessman

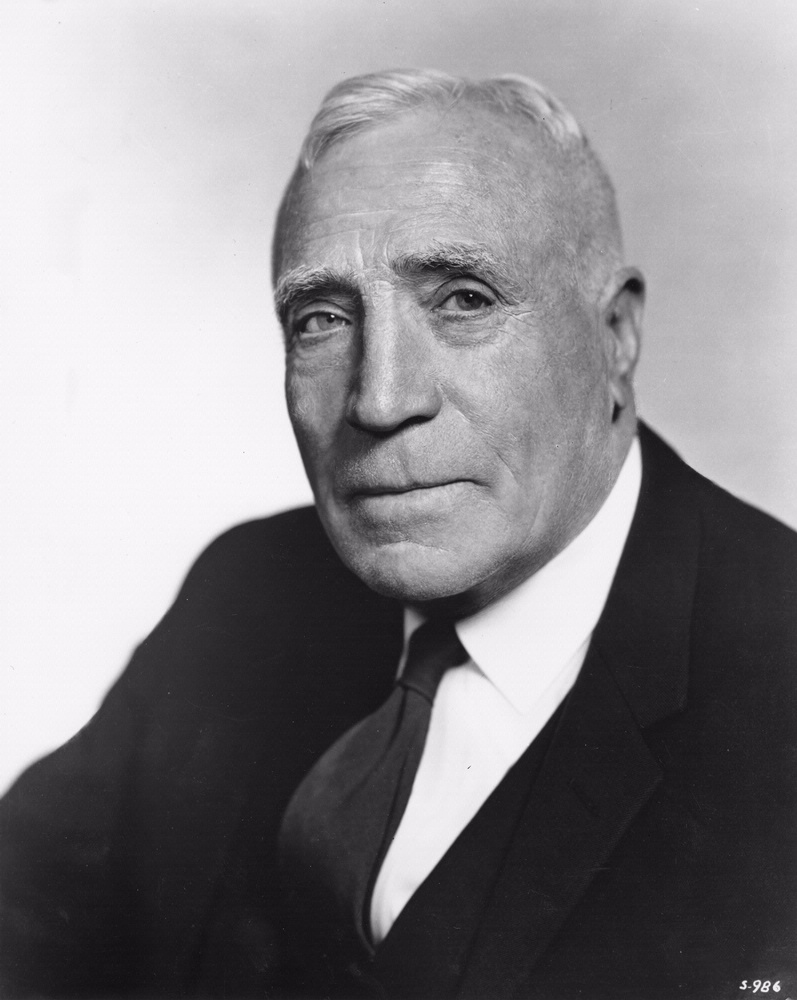
- Piper in 1957
- Born: William Thomas Piper; January 8, 1881; Knapp Creek, New York, U.S.
- Died: January 15, 1970 (aged 89); Lock Haven, Pennsylvania, U.S.
- Resting place: Highland Cemetery
- Occupations: Businessman, engineer
- Known for: Founder of Piper Aircraft
- Spouse: Maria Theresa Van DeWater (m. 1910— her death 1937)
- Children: 5; William Jr., Thomas, Howard, Mary, and Elizabeth
- Military career
- Allegiance: United States
- Branch: United States Army
- Service years: 1897–1915

William Thomas Piper Sr. (January 8, 1881 – January 15, 1970) was an American aviation and oil industry businessman. He was the founding president of the Piper Aircraft Corporation and led the company from 1929 until his death in 1970. He graduated from Harvard University in 1903 and later became known as "the Henry Ford of aviation".

Prior to Piper's successful business career he was an officer in the United States Army serving in the Spanish–American War. He was then in the United States Army Corps of Engineers during World War I. In total Piper served 18 years in the Army. When he returned from World War I he was primarily an investor and businessman in the oil industry until 1929 when he became an investor in the Taylor Brothers Aircraft Corporation. He went on to purchase the soon-renamed Taylor Aircraft Corporation and head it until reorganizing the company into Piper Aircraft in 1937, eventually seeing tremendous success and becoming a well-known aviation figure of the 20th century. Piper Aircraft sold over 80,000 units when he oversaw the company, cementing Piper as a global aerospace manufacturing power.

Piper was posthumously inducted in the National Aviation Hall of Fame class of 1980. The William T. Piper Memorial Airport in Lock Haven, Pennsylvania is named in his honor. Piper's son William Piper Jr. took over the company after Piper Sr. died in 1970. At the time of the elder Piper's death, he was worth an estimated $55 million (over $347 million in 2017 dollars), ranking him within the Forbes 400 richest people in the world in 1970.

== Biography ==
=== Early life ===
Piper was born on January 8, 1881, in Knapp Creek, New York, Cattaraugus County 8 miles South of Olean, NY. Piper was the second youngest of 5 children of Thomas and Sarah Elizabeth Piper (née Maltby). His father dabbled both in dairy farming and in the promising crude oil business as Piper was growing up often helping his father. By the time he was eight, Piper was milking cows and walking several miles to a one-room country school. At the age of nine he introduced himself to the oil business when he assisted his father in the task of repairing well pumps. When family finances improved, the Piper family moved to Bradford, Pennsylvania.

In 1898, due to the sinking of the USS Maine, Piper lied about his age and joined the United States Army. Piper attended Harvard University where he was on the track and field team. He graduated in 1903 with honors with a degree in business and mechanical engineering.

=== Military and aviation career ===
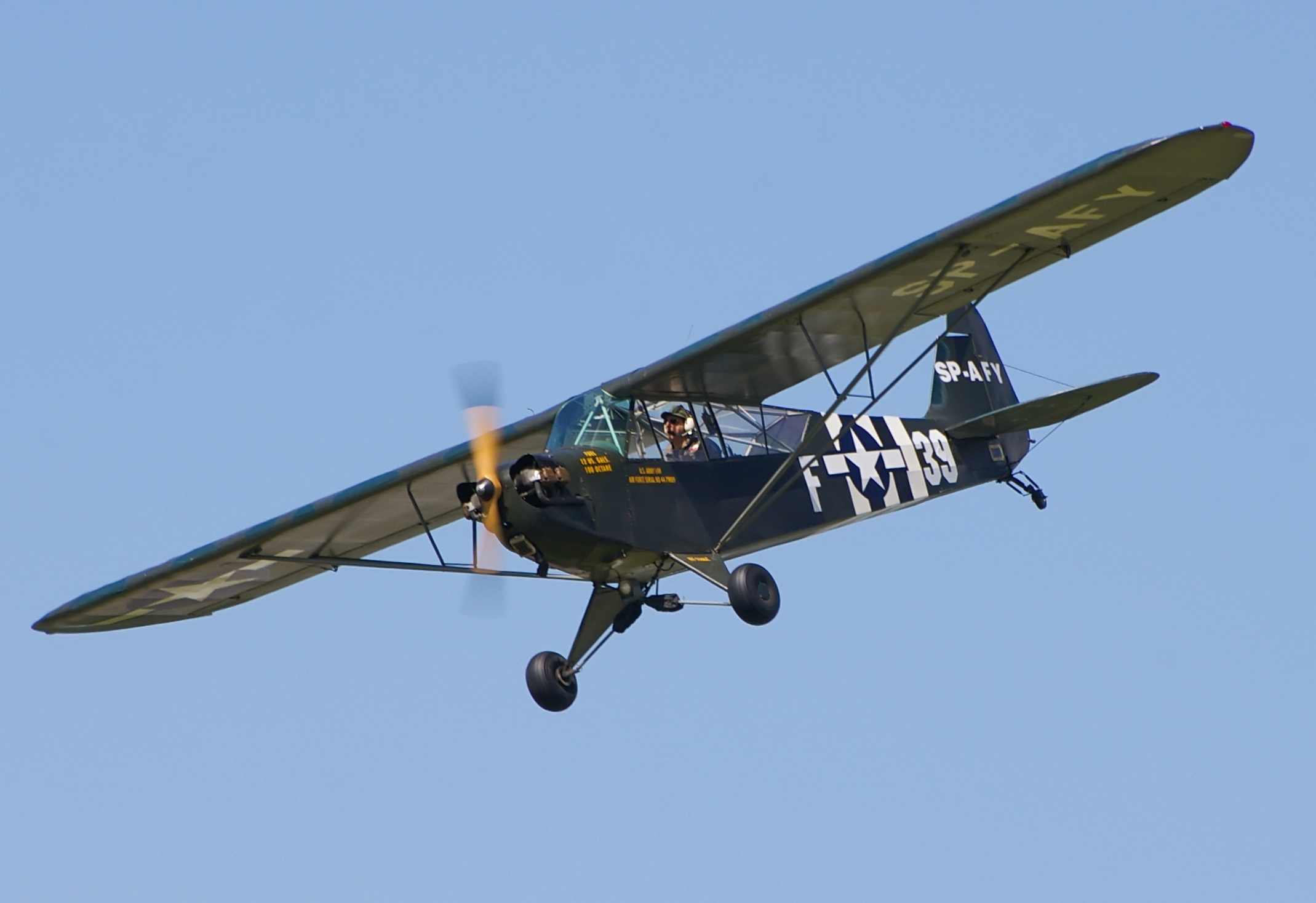
Piper J-3 Cub, the company's most influential aircraft

In 1929, he became the original investor in the Taylor Brothers Aircraft Corporation for $400 ($5,647 in 2017 dollars), led then by aircraft designer and aviation entrepreneur Clarence Gilbert Taylor. A year later, during the onset of the Great Depression, the company went bankrupt and Piper bought its assets and reorganized it into the Taylor Aircraft Corporation, keeping Gilbert Taylor on as president. During this period, he sought to manufacture reliable and affordable light aircraft. In 1937, two years after Piper bought out Gilbert Taylor from the company due in part to contentious clashes between the two, he established the Piper Aircraft Corporation and, by 1940, it dominated the light aircraft market. At the time, a Piper Cub and flying lessons cost $1,325 ($19,808 in 2017 dollars). The Piper Cub (which derives from the Taylor Cub) would go on to become the most-produced fabric-covered monoplane in history, with over 20,000 units delivered from 1938 to 1947. Its simplicity, affordability and popularity often invokes comparisons to the Ford Model T.

In 1963, Piper supported Betty Miller's successful attempt to be the first female pilot to fly solo across the Pacific Ocean, during which she delivered a twin-engine Piper aircraft from Oakland, California, USA to Brisbane, Queensland, Australia.

== Death and legacy ==
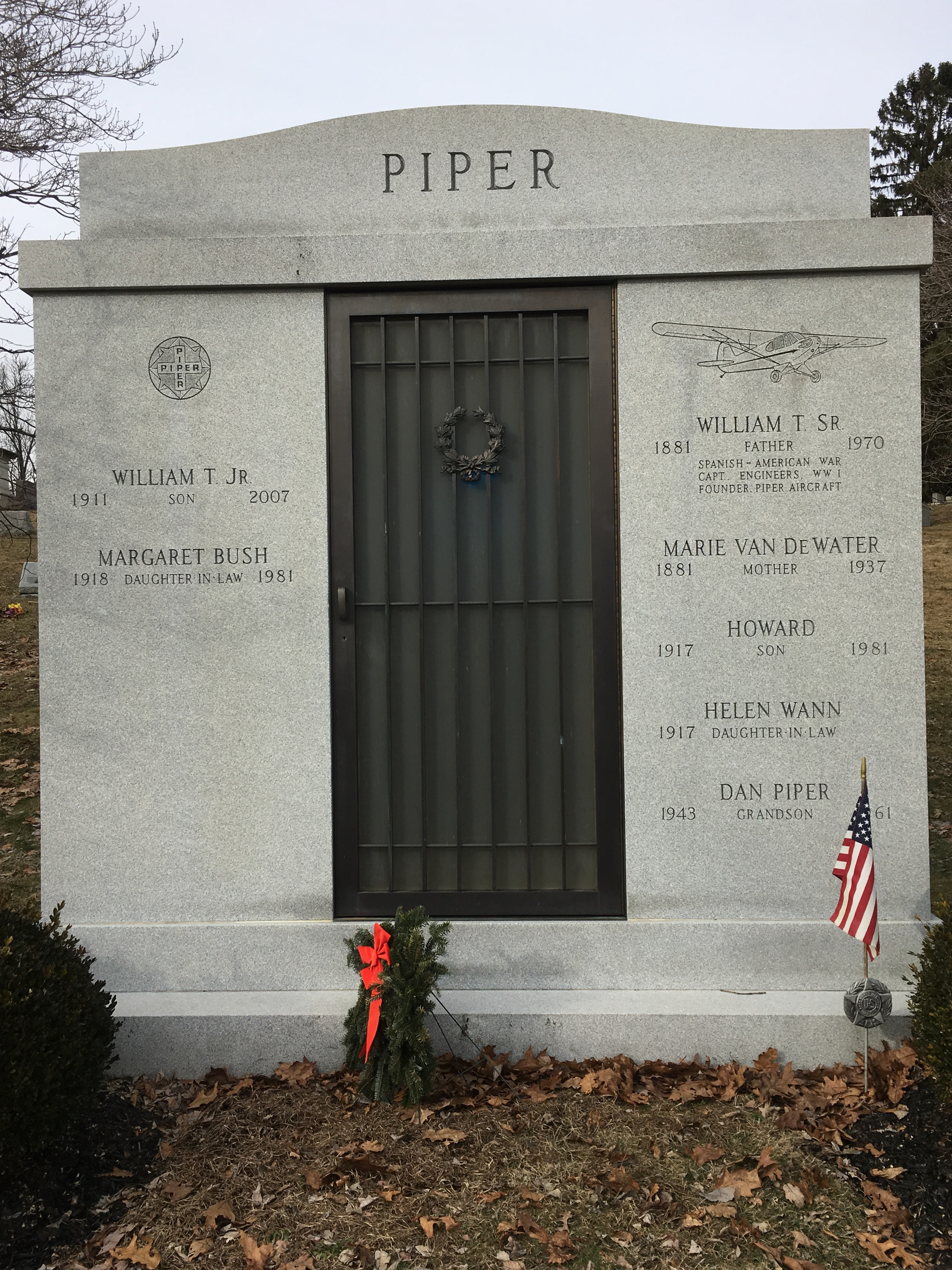
The Piper family mausoleum located atop Highland Cemetery in Lock Haven, where William is interred

Piper died in his home in Lock Haven due to natural causes on January 15, 1970. Just prior to his death, in 1968, Piper's son, William Piper, Jr., took over the company and was appointed president. In 1970, Piper Jr. was also named chairman by the board, and in 1973, Piper Aircraft was sold, moving from Pennsylvania to where it is located today, Vero Beach, Florida.

In 1980, William Piper was posthumously inducted into the National Aviation Hall of Fame. In 1993, Piper was inducted into the International Air & Space Hall of Fame at the San Diego Air & Space Museum. The William T. Piper Memorial Airport in Lock Haven, Pennsylvania is named in his honor.

Ever since 2009, the William T. Piper Scholarship has been awarded nationally to high school students looking to pursue a career within aviation.

== In popular culture ==
Piper's appearances in literature, film and theater:

=== Literature ===
- Mr. Piper and His Cubs (ISBN 9780813812502) published in 1996 discusses Piper's founding of Piper Aircraft as well as the design, development and production of the Piper Cub.
- Piper Cub Tales (ISBN 9780978826031) published in 2012.
- Flight of Passage (ISBN 9780786883158)
- Those Legendary Piper Cubs: Their Role In War And Peace (ISBN 9780764321597) talks about Piper's involvement in the Cub program and how the aircraft was instrumental in war in the air.

=== Film ===
- How It's Made, (TV Series) season 26, episode 14 shows how Piper Aircraft build planes, with Piper's legacy discussed.
- The Amazing Piper (Documentary)
- Light Aircraft in America (Documentary)
