= Clarence Gilbert Taylor =

American aircraft designer and entrepreneur

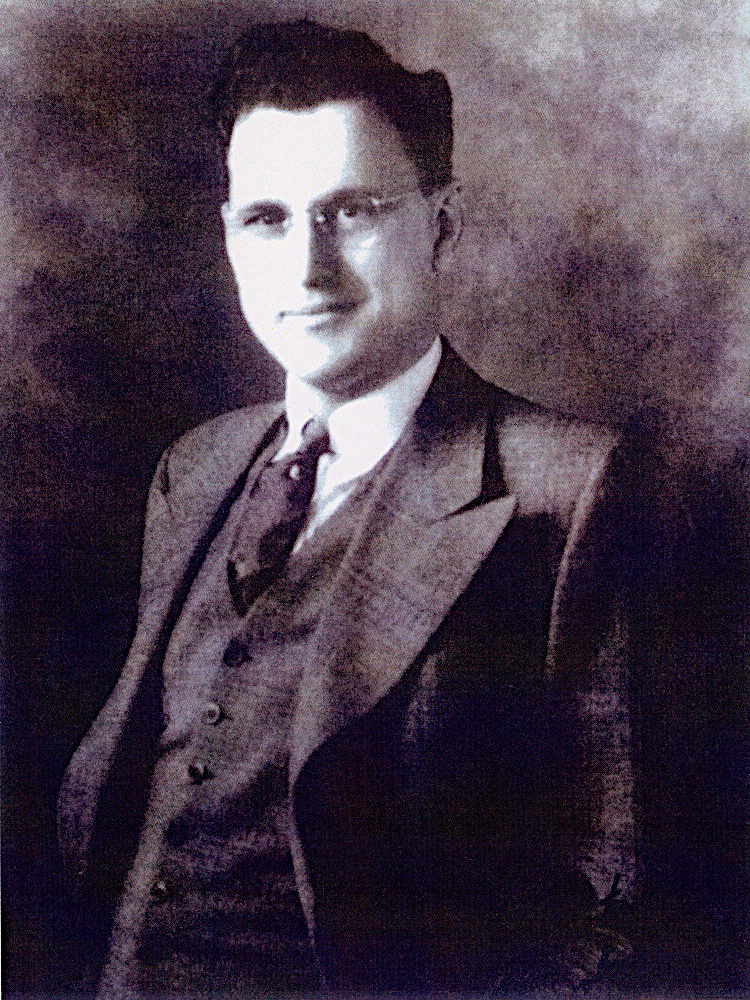
Clarence Gilbert Taylor

Clarence Gilbert Taylor (September 8, 1898 – March 29, 1988) was an early American aviation entrepreneur and co-founder of the Taylor Brothers Aircraft Corporation (later named the Piper Aircraft Corporation) in Rochester, New York. He was the designer of the Taylor Cub aircraft, which led to the creation of the Piper Cub, one of the most popular airplanes in history.

== Biography ==
Gilbert was born on September 8, 1898, in Rochester, New York to Arthur and Clara (née Makin) Taylor, who had immigrated to the United States from Nottingham, England, in 1889. He was one of six children including his brother Gordon A. Taylor (January 15, 1902 – April 24, 1928). Gilbert co-founded the Taylor Brothers Aircraft Corporation with Gordon in 1927. A year later, Gordon was killed, along with an early sales agent for the brothers' aircraft, during a demonstration flight for a prototype of their Taylor Chummy airplane at Ford Airport in Dearborn, Michigan.

After his brother's death, Gilbert moved the company to Bradford, Pennsylvania, where he remained until 1936. During his time in Bradford, the company was renamed to the Taylor Aircraft Company after investor William T. Piper bought the assets of the company in 1930. Piper kept Gilbert on as president, but after clashes between the two, Piper bought Gilbert out and he left to start Taylorcraft Aviation in 1935. Two years later, Piper renamed the company to what is now known as Piper Aircraft. It went on to build more than 20,000 Taylor-designed Piper Cubs, the most-produced fabric-covered aircraft of all time.
