= William T. Piper Jr. =

American aviation businessman

- Born: William Thomas Piper Jr. September 8, 1911; Sharpsburg, Pennsylvania, U.S.
- Died: August 23, 2007 (aged 95); Danville, Pennsylvania, U.S.
- Known for: Second president of Piper Aircraft
- Spouse: Elizabeth Piper
- Parent: William T. Piper (father)

William Thomas Piper Jr. (September 8, 1911 – August 24, 2007) was an American businessman and president of the Piper Aircraft Corporation from 1968 to 1973. He oversaw the company through its sale to Bangor Punta Corporation in 1969, and after his father's death in 1970, who was the first and founding president of the manufacturer.

Piper Jr. was born in 1911 to William T. Piper Sr. and Marie Theresa Piper (née Van DeWater). As a young boy Piper Jr. was very interested in business; he created his own shoe-cleaning service in Lock Haven when he was just 7. He often went to work with his father and was fascinated by airplanes as well. As young men, Piper Jr. and his two brothers Howard and Thomas worked at the Piper factory and learned how to fly.

Piper Jr. attended Harvard University just like his father and upon graduation was put in charge of the sales department. He ran an aggressive marketing campaign in the Western United States where Piper Cub sales had struggled in years past. On a business trip to Los Angeles Piper Jr. became lifelong friends with James Bacon.

Upon his father's death, Piper Jr. was voted as president by the Piper Aircraft board of advisors and remained in that position until 1973. After the company was sold to Bangor Punta in 1969, an eight-year court battle with the losing bidder, Chris-Craft Industries, culminated in a US Supreme Court decision in 1977. Piper Aircraft would later move to where it is located today, at Vero Beach, Florida. Piper Jr. remained living in his home in Lock Haven, Pennsylvania and Marco Island, Florida.

On August 20, 2007, Piper Jr. fell on one step going out to the deck at his summer home in Lock Haven. He was taken to the local hospital then transferred to Geisinger Medical Center in Danville Pa. He had surgery on his hip the following day. On August 24, W. T. Piper Jr. died unexpectedly in his hospital bed. An autopsy was not conducted.

== See also ==
- List of Piper aircraft
- List of Harvard University people
