= Piper PA-31T Cheyenne =

Turboprop-powered series of the PA-31 light transport aircraft

PA-31T Cheyenne
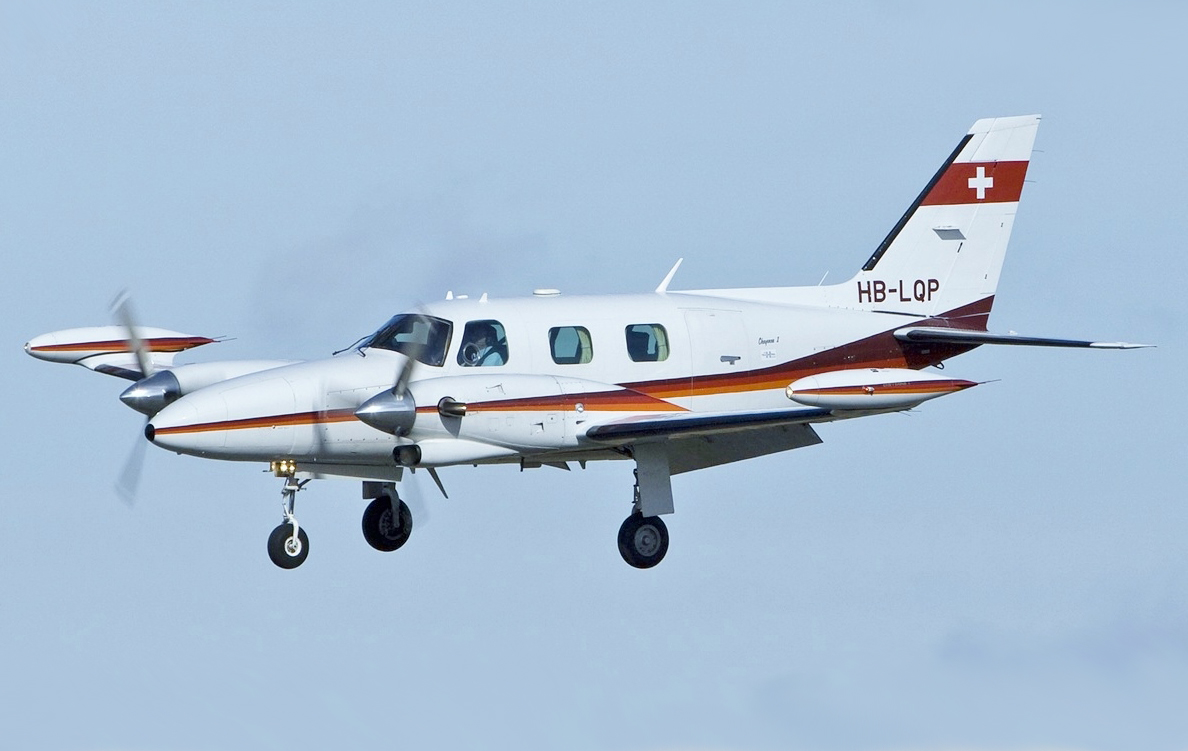
- PA-31T1 Cheyenne in landing configuration

General information
- Type: Turboprop
- Manufacturer: Piper Aircraft
- Number built: 823

History
- Manufactured: 1974–1985
- First flight: 29 August 1969
- Developed from: Piper PA-31 Navajo
- Developed into: Piper PA-42 Cheyenne

The Piper PA-31T Cheyenne is a twin-engine turboprop development of the earlier PA-31P Pressurized Navajo.

== Development ==
Originally, the aircraft was an upgraded version of the Pressurized Navajo equipped with two Pratt & Whitney Canada PT6A-28 turboprop engines. Later, the aircraft was further refined and developed, including aerodynamic improvements and fuselage extensions. The PA-31T led to the development of the PA-42 Cheyenne III and IV.

== Operators ==
=== Government operators ===
Indonesia

- Indonesian National Police

=== Military operators ===
Mauritania

- Mauritanian Air Force

United States

- United States Department of Defense

== Variants ==
PA-31T Cheyenne
Initial production version, powered by two 620-shp (462-kW) Pratt & Whitney Canada PT6A-28 turboprop engines

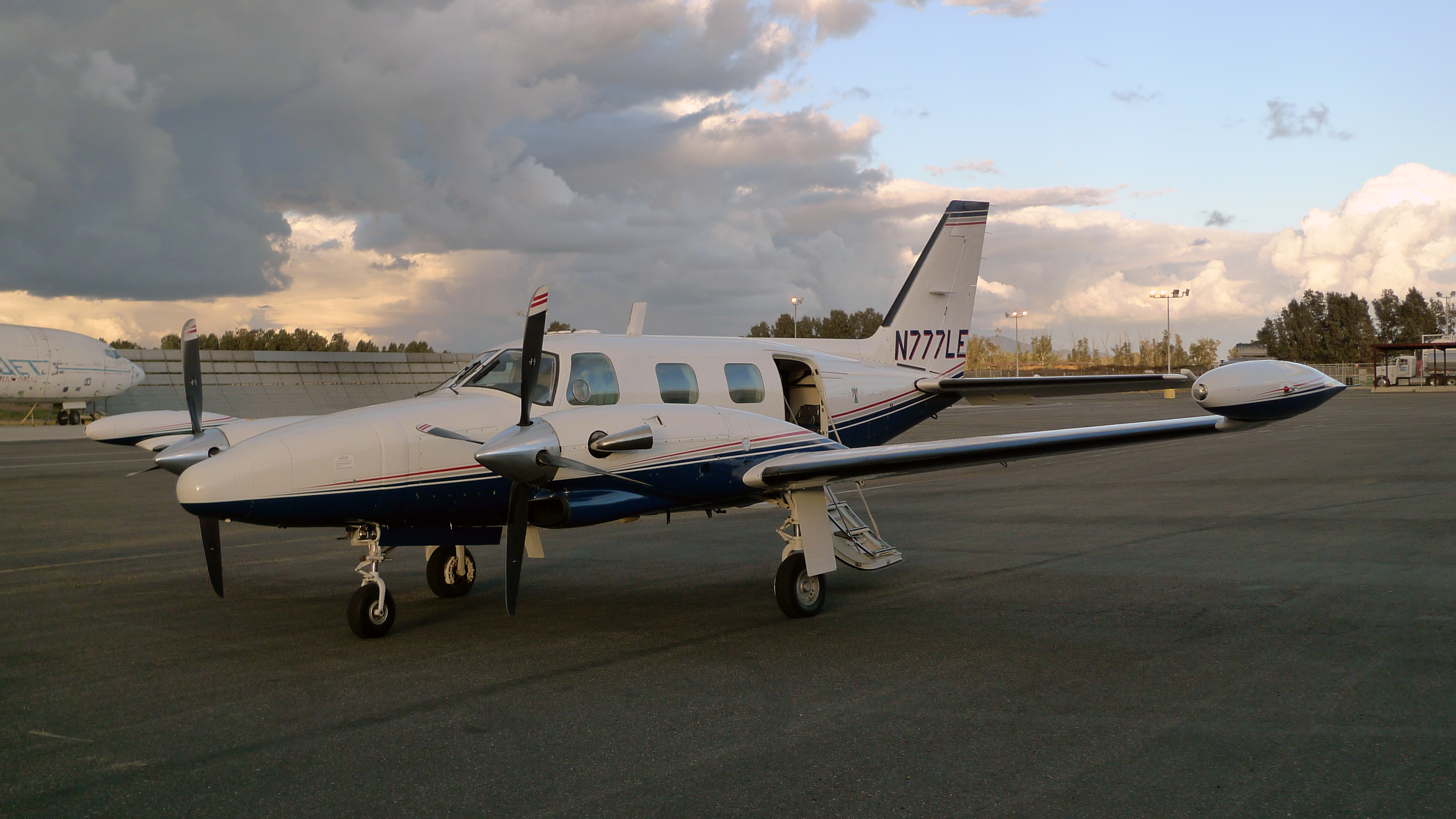
Piper PA-31T Cheyenne

PA-31T-1
Original designation of the PT-31T Cheyenne I. Powered by 500-shp (373-kW) Pratt & Whitney Canada PT6A-II turboprop engines
PA-31T Cheyenne II
Improved version, renamed version of original powered by two 620-shp (462-kW) Pratt & Whitney Canada PT6A-28 turboprop engines
PA-31T2 Cheyenne IIXL
Stretched version, powered by two 750-shp (559-kW) Pratt & Whitney Canada PT6A-135 turboprop engines

== Accidents and incidents ==
- On April 12, 2015, four people were killed when their Piper PA-31T Cheyenne reported a distress call for smoke in the aircraft upon approaching Fort Lauderdale for landing after taking off from Orlando. The aircraft crashed into a wildlife preserve just short of the airport, causing a large fire killing all on board.
- On April 17, 2017, a Piper PA-31T Cheyenne crashed in a parking lot of a Lidl supermarket in Tires, Portugal. The pilot and one person on the ground were killed in the crash.
- On December 28, 2019, a Piper PA-31T Cheyenne crashed shortly after takeoff, approximately one nautical mile from LFT. The pilot was able to avoid an apartment complex but the aircraft struck a vehicle and a USPS branch on its way down. Four passengers and the pilot were killed on impact. One passenger and one person on the ground were seriously injured, while two additional people on the ground suffered minor injuries. The NTSB released a preliminary report and is investigating the accident.
- On April 20, 2020, a Piper PA-31T Cheyenne N926K crashed just west of Billings Logan International Airport in a local gun and archery establishment. The sole occupant, the pilot, received fatal injuries due to smoke inhalation. A probable cause by some locals favored a possible engine failure upon initial climbout.
- On October 22, 2025, a Piper PA-31T Cheyenne crashed shortly after takeoff from Paramillo Airport, Táchira, Venezuela. The two occupants died in the explosion.

== Specifications ==
Data from Jane's All the World's Aircraft 1976–77

General characteristics

- Crew: 2
- Capacity: 4–6 passengers
- Length: 34 ft 8 in (10.57 m)
- Wingspan: 42 ft 8 1/4 in (13.011 m) (over tip tanks)
- Height: 12 ft 9 in (3.89 m)
- Wing area: 229 sq ft (21.3 m^{2})
- Airfoil: NACA 63_{2}-415 at root, 63A212 at tip
- Empty weight: 4,870 lb (2,209 kg)
- Max takeoff weight: 9,000 lb (4,082 kg)
- Fuel capacity: 382 US gal (318 imp gal; 1,450 L) usable fuel
- Powerplant: 2 × Pratt & Whitney Canada PT6A-28 turboprops, 620 shp (460 kW) each
- Propellers: 3-bladed Hartzell HC-BTN-3B constant-speed propellers, 7 ft 9 in (2.36 m) diameter

Performance

- Maximum speed: 326 mph (525 km/h, 283 kn) at 11,000 ft (3,400 m)
- Cruise speed: 244 mph (393 km/h, 212 kn) at 25,000 ft (7,600 m) (econ. cruise)
- Stall speed: 88 mph (142 km/h, 76 kn) (flaps down)
- Range: 1,702 mi (2,739 km, 1,479 nmi) (econ. cruise, 45 min reserves)
- Service ceiling: 29,000 ft (8,800 m)
- Rate of climb: 2,800 ft/min (14 m/s)
- Takeoff run to 50 ft (15 m): 1,980 ft (600 m)
- Landing run from 50 ft (15 m): 1,860 ft (570 m)

== See also ==
Related development

- Piper PA-31 Navajo
- Piper PA-42 Cheyenne

Aircraft of comparable role, configuration, and era

- Beechcraft King Air
- Cessna 425
- Cessna 441 Conquest II
- Mitsubishi Mu-2
