= Piper Aircraft =

Bruneian-owned aircraft manufacturer located in the United States

Piper Aircraft, Inc.
- Formerly: Taylor Brothers Aircraft Manufacturing Company (1927–1928); Taylor Brothers Aircraft Corporation (1928–1930); Taylor Aircraft Company (1930–1937); New Piper Aircraft (1995–2006)
- Type: State-owned enterprise
- Industry: General aviation
- Founded: 1927; 99 years ago in Rochester, New York
- Founders: William Piper; Clarence Taylor; Gordon Taylor
- Headquarters: Vero Beach, Florida, United States
- Key people: John Calcagno (President and CEO since April 2021), Danny Markford (Vice President and Chief Financial Officer)
- Products: Light aircraft
- Owner: Brunei Ministry of Finance
- Website: www.piper.com

Piper Aircraft, Inc. is a manufacturer of general aviation aircraft, located at the Vero Beach Regional Airport in Vero Beach, Florida, United States and owned since 2009 by the Government of Brunei. Throughout much of the mid-to-late 20th century, it was considered to be one of the "Big Three" in the field of general aviation manufacturing, along with Beechcraft and Cessna.

Between its founding in 1927 and the end of 2009, the company produced 144,000 aircraft in 160 certified models, of which 90,000 are still flying.

== History ==
Piper Aircraft Company factory in Lock Haven, Pennsylvania during the 1930s, with the Piper Cub logo superimposed at the top

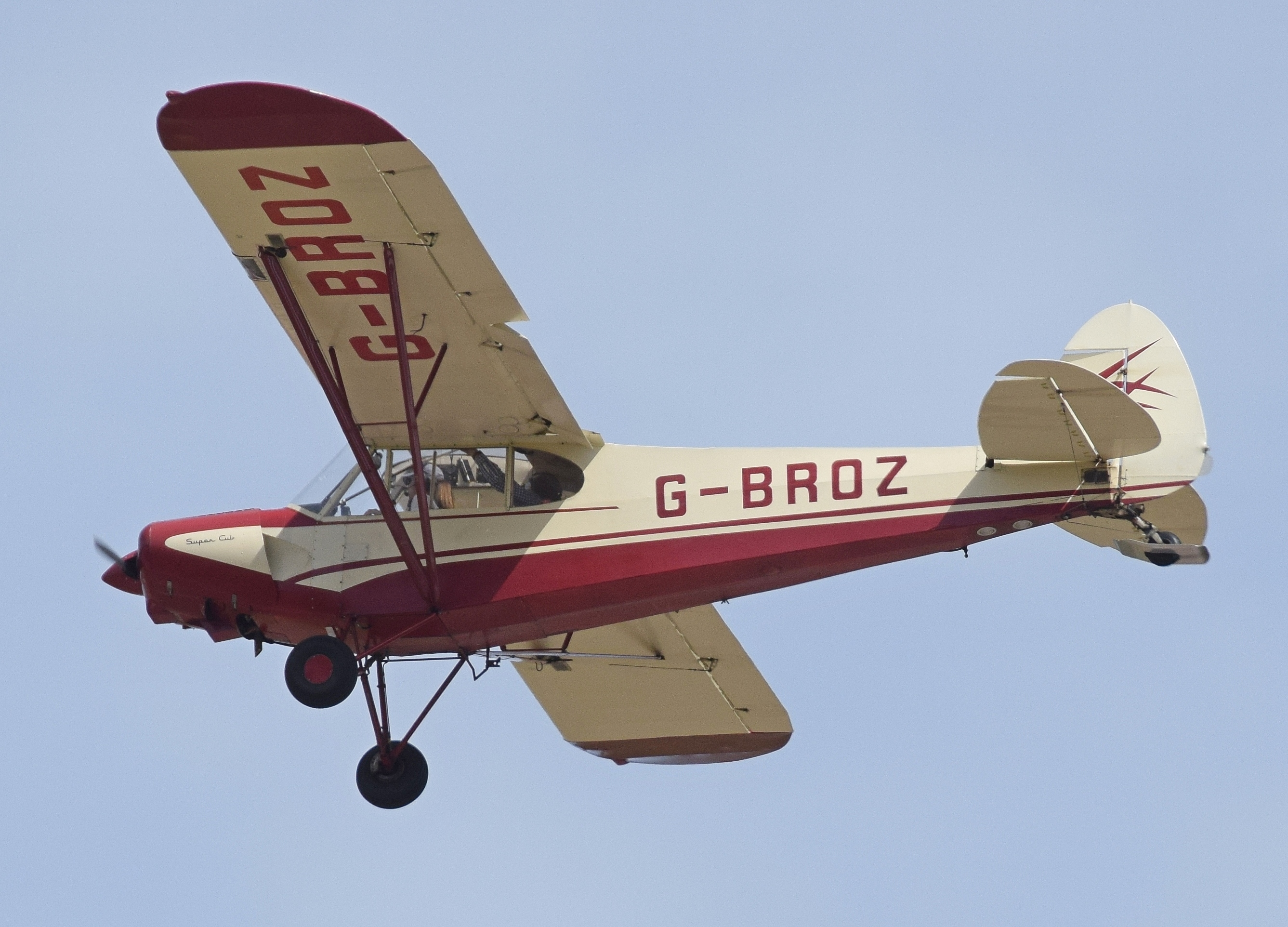
Piper PA-18-150 Super Cub. Built 1958.

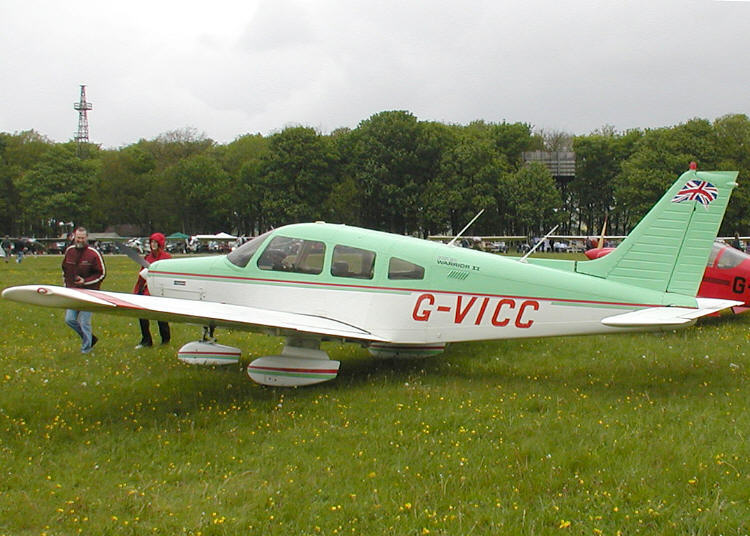
Piper PA-28-161 Warrior II

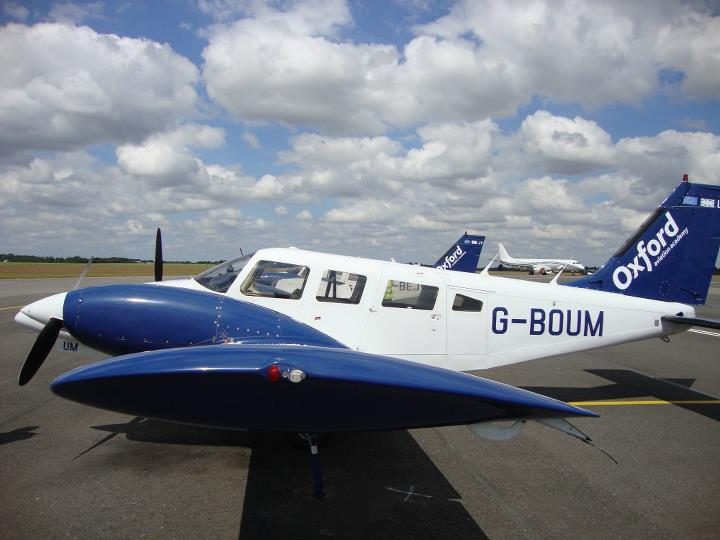
Piper PA-34-200T Seneca

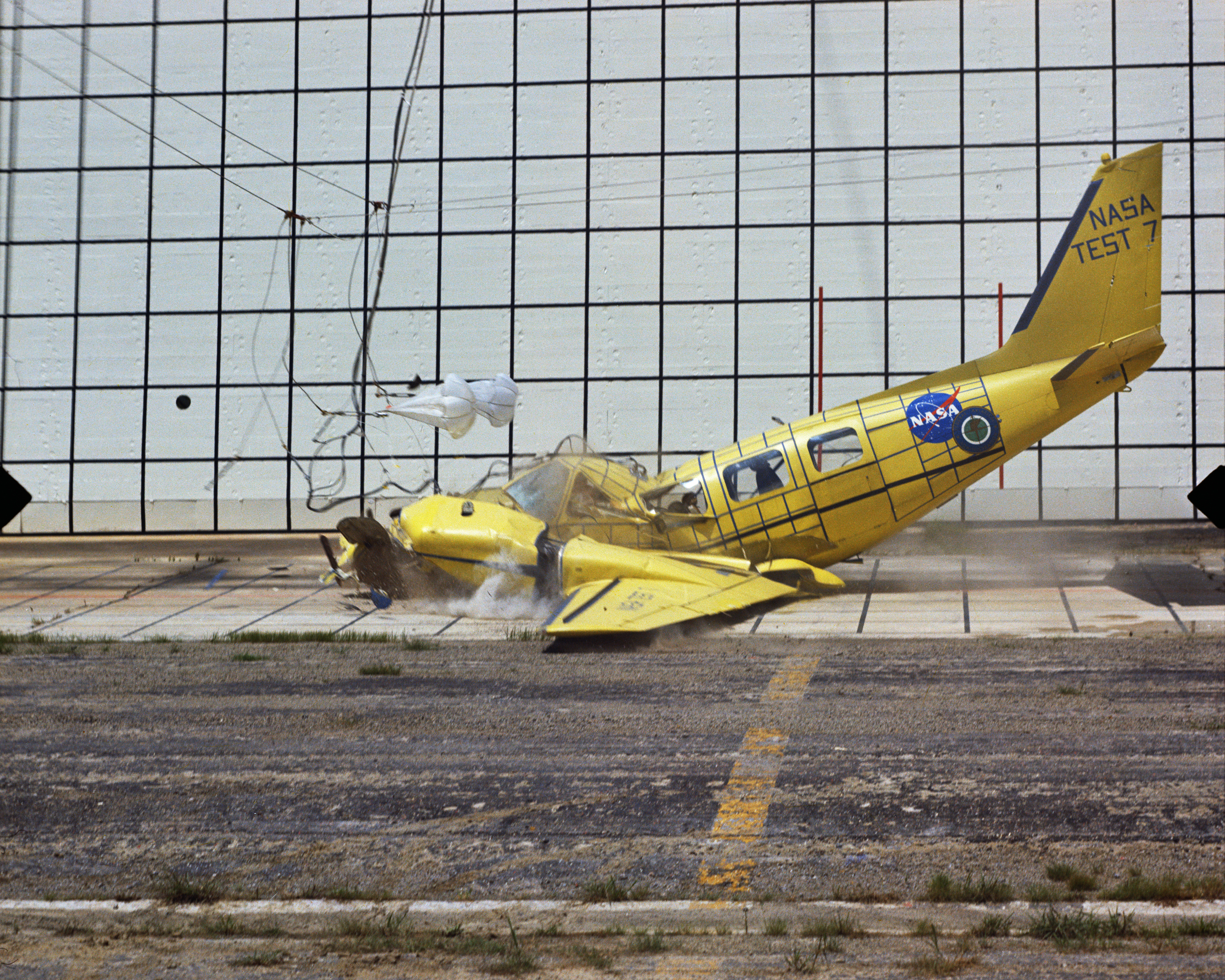
Piper PA-31 Navajo airframe used for crash testing by NASA after a 1972 flood inundated Piper's factory

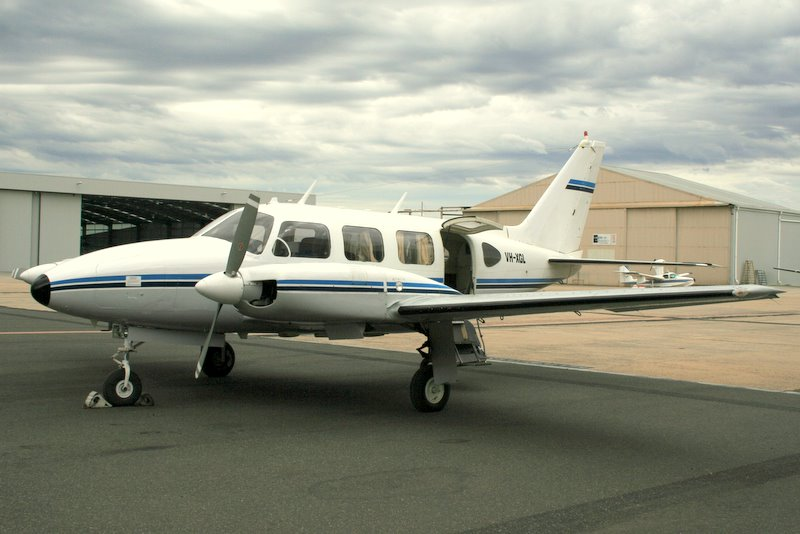
Early-production PA-31 Navajo

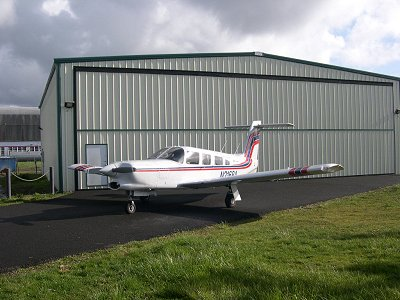
Piper PA-32RT-300T Turbo Lance II

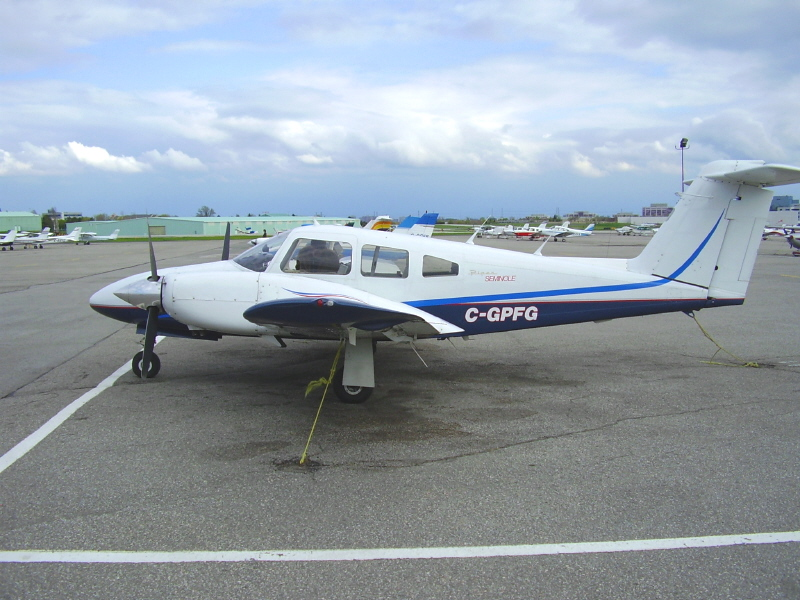
Piper PA-44-180 Seminole

The company was founded as the Taylor Brothers Aircraft Manufacturing Company in September 1927 by brothers Clarence G. Taylor and Gordon A. Taylor in Rochester, New York. The company was renamed Taylor Brothers Aircraft Corporation in April 1928, shortly before Gordon Taylor died in an aircraft accident flying one of the brothers' own designs, a Taylor Chummy, on April 24, 1928. The company was enticed to move to Bradford, Pennsylvania, with the promise of a larger facility and investment capital from local businessmen, including an initial investment of $400 from local oil industry engineer William T. Piper. The move was completed in September 1929.

=== 1930s ===
In late 1930, the company filed for bankruptcy and William T. Piper purchased the assets of the company for $761. Reorganized as the Taylor Aircraft Company, Piper effectively took control of the firm when he assumed the position of corporate secretary-treasurer, although he retained C. G. Taylor in the role of president. Piper, often called the "Henry Ford of Aviation", firmly believed a simple-to-operate, low-cost, private airplane would flourish, even in the darkest depths of the Great Depression. This aircraft was the E-2 Cub.

In December 1935, after a series of clashes, William Piper bought out C. G. Taylor, who left the company and went on to form the Taylorcraft Aircraft Company. On March 16, 1937, a fire destroyed the Bradford Piper factory and the company relocated to an abandoned silk mill in Lock Haven, Pennsylvania. In 1937, it was renamed Piper Aircraft Corporation.

=== 1940s ===
The company experienced a strike in June 1941, when employees stopped work to demand higher wages.

Piper continued operations in Lock Haven throughout World War II, building military versions of its J-3 Cub as the L-4 Grasshopper. A total of 5,941 powered aircraft were built by the company for the US armed forces during the war, as well as training gliders, and aircraft components for other manufacturers, but its main contribution to the war effort was in the fabrication of steel masts for mounting radar antennas. In 1946, the company opened a new factory in Ponca City, Oklahoma, and transferred production of the Cub from Lock Haven. That year, Piper led the American industry in light aircraft production. Almost 7,800 of the 35,000 civil aircraft built in the United States that year were Pipers, but a strike led to a shortage of steel tubing, interrupting production, and 1,900 workers had to be suspended as a result.

The following year, the postwar general aviation boom ended. This led to a downfall for the company. Piper's output reached 3,500 aircraft, less than half its 1946 total, and the company suffered an operating loss of more than $560,000. The board of directors replaced William Piper with William Shriver, a former Chrysler executive. Under Shriver, the product line was expanded with the introduction of the PA-14 Family Cruiser and PA-15 Vagabond. Piper introduced the Taxicub light charter concept at 1500 dealers and 52 distributors. In 1948, with two thirds of its workforce laid off, Piper only lost $75,000, but it found itself no longer the leader in a shrinking market, falling behind Cessna, which itself only delivered 1,600 aircraft; the Ponca City factory was closed. At the end of 1948, Piper bought the Stinson Aircraft Company for $3 million and Shriver left the company.

=== 1950s ===
The outbreak of the Korean War in 1950 helped to stimulate production at Piper, which again won large orders for military versions of the Cub. William Piper regained control of the company the same year, and the decision was made to develop a twin-engine aircraft. The company initially investigated producing the Baumann Brigadier, but later decided to develop a Stinson design, which became the PA-23 Apache. In its business planning following the war, it became clear the Lock Haven facility would not support larger manufacturing efforts, and in 1955 it acquired rights to property at the Vero Beach Municipal Airport. Vero Beach was initially used as a center for design work under Fred Weick, with the first aircraft developed there being Piper's first agricultural aircraft, the PA-25 Pawnee, announced in 1958 and entering production the following year at Lock Haven.

=== 1960s ===
In 1960, the line of Piper aircraft consisted of agricultural and two-passenger variants of the Super Cub, the Caribbean, Colt and Tri-Pacer, two versions of the PA-24 Comanche, the Pawnee, the Apache and its new larger derivative the Aztec. The following year, the PA-28 Cherokee was the first type to enter production at the new Vero Beach factory. The Cherokee replaced the Tri-Pacer and Colt, which ended their production runs in 1961 and 1964 respectively. By the later part of the decade, Vero Beach was building 7,000 Cherokees per year.

In 1963, Piper supported Betty Miller's successful attempt to be the first female pilot to fly solo across the Pacific Ocean, during which she delivered a twin-engine Piper aircraft from Oakland, California, USA to Brisbane, Queensland, Australia.

In September 1964, Piper flew the prototype of its new PA-31 Navajo cabin-class twin for the first time, after two-and-a-half years of development.

In 1969, the Piper family agreed to sell Piper Aircraft to the Bangor Punta Corporation, which started an eight-year court battle with the losing bidder, Chris-Craft Industries, culminating in a Supreme Court decision in 1977.

=== 1970s ===
Piper discussed a merger with Swearingen but the deal was not completed. The Lock Haven facility was nearly destroyed in 1972 when torrential rains from Hurricane Agnes caused the Susquehanna River to flood in June. The manufacturing plant was flooded to a depth of 16 feet (4.9 m), effectively destroying about 100 aircraft and causing an estimated $23 million in damage. Much of the tooling necessary for production of several designs, including the Aztec, Navajo, and Comanche, was also destroyed, and the Piper PA-31T Cheyenne program received a setback when the prototype was damaged just after the Federal Aviation Administration awarded it Type Certification. Initial deliveries of the new PA-31-350 Chieftain were also delayed by several months. After the flood, Piper gave 32 written-off PA-28s, PA-31s and PA-23 Aztecs to NASA, which used them for crash tests at the Langley Research Center, using a rig originally built to simulate spacecraft landings on the moon for the Apollo program.

As a result of the flood, and market factors, the company decided to end production of the Comanche and Twin Comanche. Piper opened a manufacturing division in Lakeland, Florida, in 1972 and through the 1970s, the Piper PA-31 Navajo, Chieftain, and Cheyenne III were manufactured at the more than 710,000-square-foot (66,000 m^{2}) facility on the Lakeland municipal airport.

In 1978, Piper purchased the Aerostar line of light piston twins from the Ted Smith Aerostar Corporation, designated the aircraft as the PA-60, and subsequently relocated the Aerostar production line from Santa Maria, California, to Vero Beach.

=== 1980s and 1990s ===
Piper opened its T1000 airline division at the Lakeland, Florida, location in May 1981, with 20 people. Employment at both of Piper's Lakeland divisions peaked at 2,200 later that year. The Piper PA-42 Cheyenne IV and the Piper T-1020/Piper T-1040 aircraft were manufactured in Lakeland during that time. Piper also maintained a fully staffed research and development center in Lakeland, including the "X" shop, which developed the Piper PA-48 Enforcer. The airline division provided aircraft for commuter airlines in the United States including Air New Orleans, Desert Sun in Long Beach, Shasta Air and Sun West Airlines, as well as internationally for Vickers for corporate transport use in the United Kingdom, Cameroon's Avia Services and to Piper's distributor in Colombia, Aero Leaver. In 1984, Piper changed hands when parent company Bangor Punta was acquired by Lear Siegler which, in turn, was acquired by Forstmann Little in 1986. Forstmann Little then sold Piper to M. Stuart Millar in 1987.

Manufacture of light aircraft was impacted in the mid-1980s when increasing product liability insurance premiums made operation financially difficult for Piper and other American manufacturers of light aircraft. In a bid to improve sales, Piper cut prices for its aircraft and the company became unprofitable. In 1991 the Lakeland, Florida factory was sold and closed and by July that year the workforce had shrunk to 45; with only $1,000 in available cash remaining, Piper filed for Chapter 11 bankruptcy after a proposed takeover by competing French manufacturer Socata failed over the issue of product liability. Production of the flagship Cheyenne 400 ended in February 1993 with only 43 being built since its inception a decade earlier. In 1995, the company emerged from Chapter 11 bankruptcy and was renamed New Piper Aircraft. As part of the end of bankruptcy protection, the company was sold to Newco Pac Inc., itself owned by Piper's creditors (including major creditor, aircraft engine manufacturer Teledyne Continental Motors) and a Philadelphia-based investment firm.

=== 2000s ===
In July 2003, American Capital Strategies, Ltd. bought 94% of Piper's voting equity.

In July 2006, a partnership with Honda was announced to market the new HA-420 HondaJet. The following month, the firm dropped the "New" from its name, reverting to Piper Aircraft.

In response to the late 2000s recession, the company announced in November 2008 that it was reducing its work-week to save money while avoiding lay-offs. Piper is party to an agreement with the state of Florida that will see the company benefit from $32 million in incentives in exchange for increasing its work force to 1400 people and building the PiperJet in the state.

In December 2008, the company announced it would defer the $10 million incentive that required hiring 400 new workers by 2012 for the PiperJet project and retain 1,417 employees through 2015. The company stated the move was precautionary. Piper spokesman Mark Miller said: "While this year has been a good one for Piper, we have taken measures to keep the company healthy and to weather any future adversity."

In February 2009, the company announced it was laying off an additional 300 workers without notice immediately and the 650 remaining workers would be given unpaid weeks off in April and July to reduce unsold inventory. Piper spokesman Mark Miller stated company regretted the pain caused by the layoffs and indicated the employees would be rehired when the economy improves. He also said: "Even the willing buyers that we have find it incredibly difficult to get financing...We can't keep a full workforce on at this point when people aren't buying planes...If market conditions continue to deteriorate, it may be necessary for the company to take additional actions". On 24 February 2009, the company announced it would add two more weeks of unpaid furlough for its employees in May and June, bringing the total to four weeks in 2009, citing a need to reduce inventory and cut expenses. In June 2010, the company announced it would shut down for a further week in August to save money. The lay-off affected all workers except those on the PiperJet program and some critical company business functions.

On 1 May 2009, American Capital Strategies sold the company to Singapore-based investment strategy company Imprimis, making a profit of US$31 million on the sale. Imprimis is funded by the Government of Brunei and has offices in Bangkok, Singapore and Brunei Darussalam.

In June 2009, James Bass, CEO of Piper Aircraft since 2005, announced he would step down effective that same month. He was succeeded by VP of operations Kevin Gould. During his four years at Piper, Bass oversaw development of the PiperJet, the Meridian G1000 and the Matrix, and negotiated a new business partnership with Honda. He also negotiated $32 million in incentives from the state and county that retained Piper's factory in Vero Beach, Florida.

On 2 November 2009, company president John Becker announced his resignation effective 1 December 2009 "to pursue other career opportunities". Becker was replaced as president by CEO Kevin Gould.

=== 2010s ===
On 4 January 2010, the company announced Boeing subsidiary Aviall would act as Piper's sole global parts distributor.

In July 2010, CEO Kevin Gould resigned for unspecified reasons, having served just over a year in the post. Gould was replaced on an interim basis by Geoffrey Berger, managing director of Imprimus in Brunei, on behalf of the government of Brunei. Also in July 2010, longtime Piper media spokesman Mark Miller left the company.

In September 2010, Piper announced the lay-off of an additional 60 production workers. Piper's interim CEO Geoffrey Berger stated: "Piper remains challenged by overall market weakness". The company hired 140 workers for the PiperJet program in 2009–10.

Piper started renovation of a 75,000 sq ft (7,000 m^{2}) factory in Vero Beach in October 2010, with a completion goal of 2011. The facility was intended to be used to build the PiperJet.

On 17 October 2011, the company announced Simon Caldecott had replaced Geoff Berger as interim CEO. At the same time, executive vice president Randy Groom also resigned from the company and it was announced that the Piper Altaire program was "under review". Only one week later, on 24 October 2011, Piper Aircraft announced it had "indefinitely suspended" all work on the Altaire project and would be laying off 150 of its 850 employees, plus 55 contract workers, due to the program's cancellation.

In December 2011, Piper announced it was attempting to renegotiate the 2008 deal it had made with the state of Florida and Indian River County for incentives. The company did not meet its contractual requirements to employ 1,100 people by the end of 2009; instead, employment fell to 600, and as a result, the company owed US$1.5 million. Piper is looking for forgiveness of the debt. Also in December, Piper came under the direct ownership of the government of Brunei.

In July 2015 the company announced it was laying off 15-20% of its workers, about 150 people, as sales were faltering amongst world markets, especially Asia, Latin America and Europe.

In February 2018, Piper announced the largest order of trainer aircraft in the company's history. Fanmei Aviation Technologies, which is Piper's exclusive dealer in China, placed an order for 152 aircraft. The deliveries will take place over a period of seven years.

In April 2019 an even bigger order was announced: L3 Commercial Aviation will take delivery up to 240 new aircraft over the next 10 years. The order will consist of single-engine Piper Archers and twin-engine Piper Seminoles.

=== 2020s ===
In March 2021, CEO Simon Caldecott announced that he would retire in April 2021. CFO John Calcagno assumed the role of president and CEO in April 2021.

In February 2024, Piper introduced a brand new aircraft, the M700 Fury. This aircraft had been secretly developed over the course of the past two years, and was a pleasant surprise to the aviation community.

In October 2024, the Piper M700 FURY, a high-performance single-engine aircraft by Piper Aircraft, received type certification from several aviation authorities: the European Union Aviation Safety Agency (EASA), Brazil’s Agência Nacional de Aviação Civil (ANAC), and the Civil Aviation Safety Authority (CASA) of Australia. The certification encompasses flight approvals in known icing conditions and for operation on unpaved surfaces, enhancing the M700 FURY’s operational versatility. Deliveries for customers in Europe, Brazil, and Australia are set to begin by the end of October 2024, following this milestone certification.

== Aircraft ==
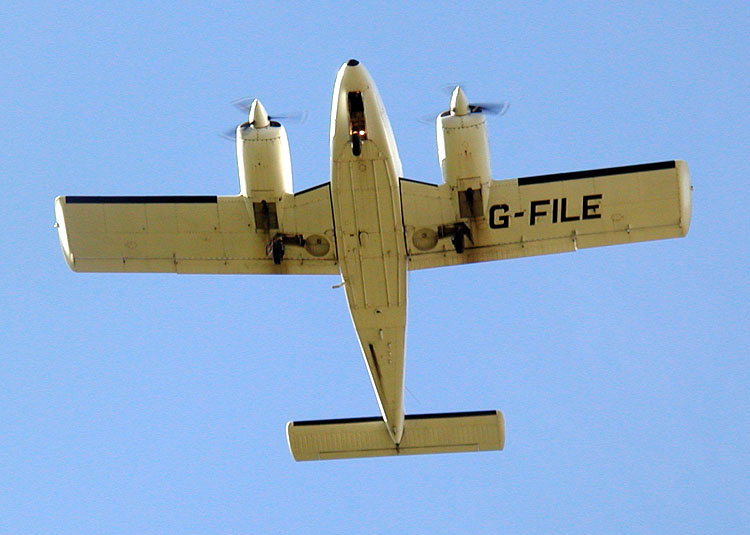
PA-34 Seneca

Piper's J-3 Cub, a single-engine, high-wing, two-seater, was the first inexpensive training aircraft produced in large numbers. Many former military examples were sold to civilian owners over the 1950-1995 period and seem certain to see many more years in recreational use.

The PA-28 Cherokee has been one of the company's most successful products. Both this design and the twin-engined PA-34 Seneca are used for pilot training around the world. The PA-23 Apache was one of the first aircraft associated with the term "air taxi", although it was superseded in that role by faster and more spacious designs from competitors Beechcraft and Cessna.

Beginning production in 1965, the PA-32 series provided six- or seven-seat, single-engine designs based on the smaller Cherokee. Variously named Cherokee Six, Lance, and Saratoga, these were available as both fixed- and retractable-gear models and also with normally aspirated, fuel-injected, and turbocharged engines. The PA-32s proved popular with private owners, air taxi, and freight companies. Production of the Saratoga-II HPs and Saratoga TCs ended in 2009.

On 21 January 2010 the company announced it had licensed the CZAW SportCruiser and intended to market it as the PiperSport. Piper CEO Kevin Gould said, "The PiperSport is an amazing entry-level aircraft that will bring new customers into Piper and lead the way for those customers to step up into more sophisticated and higher performance aircraft within our line over time." In January 2011, the licensing agreement with Piper was abruptly ended with Piper CEO Geoffrey Berger saying "the company has a different business perspective and approach to the market than Czech Sport Aircraft".

== See also ==
- Piper Aircraft Co. v. Reyno, a 1981 case involving the company decided by the US Supreme Court in which the court considered the lower court's application of its power of forum non conveniens
- Emergency autoland, a system developed by Garmin which was first certified on the Piper M600 in May 2020 and is branded by Piper as the "HALO Safety System"
