= List of Piper models =

The following is a list of Piper aircraft models:

== Models ==
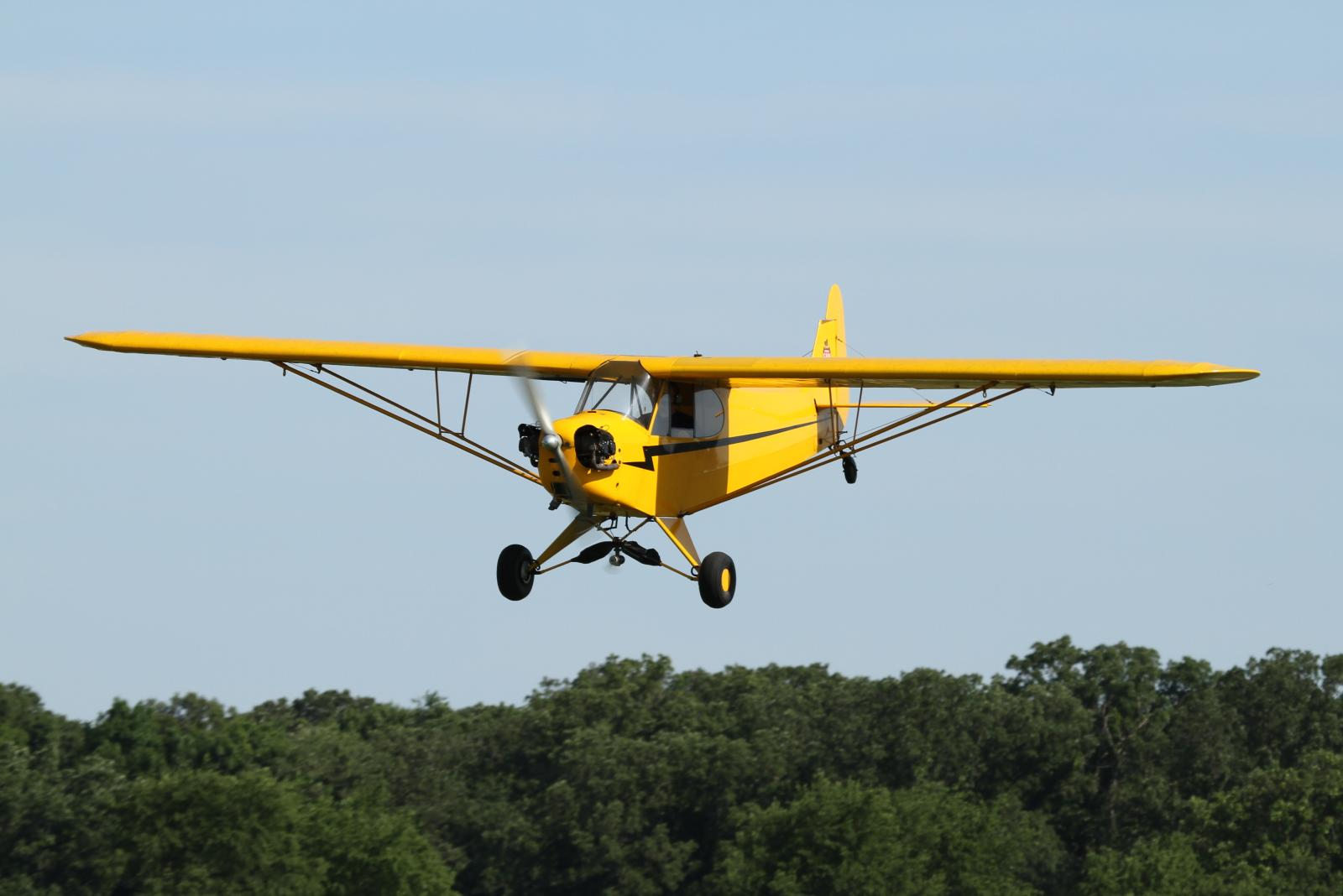
Piper J-3 Cub

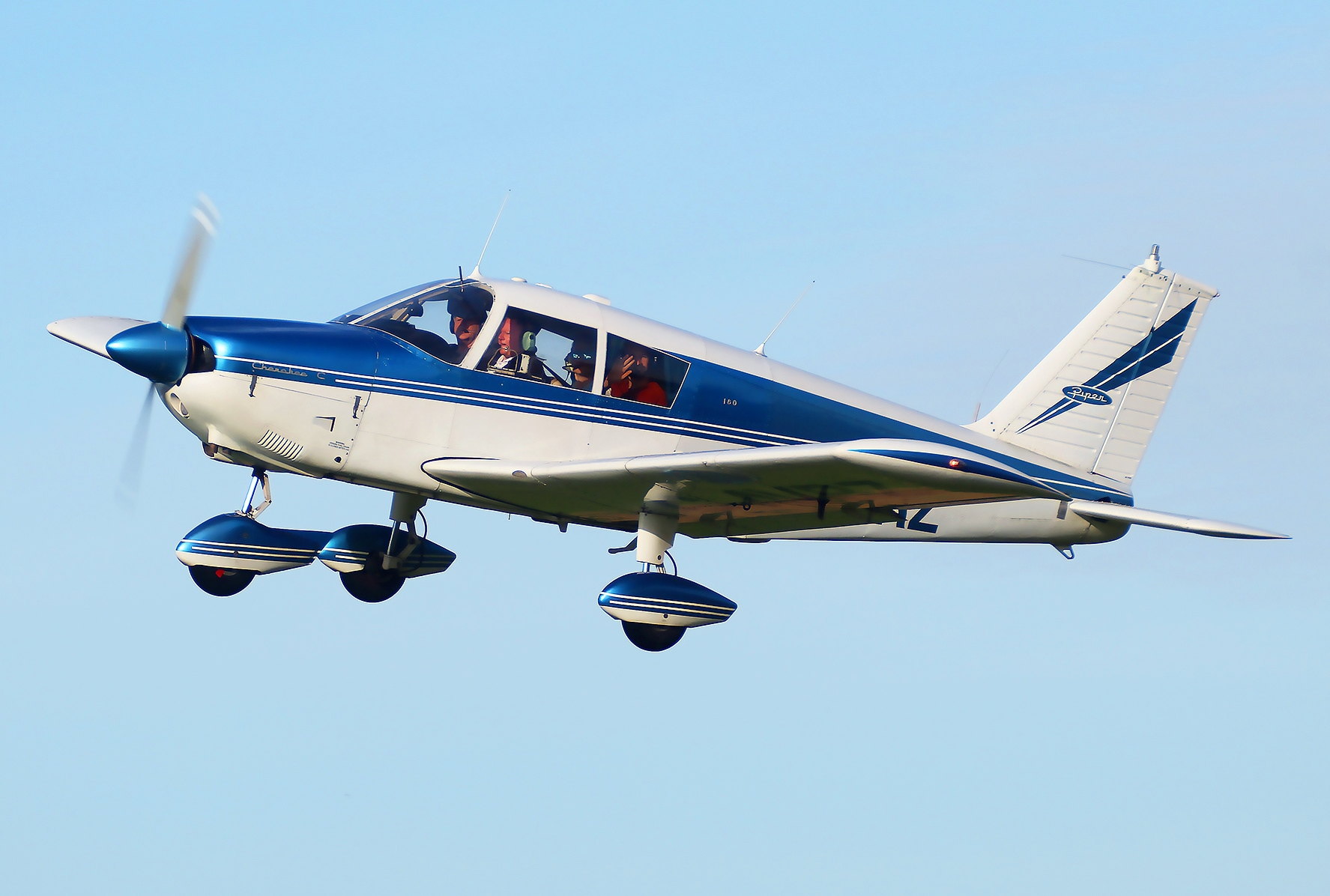
Piper PA-28-180 Cherokee C

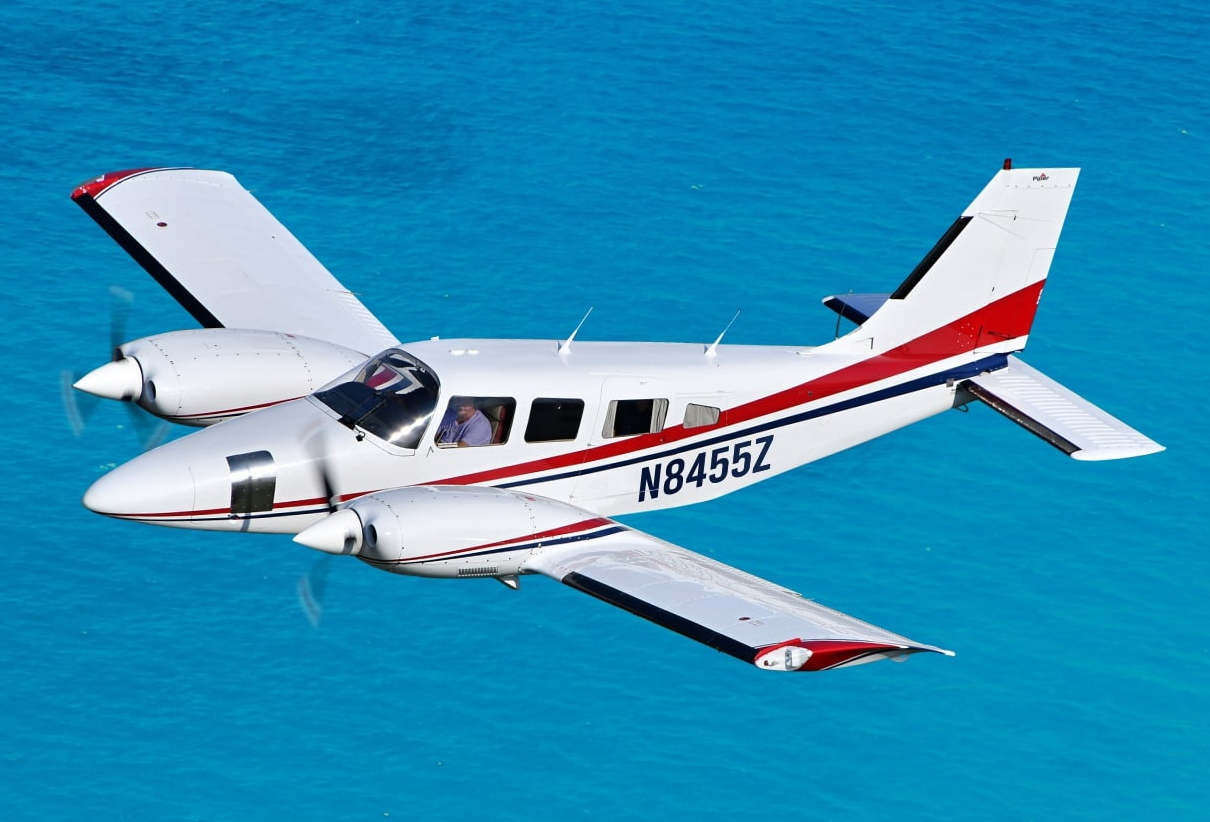
Piper PA-34-220T Seneca

Model name	First flight	Number built	Type
J-2 Cub	1936	1,207	Single-engined high-wing cabin monoplane
J-3 Cub	1938	19,888	Single-engined high-wing cabin monoplane
J-4 Cub Coupe	1939	1,251	Single-engined high-wing cabin monoplane
J-5 Cub Cruiser	1940	1,507	Single-engined high-wing cabin monoplane
P-1 Applegate Duck	1940	1	Amphibian
P-2 Cub	1941	1	Single-engined high-wing cabin monoplane
P-3		1	Single-engined high-wing cabin monoplane, also known as J-4RX
P-4 Cub	1941	1	Single-engined high-wing cabin monoplane
P-5	1944	1	Single-engined high-wing cabin monoplane, also known as J-3X
PT-1 Trainer	1942	1	Two-seats in tandem, low-wing monoplane
PWA-1 Skycoupe	1943	1	Two-seat low wing twin-boom monoplane, later became PA-7
PWA-8 Cub Cycle	1944	1	Single-seat, mid-wing single-engine monoplane
LBP	1945	3	Single-seat, optionally-piloted glider bomb
PA-6 Sky Sedan	1945	2	Four-seat, low-wing retractable gear monoplane
PA-7 Skycoupe	1944	1	Two-seat low wing twin-boom monoplane, was PWA-1,
PA-8 Skycycle	1945	2	Single-seat, mid-wing single-engine monoplane
PA-9		0	Single-engined high-wing observation and liaison design
PA-10		0	Single-engined low-wing side-by-side two-seater design
PA-11 Cub Special	1947	1,541	Single-engined high-wing cabin monoplane
PA-12 Super Cruiser	1946	3,760	Single-engined high-wing cabin monoplane
PA-13	-	-	Designation not used
PA-14 Family Cruiser	1948	238	Single-engined high-wing cabin monoplane
PA-15 Vagabond	1948	388	Side-by-side two-seat high-wing monoplane
PA-16 Clipper	1949	736	Four-seat version of the PA-15
PA-17 Vagabond	1948	214	Dual-control variant of the PA-15
PA-18 Super Cub	1950	10,326	Single-engined high-wing cabin monoplane
PA-19 Super Cub	1949	3	Initial designation for military version of the PA-18, reverted to PA-18 designation after three built
PA-20 Pacer	1950	1,120	Re-designed PA-16
PA-21		0	Proposed production version of the Baumann Brigadier
PA-22 Tri-Pacer	1951	9,490	Updated version of the PA-20 with nose wheel
PA-23 Apache	1954	2,165	Twin-engined low-wing cabin monoplane
PA-24 Comanche	1958	4,857	Single-engine four-seat low-wing cabin monoplane
PA-24-400 Comanche	1964	148	Re-engined PA-24 development
PA-25 Pawnee	1959	5,167	Single-engined agricultural monoplane
PA-26		0	Proposed higher-power version of the PA-24
PA-27 Aztec	1960	4,930	Improved version of the PA-23, kept PA-23 designation
PA-28 Cherokee	1961	10,896	Single-engined low-wing cabin monoplane
PA-28-140 Cherokee	1964	10,089	Two-seat training variant
PA-28 Warrior	1974	4,842	Improved PA-28
PA-28-235 Cherokee/Dakota	1964	2,913	Higher-power PA-28
PA-28R Arrow	1967	6,694	Retractable landing gear variant of the PA-28
PA-28R-300 Pillán	1982	2 (Note: An additional 120 kits were delivered to Chile and Spain for final assembly.)	Two-seat military trainer designed for ENAER of Chile
PA-29 Papoose	1962	1	Small trainer of fiberglass construction
PA-30 Twin Comanche	1963	2,001	Four-seat twin-engined low wing cabin monoplane
PA-31 Navajo	1967	1,785	Eight-seat twin-engined low wing cabin monoplane
PA-31-350 Chieftain	1973	1,825	Stretched Navajo
PA-31P Pressurized Navajo	1970	259	Pressurized version of Navajo with more powerful engines
PA-31P-350 Mojave	1983	~50	Lower-power successor to Pressurized Navajo, piston-engine Cheyenne/Chieftain hybrid
PA-31T Cheyenne	1974	823	Turboprop powered derivative of Pressurized Navajo
PA-32 Cherokee Six	1966	4,373	Six-seat Cherokee derivative with wider cabin
PA-32R Lance/Saratoga	1976	2,721	Retractable landing gear variant of the PA-32
PA-33 Comanche	1966	1	Pressurized Comanche
PA-34 Seneca	1972	5,037	Twin-engine derivative of PA-32R
PA-35 Pocono	1968	1	Twin-engined pressurized commuter airliner
PA-36 Pawnee Brave	1973	938	Single-engined agricultural monoplane
PA-37		0	Proposed twin-engined PA-33
PA-38 Tomahawk	1978	2,484	Two-seat basic trainer
PA-39 Twin Comanche C/R	1970	155	Improved PA-30 with counter-rotating propellers
PA-40 Arapaho	1973	3 (Note: 5 additional aircraft were not completed.)	PA-39 replacement
PA-41P	1974	1	Pressurized Aztec
Piper PA-42 Cheyenne	1979	192	T-tail derivative of PA-31T Cheyenne
PA-43		0	Proposed piston-engined PA-42
PA-44 Seminole	1976	926	Twin-engined derivative of PA-28R
PA-45		0	Proposed six-seat T-tailed aircraft family
PA-46 Malibu/Malibu Mirage	1979	1,250	Six-seat pressurized single; production of 310P and 350P from 1983 thru 2014
PA-46 Matrix	2008	215	Six-seat non-pressurized version of the PA-46 Malibu; introduced as a 2008 model
PA-47 Piperjet	2008	1	seating for 6 or 7 based on configuration
PA-48 Enforcer	1971	4	Single-seat counter-insurgency aircraft based on the Cavalier Mustang/North American P-51 Mustang
PA-60 Aerostar	1967	1,010	Six-seat pressurized twin, Piper purchased the design from Ted R. Smith
PA-61 Aerostar	1967		Six-seat pressurized twin
PiperSport	2010	85	Two-seat light-sport aircraft marketed by Piper between January 2010 and January 2011. It was produced by Czech Sport Aircraft and previously known as the SportCruiser
Piper M350	2015	69	Six-seat pressurized piston single; formerly named Malibu Mirage; only M350 production listed
Piper M500/Malibu Meridian	2000	624	Six-seat pressurized turboprop single; formerly named Mailbu Meridian; M500 and Meridian production listed
Piper M600	2016	57	Six-seat pressurized turboprop single
Piper M700 Fury	2024		Six-seat pressurized turboprop single
