= HZL =

HZL may refer to:

- Croatian Air Force Legion (Croatian: Hrvatska Zrakoplovna Legija), active during the Second World War
- Hazleton Municipal Airport, in Pennsylvania, United States
- Hindustan Zinc Limited, an Indian mining company
