= PA7 =

PA7 may refer to:

- Pennsylvania Route 7
- Pennsylvania's 7th congressional district
- Piper PA-7, a light aircraft of the 1940s
- Pitcairn PA-7 Super Mailwing, a biplane of the 1920s
