= Air Pennsylvania =

- Commenced operations: 1976; 49 years ago
- Ceased operations: 1982; 43 years ago
- Destinations: See Destinations below
- Headquarters: Reading, Pennsylvania, United States
- Key people: Eugene F. Plum II

Air Pennsylvania was a commuter airline active from 1976 to 1982 and based in Reading, Pennsylvania. It was owned by Eugene F. Plum II, whose family also operated a flight school and other airlines as Perkiomen Airways based in Reading, Pennsylvania and Sun International Airways in Puerto Rico.

== Fleet ==
- Beech 18
- Britten Norman Islander
- Cessna 152
- Cessna 172
- Cessna 182
- Convair 240
- DC-3 (N2VM)
- Fairchild Hiller FH-227
- Piper Apache
- Piper Arrow
- Piper Navajo
- Piper Trainer

== Destinations ==
- New Jersey
  - Atlantic City (Atlantic City International Airport)
- Pennsylvania
  - Allentown/Bethlehem/Easton (Lehigh Valley International Airport)
  - Hazleton (Hazleton Municipal Airport)*
  - Philadelphia (Philadelphia International Airport)
  - Reading (Reading Regional Airport)*
  - Cumberland Regional Airport (Cumberland, Maryland)*
  - Pittsburgh, Pennsylvania (Greater Pittsburgh International Airport)**

Those airports marked with an asterisk (*) are no longer served by commercial air service. Greater Pittsburgh International Airport was replaced by Pittsburgh International Airport, which is commercially serviced.

== See also ==
- List of defunct airlines of the United States
