= Aeronca Arrow =

Type of aircraft

General information
- National origin: United States of America
- Manufacturer: Aeronca

History
- Introduction date: 1947

The Aeronca Model 9 Arrow was a low-wing all-metal cabin monoplane with retractable landing gear. It was marketed to returning pilots from World War II and unveiled in 1947 but never went into production.

The single prototype (registered NX39581) was destroyed in a crash during a test flight due to propeller failure.

== Specifications ==
Data from Jane's all the World's Aircraft 1947

General characteristics

- Crew: 2
- Length: 19 ft 9 in (6.02 m)
- Wingspan: 30 ft (9.1 m)
- Wing area: 137 sq ft (12.7 m^{2})
- Aspect ratio: 6.57
- Empty weight: 850 lb (386 kg)
- Gross weight: 1,450 lb (658 kg)
- Fuel capacity: 25 US gal (21 imp gal; 95 L)
- Powerplant: 1 × Franklin 4AC 4-cyl. horizontally-opposed air-cooled piston engine, 90 hp (67 kW)
- Propellers: 2-bladed wooden fixed pitch propeller

Performance

- Maximum speed: 135 mph (217 km/h, 117 kn)
- Cruise speed: 125 mph (201 km/h, 109 kn)
- Landing speed (flaps): 48 mph (42 kn; 77 km/h)
- Landing speed (no flaps): 54 mph (47 kn; 87 km/h)
- Range: 310 mi (500 km, 270 nmi)
- Rate of climb: 550 ft/min (2.8 m/s)
- Wing loading: 2.2 lb/sq ft (10.6 kg/m^{2})
- Power/mass: 15.9 lb/hp (9.65 kg/kW)

== Development ==
The Arrow's single prototype, registered NX39581, was an experimental aircraft that Aeronca photographed under development alongside a Model 7 Champion and a Tandem trainer. A typewritten note on the back of a photograph in the William F. Yeager Aviation Collection at Wright State University describes it as a "sleek new low-wing" experimental plane and praises its visibility.

The Arrow was Aeronca's first and only aircraft with retractable landing gear. It was powered by a 90 hp Franklin four-cylinder engine and was equipped with a generator and starter, and the only example built was destroyed during a demonstration flight after its propeller failed.

== See also ==
Aircraft of comparable role, configuration, and era

- Culver Cadet
- Globe GC-1 Swift
- Johnson Rocket 185
- Piper PT-1
