= Piper PA-6 =

PA-6 Sky Sedan

General information
- Type: Light aircraft
- Manufacturer: Piper Aircraft
- Number built: Two

History
- First flight: 1944

The Piper PA-6 Sky Sedan was a 1940s American four-seat light aircraft designed and built in prototype form by Piper Aircraft at its Lock Haven, Pennsylvania, factory.

== History ==
Towards the end of 1944 Piper announced a number of aircraft types it intended to build after World War II. One of these was the PWA-6 Sky Sedan (Post War Airplane 6). A prototype was built in 1945 as a development of Piper's unsuccessful two-seat PT-1 trainer. Its fuselage had a fabric-covered metal frame with a four-seat cabin. It was a low-wing cantilever monoplane with a conventional tail unit and a retractable tailwheel landing gear. Originally to be powered by a 140 hp Franklin engine, it had a 165 hp Continental E-165 engine. By the time it first flew the designation had been changed to PA-6. A second aircraft was built in 1947, it differed by having an all-metal construction, a 205 hp Continental E-185 engine and a one-piece windscreen. Neither version was placed into production at a time when a short boom in postwar general aviation was ending.

== Specifications (PA-6) ==
Data from Jane's all the World's Aircraft 1947

General characteristics

- Crew: 1
- Capacity: 3 pax
- Length: 26 ft 0 in (7.93 m)
- Wingspan: 34 ft 8 in (10.56 m)
- Height: 7 ft 0 in (2.13 m)
- Airfoil: Modified USA 35B
- Empty weight: 1,360 lb (617 kg)
- Gross weight: 2,400 lb (1,089 kg)
- Fuel capacity: 40 US gal (33 imp gal; 150 L) fuel; 2.5 US gal (2.1 imp gal; 9.5 L) oil
- Powerplant: 1 × Continental E165 6-cyl. horizontally-opposed air-cooled piston engine, 165 hp (123 kW)
- Propellers: 2-bladed Sensenich fixed pitch propeller

Performance

- Maximum speed: 160 mph (260 km/h, 140 kn)
- Cruise speed: 150 mph (240 km/h, 130 kn) at 125 hp (93 kW) and 140 mph (120 kn; 230 km/h) at 100 hp (75 kW) at sea level
- Economic cruising speed: 120 mph (100 kn; 190 km/h) at 40% power
- Landing speed: 49 mph (43 kn; 79 km/h) with flaps; 55 mph (48 kn; 89 km/h) without flaps
- Range: 620 mi (1,000 km, 540 nmi) at 140 mph (120 kn; 230 km/h)
- Fuel consumption: 1.664 lb/mi (0.469 kg/km)

== See also ==
Aircraft of comparable role, configuration, and era

- Globe Swift
