= Piper PA-24 Comanche =

American four- or six-seat monoplane built 1956–1972

PA-24 Comanche
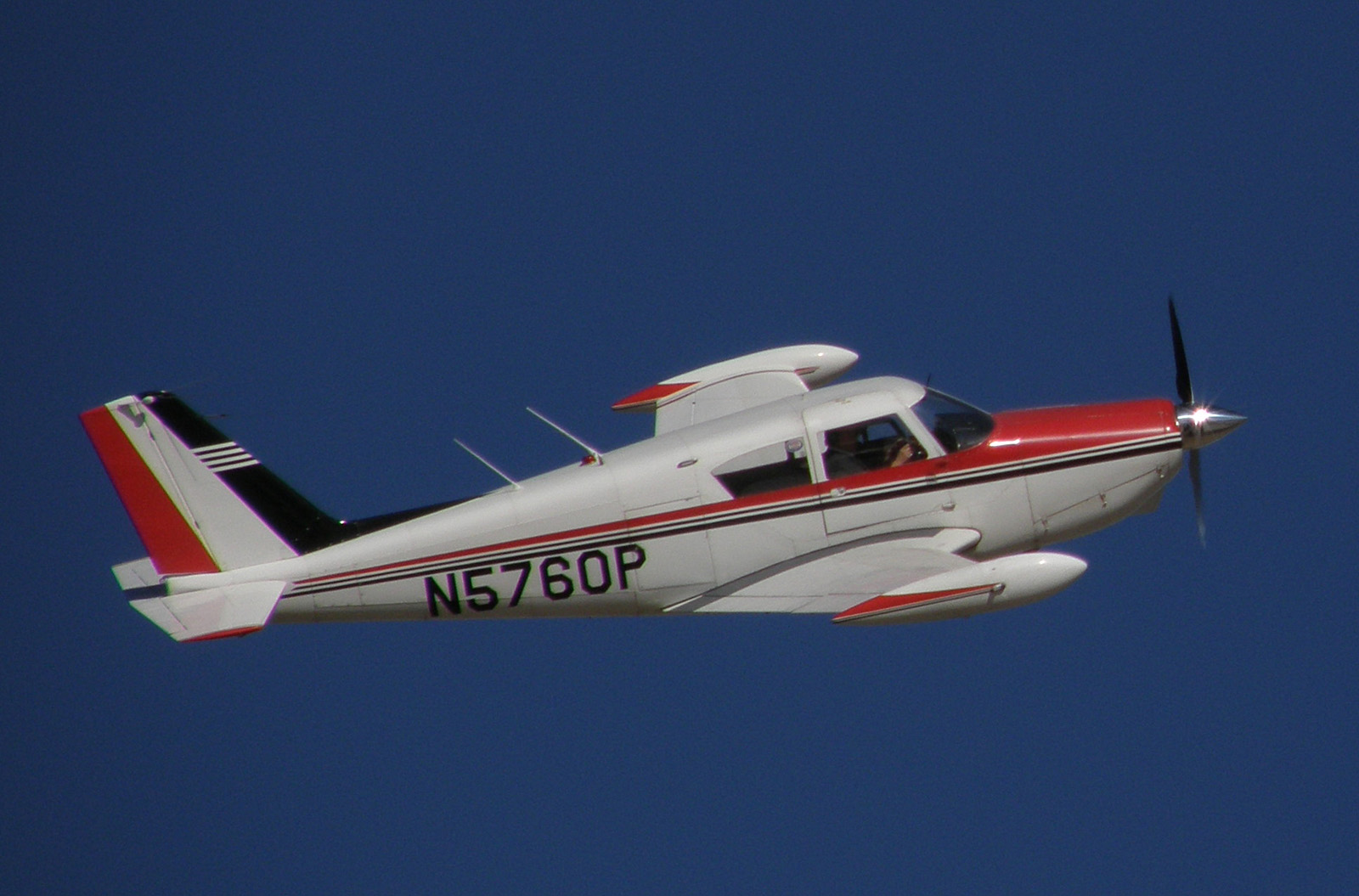
- PA-24-250

General information
- Type: Civil utility aircraft
- National origin: United States
- Manufacturer: Piper Aircraft
- Primary users: Private aviators Flight schools
- Number built: 4,857

History
- Manufactured: 1957-1972
- Introduction date: 1958
- First flight: May 24, 1956
- Developed into: Piper PA-30 Twin Comanche; Piper PA-39 Twin Comanche; Ravin 500

The Piper PA-24 Comanche is an American single-engine, low-wing, all-metal monoplane of semimonocoque construction with tricycle retractable landing gear and four or six seats. The Comanche was designed and built by Piper Aircraft and first flew on May 24, 1956. Together with the PA-30 and PA-39 Twin Comanches, it made up the core of Piper's lineup until 1972, when the production lines for both aircraft were destroyed in the 1972 Lock Haven flood.

== Design and development ==
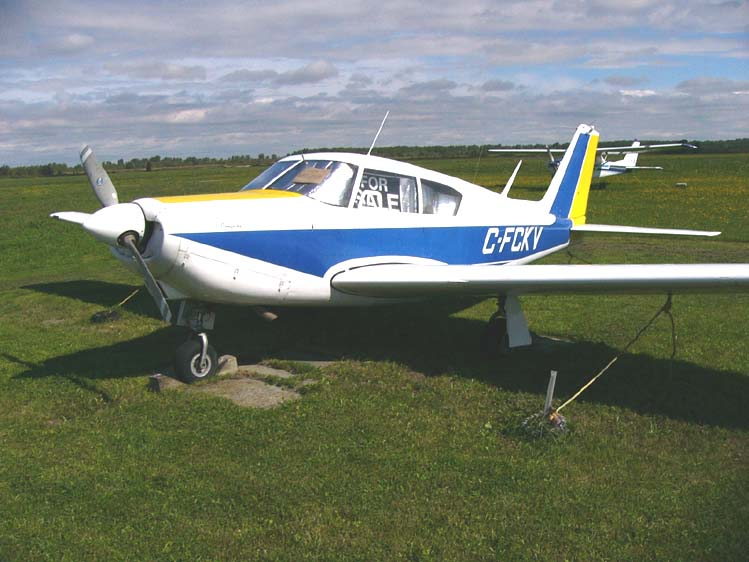
A 1959 model PA-24

Two prototypes were built in 1956, with the first being completed by June 20, 1956. The first production aircraft, powered by a 180 hp (134 kW) Lycoming O-360-A1A engine, first flew on October 21, 1957. In 1958, it was joined by a higher-powered PA-24-250 with a 250 hp (186 kW) Lycoming O-540-A1A5 engine; this model was originally to be known as the PA-26, but Piper decided to keep the PA-24 designation.

In 1964, the 400 hp (298 kW) PA-24-400 was introduced. The following year, the PA-24-250 was superseded by the PA-24-260, featuring the Lycoming IO-540D or E engine of 260 hp (194 kW). A turbocharged version using a Rajay turbocharger was introduced in 1970.

Production of the Comanche ended in 1972, when torrential rains from Hurricane Agnes caused the great Susquehanna River flood of 1972, flooding the manufacturing plant and destroying airframes, parts, and much of the tooling necessary for production. Rather than rebuild the tooling, Piper chose to abandon production of the Comanche and Twin Comanche and continue with two newer designs already in production at Piper's other plant in Vero Beach, Florida - the PA-28R-200 Arrow and the twin-engined PA-34 Seneca.

== Variants ==
=== Comanche 180 ===
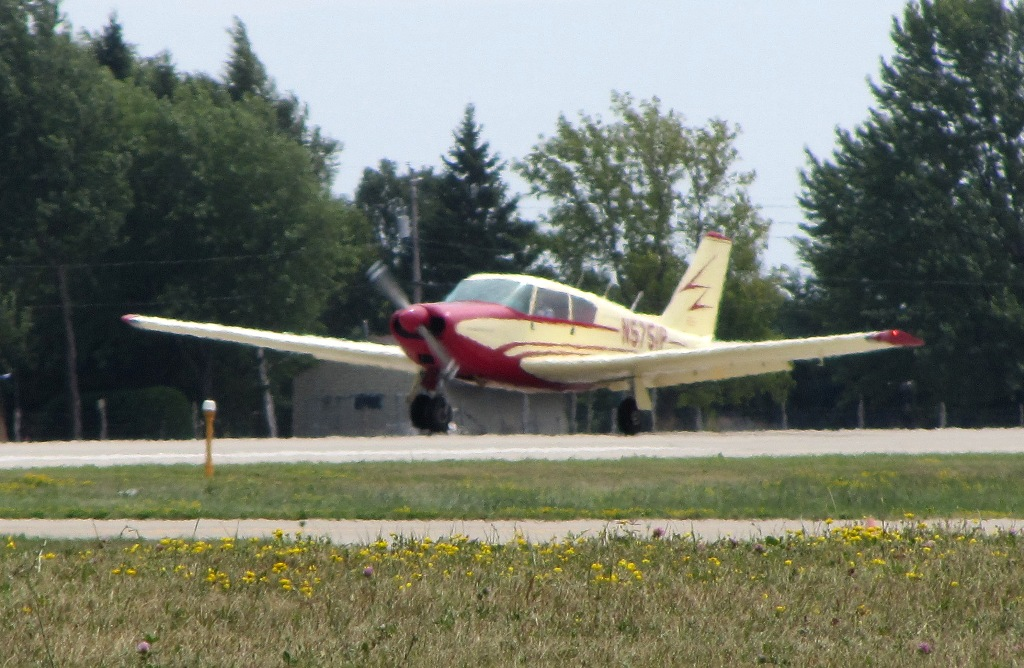
1959 Piper PA-24 180

The original version of the Comanche was the PA-24-180, which featured a carbureted 180 hp (134 kW) Lycoming O-360-A1A engine, swept tail, laminar flow airfoil, and all-flying stabilator.

The standard fuel capacity of the PA-24-180 was 60 US gallons (230 L). The flaps were manually actuated, controlled by the same Johnson bar actuator as the Piper Cherokee. The aircraft specifications were for cruise speeds of 116 to 139 knots (215 to 257 km/h) and fuel burns between 7.5 and 10.5 gallons per hour (28 and 40 L/h) at 55 and 75% power settings, respectively. Full-fuel payload with standard fuel was 715 lb (324 kg), with a gross weight of 2,550 lb (1,160 kg) and range with 45-minute reserve of 700 nmi (1,300 km; 810 mi).

When new, standard, typically equipped Comanche 180s sold between $17,850 (1958) and $21,580 (1964). A total of 1,143 were built.

=== Comanche 250 ===
In 1958, Piper introduced a 250 hp (190 kW) version using a Lycoming O-540 engine, giving the PA-24-250 Comanche a top cruise speed of 160 kn (180 mph; 300 km/h). Most 250s had carbureted Lycoming O-540-AIA5 engines, but a small number were fitted out with fuel-injected versions of the same engine. Early Comanche 250s had manually operated flaps and carried 60 US gal (230 L) of fuel. Auxiliary fuel tanks (90 US gal (340 L) total) became available in 1961. Electrically actuated flaps were made standard with the 1962 model year.

The PA-24-250 was the most numerous of the single Comanches; 2,537 were built.

=== Comanche 260 ===
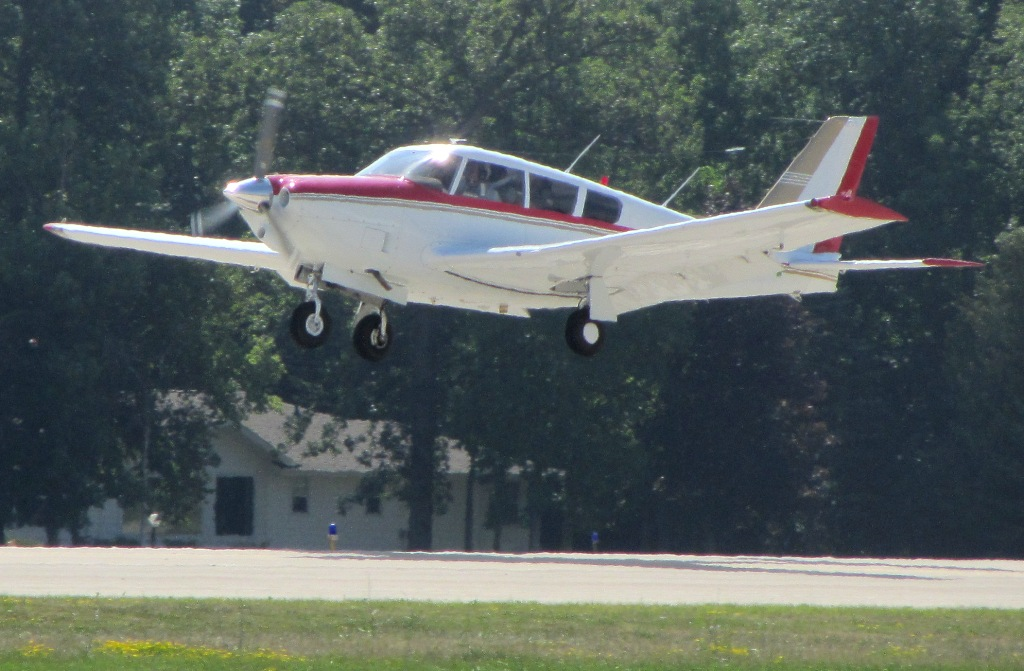
PA-24-260 with LoPresti cowling on landing

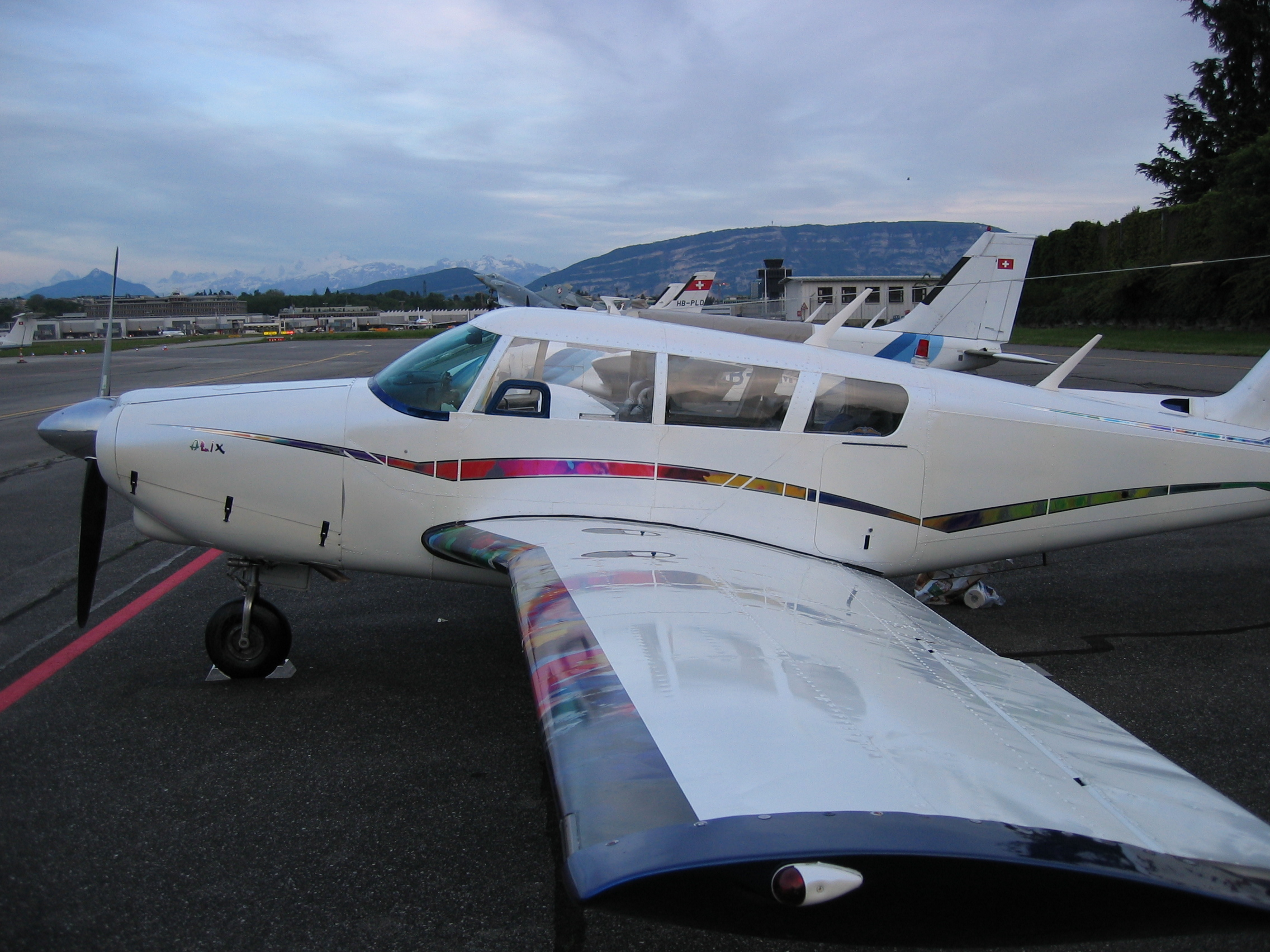
PA-24-260B with custom paint

Four 260-horsepower (194 kW) versions of the Comanche were introduced beginning in 1965. They were:

- PA-24-260 (1965)
- PA-24-260B (1966 to 1968)
- PA-24-260C (1969 to 1972)
- PA-24-260TC (Turbocharged 260C) (1970 to 1972)

A total of 1,029 airplanes were sold from the Comanche 260 line, including the 260TC.

The 260 had an empty weight around 1,700 lb (770 kg) and a maximum gross weight of 2,900 lb (1,300 kg). It had four seats, and a 90-US-gallon (340 L)-capacity auxiliary fuel system was available as an option. Cruise speed was advertised as 142–161 kn (263–298 km/h; 163–185 mph) with fuel burn of 10 to 14 gal/h (38 to 53 L/h).

The 260B had a third side window and a provision for six seats. The removable fifth and sixth seats snap into the baggage area. They take up the entire baggage area, and due to the placarded maximum weight of the baggage area of 250 lb (110 kg) (235 lb maximum combined weight for the two passengers), can seat children or smaller adults. Typical empty weight was 1,728 lb (784 kg) and gross weight was 3,100 lb (1,400 kg). Fuel burn was 11 to 14 gal/h (42 to 53 L/h) and advertised speed was 140–160 kn (260–300 km/h; 160–180 mph).

The 260C introduced a new "Tiger Shark" cowling, maximum gross weight of 3,200 lb (1,500 kg), cowl flaps, and an aileron-rudder interconnect. Cruise speed was advertised as 150–161 kn (278–298 km/h; 173–185 mph) with fuel flow of 12.5 to 14.1 gal/h (47 to 53 L/h). To prevent possible aft center-of-gravity problems due to the increased gross weight and its fifth and sixth seats, the propeller shaft was extended. The longer propeller shaft increased the overall length 6 in (150 mm) compared to previous models, and moved the center of gravity slightly forward. With a useful load of 1,427 lb (647 kg), the 260C has the largest payload of all of the Comanches except the 400. Often mistaken on the ramp for the 400 model, the slightly longer cowling includes a distinctively longer nose gear door, as compared to other PA-24 versions.

Starting in 1970, Piper offered a turbo-normalized variant of the PA-24-260 known as the 260TC with a Lycoming IO-540-R1A5 engine and dual Rajay turbochargers. Twenty-six were produced between 1970 and 1972. Advertised by Piper as a "second throttle", the turbochargers are controlled using a manual wastegate assembly that places an additional handle labeled "boost" next to the throttle handle in the cockpit, effectively creating a secondary throttle. The TC model is certified for flight to 25,000 ft (7,600 m), with an advertised turbo critical altitude of 20,000 ft (6,100 m), giving a maximum true airspeed of 223 mph (194 kn; 359 km/h).

=== PA-24-300 ===
In 1967, one aircraft was modified with a 300 hp (224 kW) Lycoming engine for trials. It did not enter production.

=== PA-24-380 ===
Two prototype aircraft were built in 1961. They were standard Comanche airframes, but had 380 hp (283 kW) Lycoming IO-720-A1A engines with a three-bladed propeller. The design was modified with an even larger 400 hp (298 kW) engine and produced as the PA-24-400.

=== Comanche 400 ===
The PA-24-400 Comanche 400 was produced from 1964 to 1966. Only 148 PA-24-400s were built.

The Comanche 400 is powered by the 400 hp (298 kW), horizontally opposed, eight-cylinder Lycoming IO-720 engine, developed specifically for the model. Cooling problems have happened with the rear cylinders.

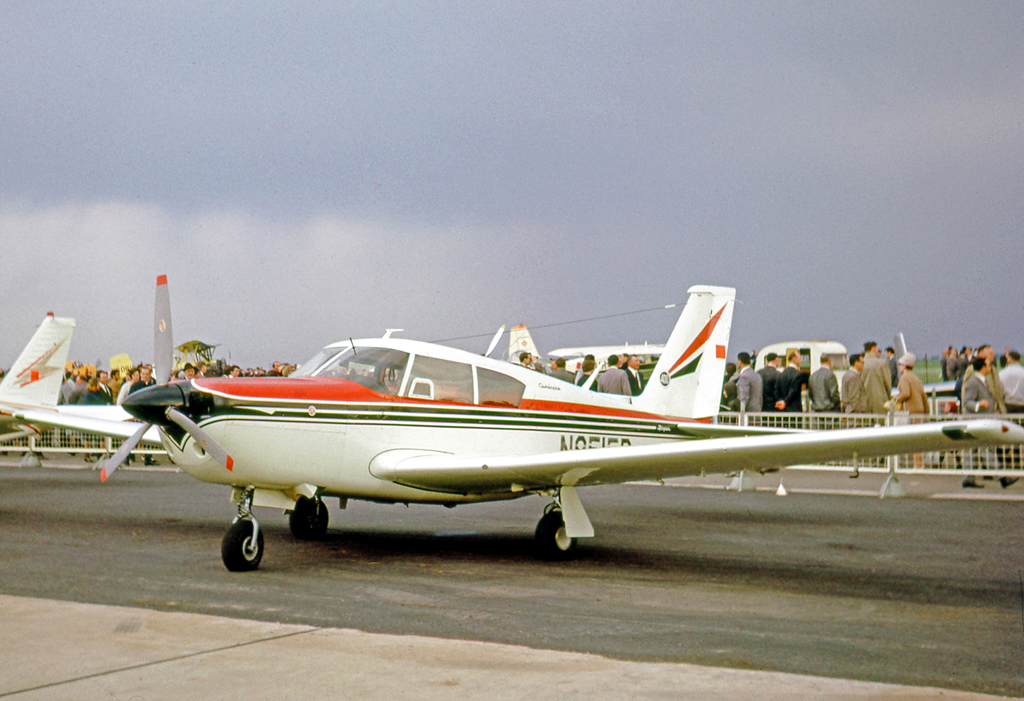
Comanche 400, MSN 26-52, exhibited at the 1966 Hannover Air Show, Germany

The Comanche 400 has a three-bladed propeller and carries 100 US gal (380 L) of fuel, or 130 US gal (490 L) with optional extended tanks. Fuel burn was advertised as 16 to 23 gal/h (61 to 87 L/h), at 55-75% power. The high fuel burn means that it is expensive to operate. The 400 had a typical empty weight of 2,110 lb (960 kg) and a maximum gross weight of 3,600 lb (1,600 kg).

Book speeds for the PA-24-400 included a cruising speed of 185 kn (343 km/h; 213 mph) and a top speed of 194 kn (359 km/h; 223 mph).

While identical in planform to other PA-24 models, the 400 is structurally strengthened, primarily in the tail, with an extra nose rib in the stabilator and the vertical fin. The stabilator, vertical fin, and rudder of the 400 share virtually no common parts with the 180, 250, or 260 hp (190 kW) Comanches.

=== PA-33 ===
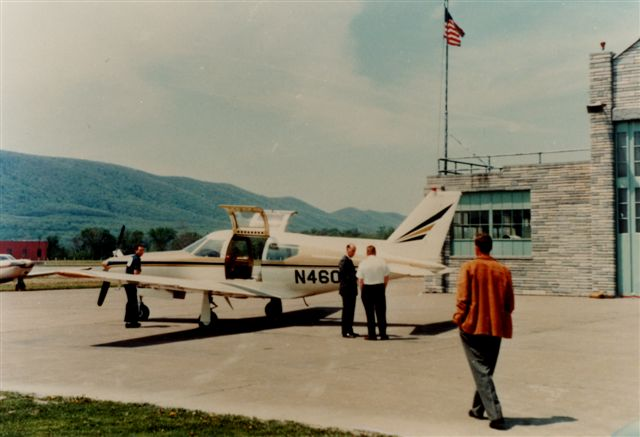
The PA-33 Pressurized Comanche prototype

In 1967, a single Comanche was modified by Swearingen with a pressurized cabin. The prototype, powered by a 260 hp (190 kW) Lycoming O-540 engine and equipped with Twin Comanche landing gear, was designated the PA-33. First flown on March 11, 1967, the prototype later crashed on takeoff in May 1967 and the project was cancelled.

== World records ==
=== Max Conrad ===
In June 1959, Max Conrad flew a Comanche 250 on a record-breaking distance flight in Fédération Aéronautique Internationale C1-D Class, for aircraft from 3,858 lb (1,750 kg) to less than 6,614 lb (3,000 kg). Having removed the interior seats and replaced them with fuel tanks, Conrad flew nonstop from Casablanca, Morocco, to Los Angeles, a distance of 7,668 mi (12,340 km). When the aircraft took off from Casablanca, it was heavily overloaded and just cleared the airport fence. The Comanche 250 Max Conrad flew for this flight is now located in the museum at the Liberal, Kansas, airport.

On November 24–26, 1959, Conrad flew a Comanche 180 on a distance record flight in FAI C1-C Class for aircraft taking off at weights from 2,204 lb (1,000 kg) to less than 3,858 lb (1,750 kg) that still stands: Casablanca to El Paso, Texas, 6,966 mi (11,211 km) nonstop, a distance of 6,967 mi (6,054 nmi; 11,212 km), in 56 hours 26 minutes. He set a closed-circuit distance record in the same aircraft on July 4–6 November 1960, flying 6,921 mi (6,014 nmi; 11,138 km).

=== Kenneth Walker ===
On 14 May 1962, Kenneth Walker arrived in Brisbane, Australia, in a PA-24-250 on a delivery flight from San Francisco. Walker's flight was the first ever solo single-engine crossing of the Pacific, and the third solo crossing from the US to Australia. From Brisbane, Walker continued south to deliver the Comanche to the Royal Newcastle Aero Club at Maitland, New South Wales, Australia.

=== Toku-Hana ===
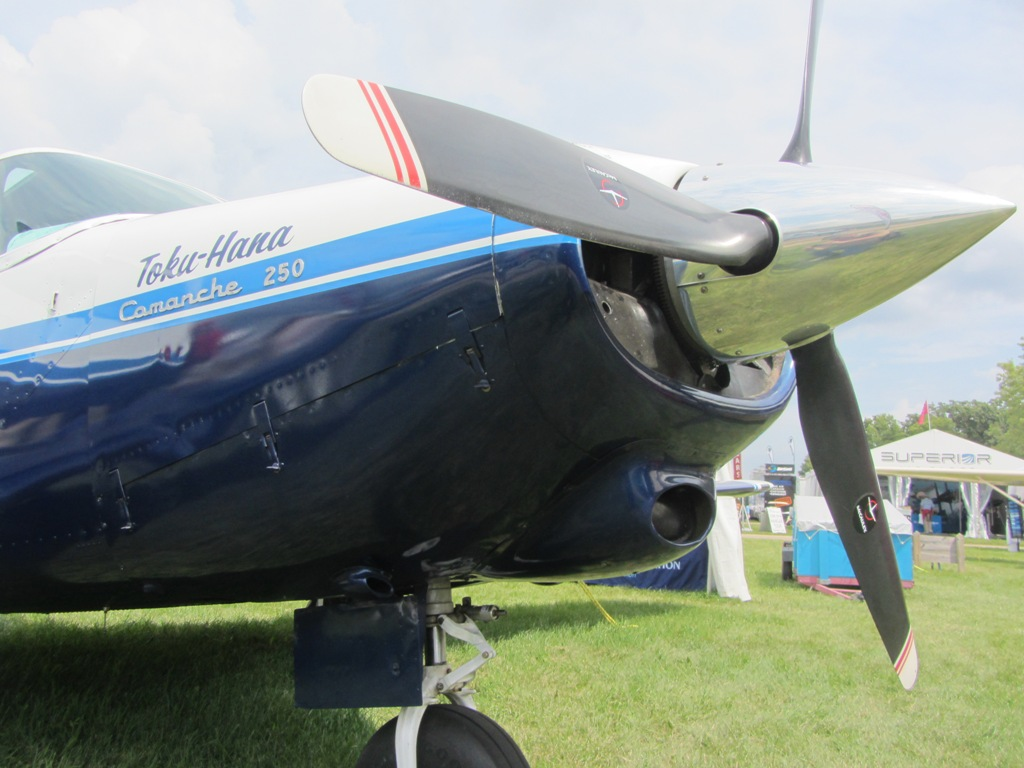
Toku-Hana PA-24-250

In July 1964, Henry Ohye, flying a 1961 PA-24-250, made the first successful trans-Pacific flight from the United States to Japan in a single-engined aircraft. He flew from Los Angeles to Tokyo with stops in Honolulu, Midway, Wake, Guam, and Okinawa.

=== Myth Too ===
A 1966 Comanche 260B, named Myth Too and registered as G-ATOY, was owned by English aviator Sheila Scott. The aircraft, flown by Scott, holds 90 world-class light aviation records. It is on public display at the National Museum of Flight, Scotland.

=== Oldest circumnavigator ===
The circumnavigation by the oldest pilot on record in 1994 was made by Fred Lasby at age 82 in a Comanche 260B.

== Accidents ==
- The 1963 Camden PA-24 crash – On March 5, 1963, country music singers Patsy Cline, Lloyd "Cowboy" Copas, and Hawkshaw Hawkins were on board a Comanche owned and piloted by Cline's manager, Randy Hughes, when it crashed in deteriorating weather near Camden, Tennessee, killing all on board.
- October 12, 2000 – Taking off from a grass strip at a lodge in Kelowna, British Columbia, Canada, a Piper PA-24 Comanche piloted by Colorado State Representative Gary McPherson failed to gain altitude and crashed into trees, killing McPherson and two of the other three people on board.

== Specifications (PA-24-260C) ==
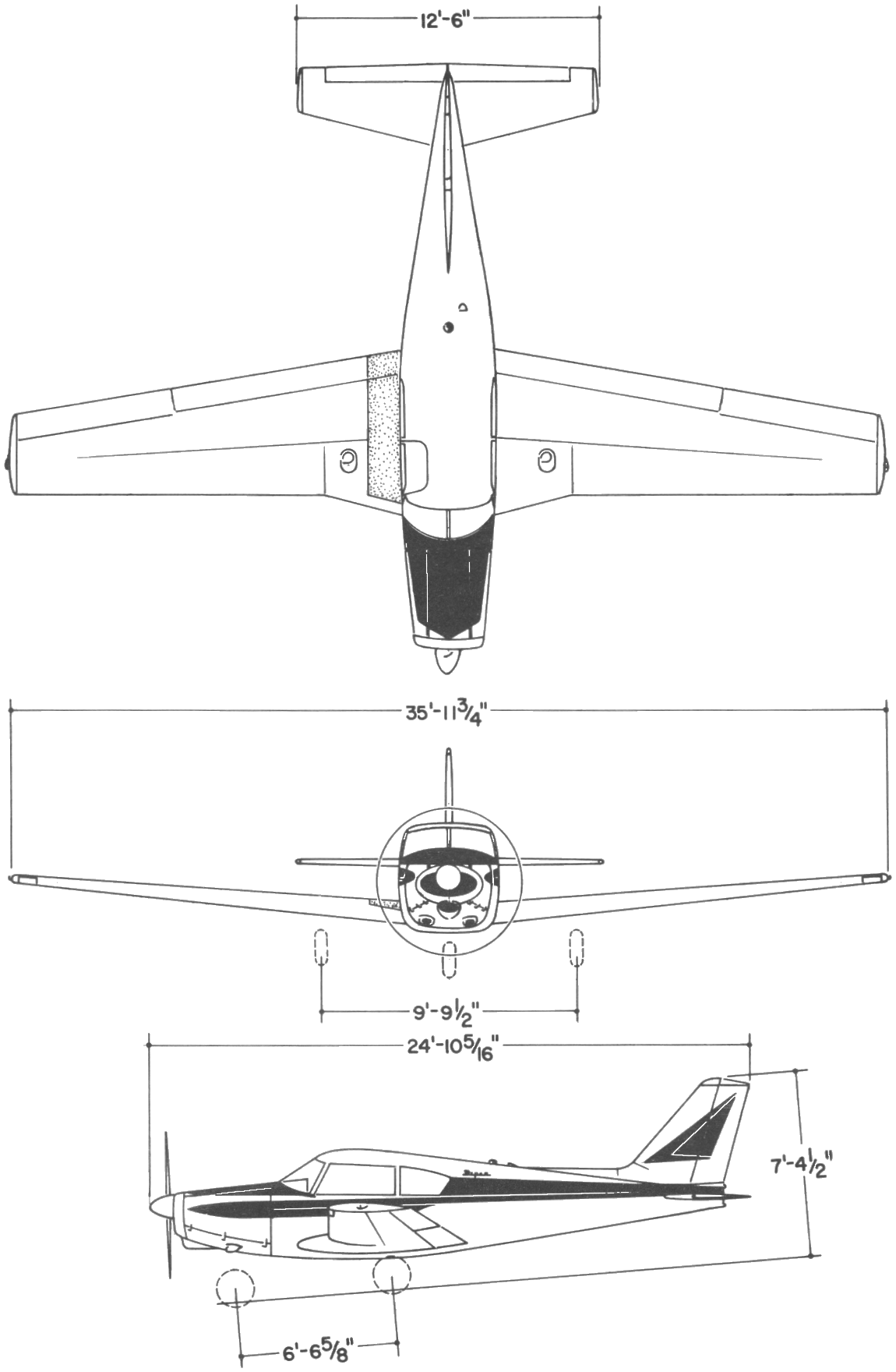
3-view line drawing of the Piper PA-24-180 Comanche

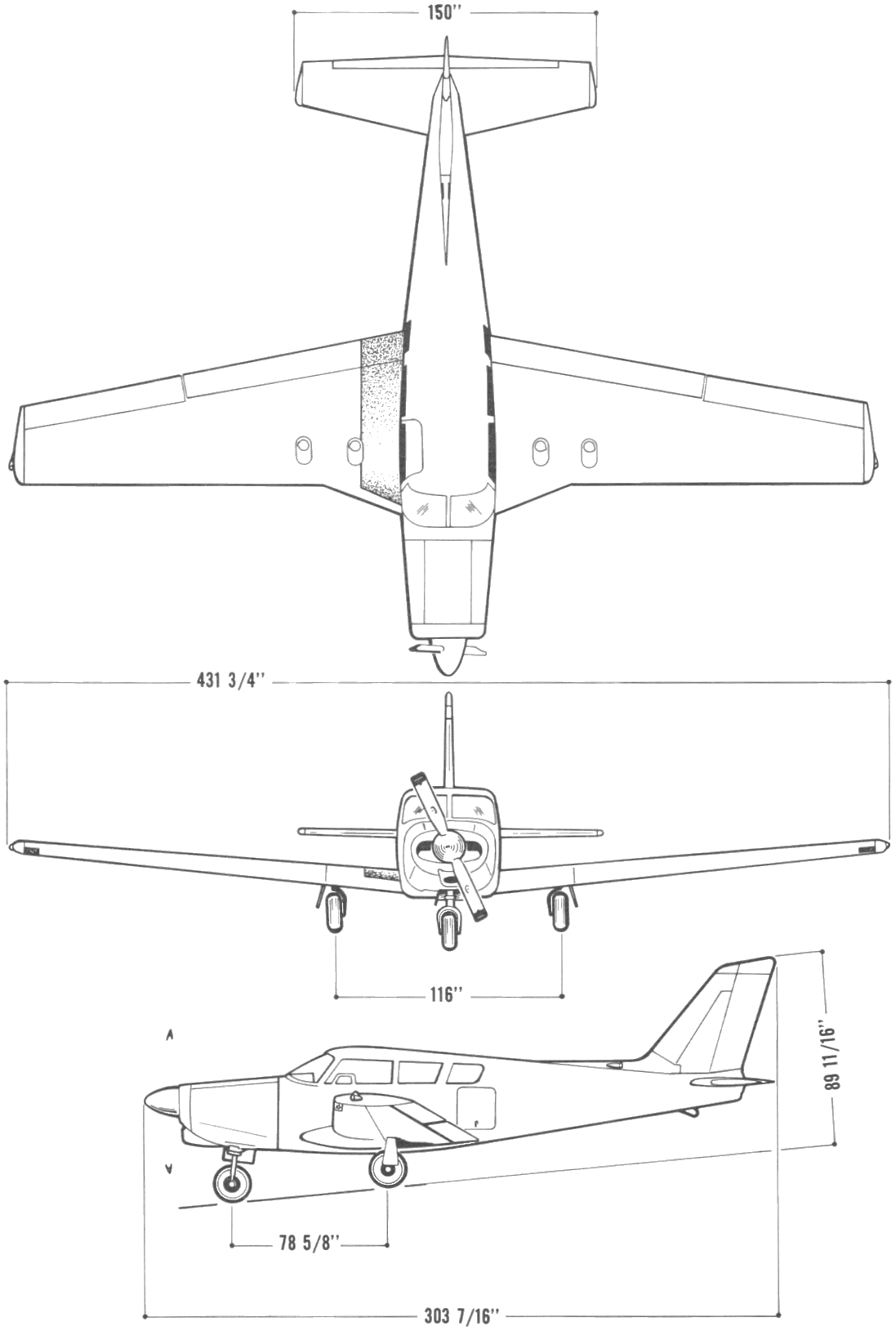
3-view line drawing of the Piper PA-24-260 Comanche B

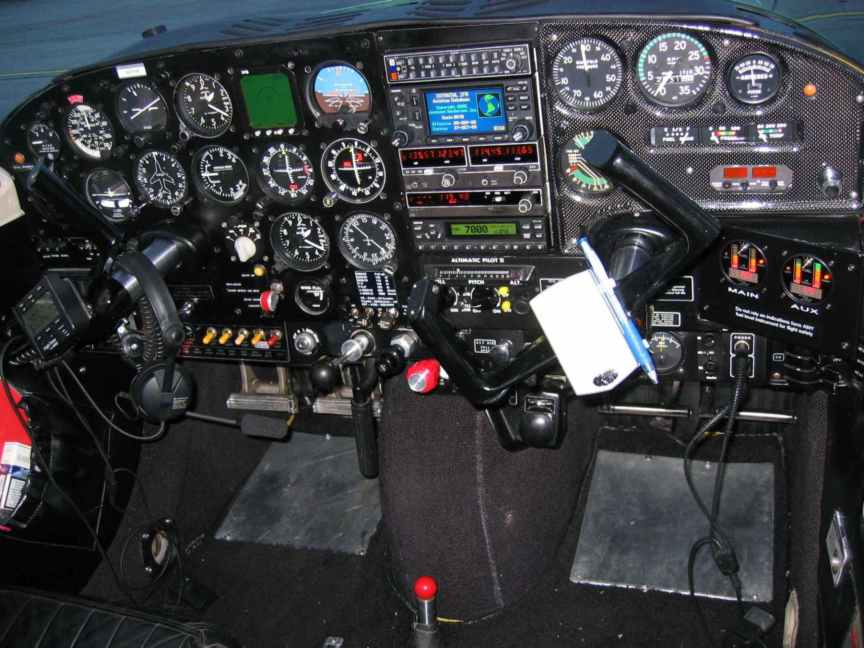
PA-24-260B cockpit

Data from Jane's All the World's Aircraft 1971–72

General characteristics

- Crew: 1
- Capacity: 3–5 passengers
- Length: 25 ft 0 in (7.62 m)
- Wingspan: 36 ft 0 in (10.97 m)
- Height: 7 ft 6 in (2.29 m)
- Wing area: 178 sq ft (16.5 m^{2})
- Aspect ratio: 7.28:1
- Airfoil: NACA64_{2}A215
- Empty weight: 1,773 lb (804 kg)
- Max takeoff weight: 3,200 lb (1,451 kg)
- Fuel capacity: 60 US gal (50 imp gal; 230 L) normal, additional 30 US gal (25 imp gal; 110 L) in optional auxiliary tanks
- Powerplant: 1 × Lycoming IO-540 air-cooled six-cylinder horizontally-opposed engine, 260 hp (190 kW)
- Propellers: 2-bladed Hartzell HC82XK1D metal constant-speed propeller, 6 ft 5 in (1.96 m) diameter

Performance

- Maximum speed: 195 mph (314 km/h, 169 kn) at sea level
- Cruise speed: 185 mph (298 km/h, 161 kn) at 6,300 ft (1,900 m) (max. cruise, 75% power)
- Never exceed speed: 227 mph (365 km/h, 197 kn)
- Range: 1,225 mi (1,971 km, 1,064 nmi) at 10,500 ft (3,200 m) (auxiliary fuel tanks, 65% power)
- Service ceiling: 19,500 ft (5,900 m)
- Rate of climb: 1,320 ft/min (6.7 m/s)
- Takeoff run to 50 ft (15 m): 1,400 ft (430 m)
- Landing run from 50 ft (15 m): 1,200 ft (370 m)
