= Ravin 500 =

South African homebuilt aircraft

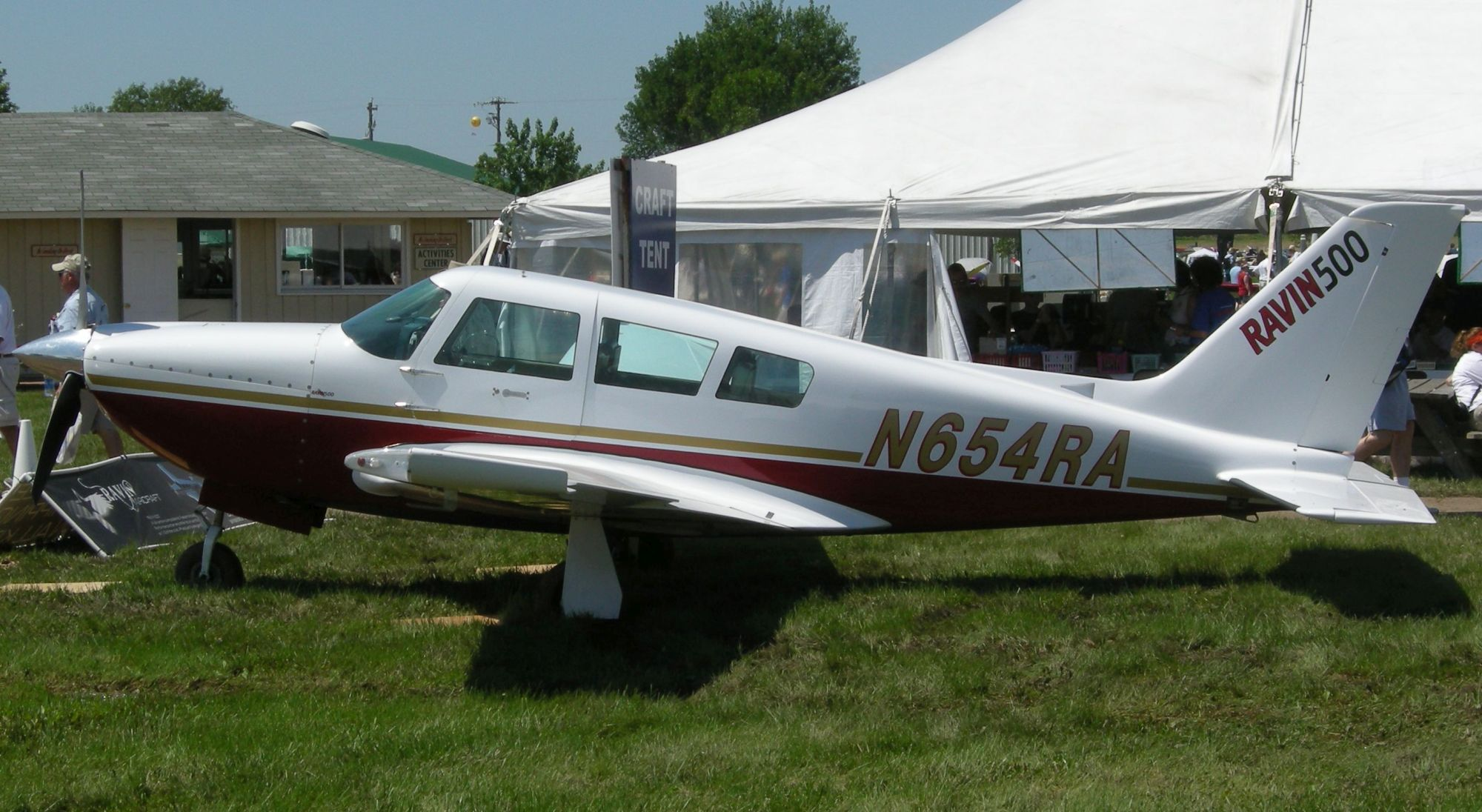

General information
- Type: Amateur-built aircraft
- National origin: South Africa
- Manufacturer: Ravin Aircraft
- Status: In production (2012)
- Number built: 17

History
- First flight: 15 September 2002
- Developed from: Piper PA-24 Comanche

The Ravin 500 is a South African amateur-built aircraft, designed and produced by Ravin Aircraft of Pretoria. The aircraft first flew on 15 September 2002 and is supplied as a kit for amateur construction or as a complete ready-to-fly aircraft.

== Design and development ==
The Ravin 500 is based on the design of the aluminum Piper PA-24 Comanche, but rendered in composite materials and scaled down some 6–7%.

The Ravin 500 features a cantilever low-wing, a four-seat enclosed cabin, accessed by doors, retractable tricycle landing gear and a single engine in tractor configuration. The cabin is 45 in (114 cm) wide.

The aircraft's 35 ft (10.7 m) span wing has an area of 157 sq ft (14.6 m^{2}) and mounts flaps as well as winglets. The aircraft's recommended engine is the 260 to 300 hp (194 to 224 kW) Lycoming IO-540 four-stroke powerplant. Construction time from the supplied kit is estimated as 1400 hours.

== Operational history ==
The company reported that by December 2013 that a total of 22 aircraft or kits had been supplied and that 17 of these have been completed and flown.

== Specifications (Ravin 500) ==
Data from Kitplanes and Ravin Aircraft

General characteristics

- Crew: one
- Capacity: three passengers
- Length: 24 ft 4 in (7.42 m)
- Wingspan: 35 ft 0 in (10.67 m)
- Wing area: 157 sq ft (14.6 m^{2})
- Empty weight: 2,200 lb (998 kg)
- Gross weight: 3,575 lb (1,622 kg)
- Fuel capacity: 160 U.S. gallons (610 L; 130 imp gal)
- Powerplant: 1 × Lycoming IO-540 six cylinder, air-cooled, four stroke aircraft engine, 300 hp (220 kW)
- Propellers: 3-bladed composite

Performance

- Maximum speed: 242 mph (389 km/h, 210 kn)
- Cruise speed: 220 mph (350 km/h, 190 kn)
- Stall speed: 62 mph (100 km/h, 54 kn) flaps down
- Range: 2,200 mi (3,500 km, 1,900 nmi)
- Wing loading: 22.8 lb/sq ft (111 kg/m^{2})
