= Johnson Rocket 185 =

Rocket 185
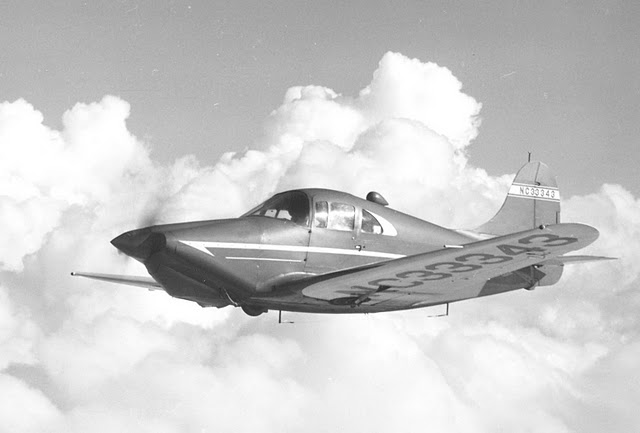

General information
- Type: Cabin monoplane
- National origin: United States
- Manufacturer: Rocket Aircraft
- Designer: Johnson
- Number built: 18

History
- First flight: 1945

The Johnson Rocket 185 was a 1940s American two seat cabin monoplane designed by Johnson and built at Fort Worth, Texas. It was a high performance aircraft for its time, but only 18 were built.

== Development ==
Johnson originally built a homebuilt Rocket 125 which first flew in 1942. The Rocket 125 was a low-wing cabin monoplane powered by a Lycoming O-290 engine. He developed the design into the Rocket 185 with a 185 hp (138 kW) Lycoming O-435-A engine and retractable landing gear. It was a high performance aircraft for the late 1940s with a top speed of 180 mph (290 km/h). In August 1945, Fred Pittera who had been an Advanced Military Pilot Training instructor on the four-engine B-24 Bomber at the nearby Fort Worth Army Air Field, joined the Johnson Rocket Aircraft as a test pilot, flying the P-39 aircraft look-alike through its various test regimens and finally in late 1945 flew the Johnson Rocket 185 with an FAA flight examiner for its first production qualification approval. A Federal Aviation Authority Type Certificate was issued on 10 September 1946. Introduced in August 1945, the Rocket 185 was pitched with the phrase "get a super-performing airplane for only $5,000 – order your 'Rocket' now!". A sales tour began in June 1946. However, because of its high performance and limited seating (two, sometimes three), the market was limited to experienced pilots and only 18 were built.

A four-seat variant was produced as the Bullet 125 but all rights to the two designs were sold on in the early 1950s. The new owner of the design was the Aircraft Manufacturing Company based at Tyler, Texas. They developed a variant of the Bullet powered by a Menasco inline engine and named the Texas Bullet 205 but it was not successful.

== Specifications (Rocket 185) ==
Data from Jane's all the World's Aircraft 1947

General characteristics

- Crew: 1
- Capacity: 1 or 2 passengers
- Length: 21 ft 7 in (6.58 m)
- Wingspan: 31 ft 0 in (9.45 m)
- Height: 7 ft 0 in (2.13 m)
- Wing area: 142 sq ft (13.2 m^{2})
- Empty weight: 1,550 lb (703 kg)
- Gross weight: 2,450 lb (1,111 kg)
- Fuel capacity: 56 US gal (47 imp gal; 210 L) fuel; 3 US gal (2.5 imp gal; 11 L) oil
- Powerplant: 1 × Lycoming O-435-A 6-cyl. horizontally-opposed air-cooled piston engine, 185 hp (138 kW)

Performance

- Cruise speed: 185 mph (298 km/h, 161 kn)
- Stall speed: 54 mph (87 km/h, 47 kn) (landing speed)
- Range: 925 mi (1,489 km, 804 nmi)
- Service ceiling: 24,500 ft (7,500 m)
- Rate of climb: 2,000 ft/min (10 m/s)
- Wing loading: 18 lb/sq ft (88 kg/m^{2})
- Power/mass: 13.2 lb/hp (9.24 kg/kW)

== See also ==
Aircraft of comparable role, configuration, and era

- Aeronca Arrow
- Culver Cadet
- Globe GC-1 Swift
- Piper PT-1
