= 1952 Dallas mid-air collision =

1952 mid-air collision

American Airlines Flight 910
Accident
- Date: June 28, 1952
- Summary: Mid-air collision
- Site: Dallas, Texas; 32°50′53″N 96°51′04″W
- Total fatalities: 2
- Total survivors: 60

First aircraft
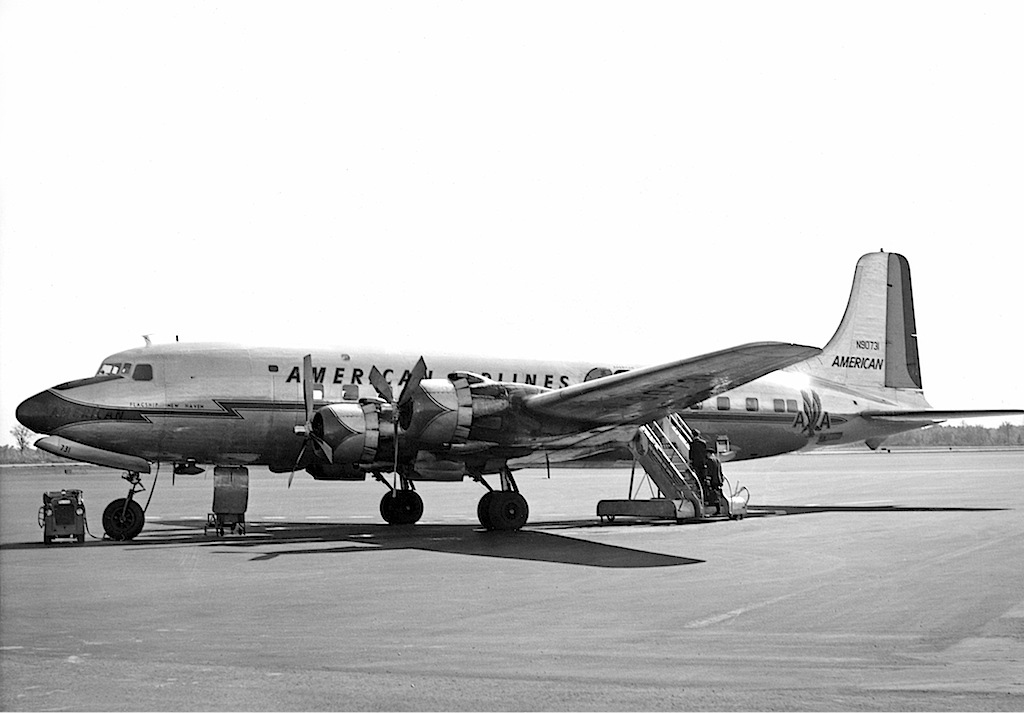
- A Douglas DC-6 similar to the accident aircraft
- Type: Douglas DC-6
- Operator: American Airlines
- Registration: N90750
- Flight origin: San Francisco International Airport
- Destination: Dallas Love Field
- Occupants: 60
- Passengers: 55
- Crew: 5
- Fatalities: 0
- Survivors: 60

Second aircraft
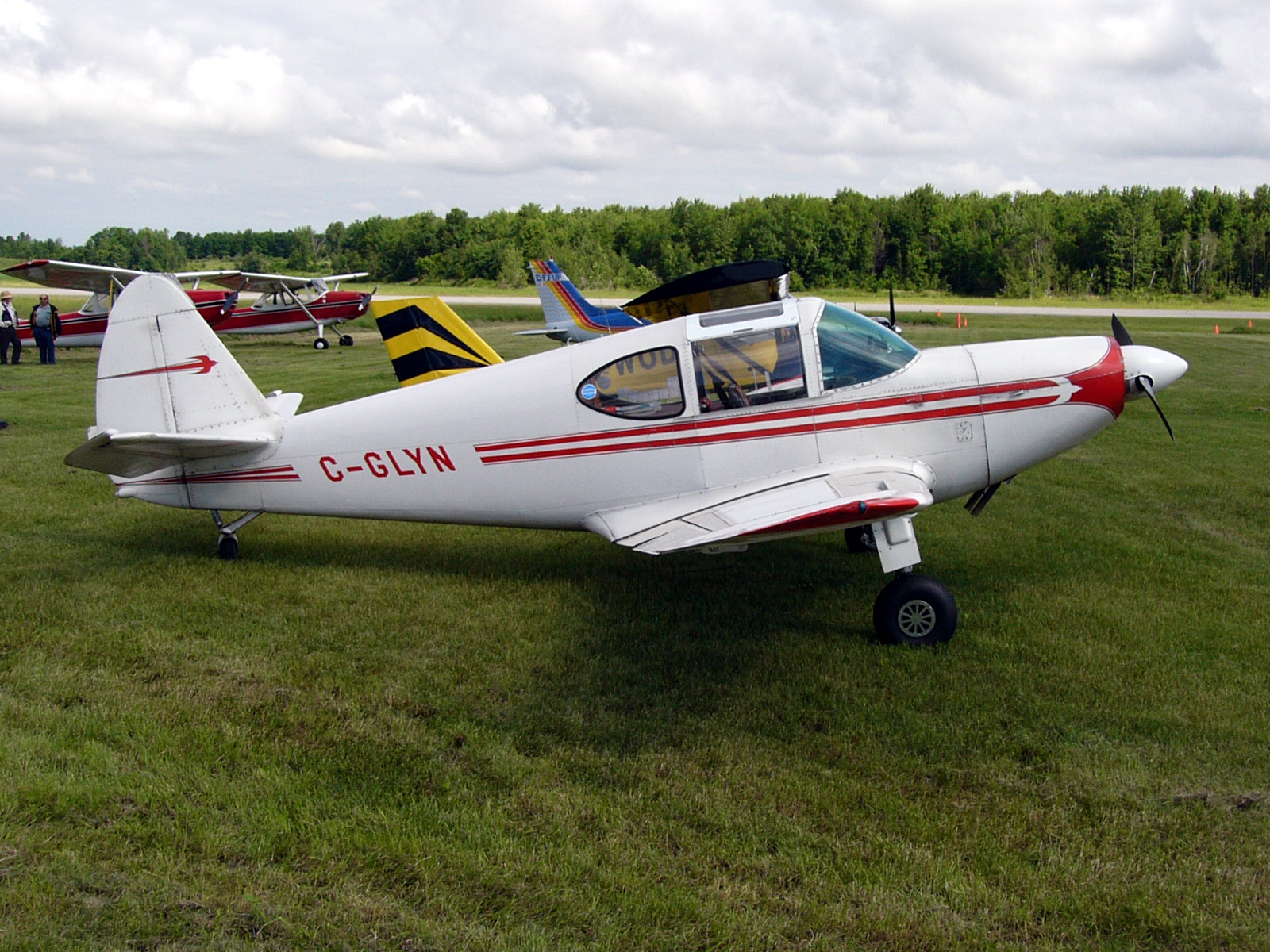
- A Globe/Temco Swift GC-1B similar to the accident aircraft
- Type: Temco Swift
- Operator: Private
- Registration: N3858K
- Flight origin: Denton, Texas
- Destination: Dallas Love Field
- Occupants: 2
- Passengers: 1
- Crew: 1
- Fatalities: 2
- Survivors: 0

American Airlines Flight 910, a four-engine Douglas DC-6 propliner, collided in mid-air with a single engine Temco Swift on final approach to Dallas Love Field on June 28, 1952, over Dallas, Texas. The DC-6 was carrying 55 passengers and 5 crew members from San Francisco, California. The DC-6 landed with no injuries to any of its 60 occupants, while both occupants of the two-person Swift died when their aircraft impacted the ground.

== Background ==
The two-seat, single-engine Temco Swift aircraft was a Model GC 1B, serial number 3558, manufactured on May 24, 1948.

It was occupied by pilot Paul Brower, who owned the aircraft, and passenger Don Walker, both of Denton, Texas. Brower, who was 19 years old, had logged a total of 250 flight hours, and had been granted his private pilot license only 3 days earlier. Both Brower and Walker were employees of Central Airlines at Love Field, and Brower had been commuting to work in his airplane almost daily for the past few months.

American Airlines Flight 910, a four-engine DC-6 propliner, departed San Francisco for Dallas at 23:05 on June 27, and made three scheduled stops on its way to Dallas–Love Field. On board was a flight crew of three, Captain G. H. Woolweaver, First Officer James R. Poe, Flight Engineer John Barrett, and a cabin crew of two flight attendants, Arlene Siebert and Anita Schmidt. 55 passengers were on board for the final segment of the flight from El Paso to Dallas.

At 06:56 of the following morning, the Swift aircraft departed Denton, Texas on a VFR flight for Dallas–Love Field, and as it neared its destination the pilot contacted Love tower for landing instructions, requesting a "straight-in" approach.

Flight 910 had canceled its IFR clearance earlier, flying VFR during its final flight segment, and received landing clearance for Runway 13. The First Officer, seated on the right, was flying the aircraft, and was guiding it down the ILS glidepath and localizer, while maintaining visual contact with the ground. The crew could hear the tower give instructions to a light aircraft nearby.

== Collision ==
At an altitude of 400 ft (120 m) above ground level, First Officer Poe suddenly spotted the Swift under the fuselage of the DC-6 but was unable to take evasive action, and the two aircraft collided. The airliner's flight crew continued the approach and landed without incident; the DC-6 was almost completely unscathed except for minor damage to a fuselage-mounted radio antenna and a propeller. Capt. Woolweaver never clearly saw the other airplane and was unsure what had happened until the airliner had landed and he was able to talk to people who had witnessed the collision.

Witnesses aboard the DC-6 saw the Swift fly into the DC-6's outer right propeller. The collision severed most of the left wing of the Swift, threw the small aircraft over the fuselage of the DC-6, thus damaging the airliner's antenna, and sent the Swift spiraling into a northwest Dallas street. A nearby resident heard the crash from inside his home and ran to render aid, but found Brower and Walker already dead. The wreck subsequently caught fire and had to be extinguished by Dallas firefighters; however, the blaze was attributed to leaking avgas ignited by a cigarette discarded by a spectator, and not to the crash itself.

== Investigation ==
The accident was investigated by the Civil Aeronautics Board, which issued its final report on March 3, 1953.

The CAB primarily attributed the crash to the failure of the Swift's pilot to exercise proper caution during his landing approach. The Swift's pilot radioed the Love tower to request a straight-in approach, but he did so much closer to the airport than recommended by flight regulations, he did not state his position, heading, or speed, and he failed to establish two-way communication to obtain a landing clearance. If a pilot could not establish clear contact with the tower, visual flight rules stated that he should only continue the approach with extreme caution under the assumption that conflicting air traffic was in the area. Instead, he continued the straight-in approach as if he had been properly cleared to land. Due to the lack of communication with the Swift, controllers were unaware of the proximity of the two aircraft until the Swift was spotted from the tower, leaving inadequate time to warn the airliner's crew of the situation.

The Swift's initial position was below, behind, and to the right of the DC-6, so the Swift's pilot should have easily been able to see the large DC-6 overhead and to his left. From the viewpoint of the DC-6 flight crew, the Swift may have been in a blind spot created by the DC-6 nose structure; if not, the small silver-grey plane would be hard to see silhouetted against the ground.

A contributing factor was "errors in judgment" on the part of a Love Field controller who initially instructed the Swift's pilot to turn into the path of the DC-6 upon spotting the second aircraft. The controller, who was relying on his vision to sequence aircraft for landing, initially misidentified the Swift as a larger Beechcraft Bonanza. This caused an error in depth perception, as he concluded that there was a larger aircraft behind the DC-6 rather than a smaller aircraft on a collision course. He rapidly realized his error and retracted his instruction, telling the Swift's pilot to turn away, but the small plane did not initiate a turn until seconds before the collision.

Investigators discovered corroded wiring between the Swift's radio and antenna, which could explain the poor communication with the pilot. However, the radio was reportedly operating properly the day before the crash.
