= LoPresti Fury =

Fury

General information
- Type: Sports plane
- Manufacturer: LoPresti
- Designer: Roy LoPresti
- Number built: 1

History
- First flight: 1988
- Developed from: Globe Swift

The LoPresti Fury is a prototype sports plane built in the United States in the late 1980s. It is a fast two-seat low wing tail dragger, based on the Globe Swift and made of sheet aluminum. The current engine is a Lycoming IO-360-A1B6, giving the Fury a max speed of 222 mph. The aircraft will carry two adults with up to 100 pounds of baggage and has a range of 1000 miles.

Originally designed by Roy LoPresti while working at LoPresti Piper Aircraft Engineering Company, he eventually secured rights to the design following the bankruptcy of the company.

== Operational history ==
The aircraft was displayed at Sun 'n Fun in 1989 as the SwiftFury. Over 500 orders were placed for the aircraft prior to Piper's bankruptcy in 1991.

== Specifications (prototype, converted Swift) ==
General characteristics

- Crew: One pilot
- Capacity: 1 passenger
- Wingspan: 29 ft 4 in (8.93 m)
- Wing area: 139 sq ft (12.9 m^{2})
- Empty weight: 1,450 lb (660 kg)
- Gross weight: 2,300 lb (1,050 kg)
- Powerplant: 1 × Lycoming IO-360-A1B6 , 200 hp (150 kW)

Performance

- Maximum speed: 222 mph (355 km/h, 193 kn)
- Range: 1,000 mi (1,600 km, 870 nmi)
- Service ceiling: 21,000 ft (6,400 m)
- Rate of climb: 1,350 ft/min (6.9 m/s)
