= Roy LoPresti =

American aeronautical engineer

- Born: Leroy Patrick LoPresti; 9 June 1929
- Died: 7 August 2002 (aged 73); Lyndhurst, New Jersey
- Education: New York University
- Known for: Aircraft Engineering
- Parent(s): Agnes LaRusso LoPresti and Patrick LoPresti

The LoPresti Fury

LeRoy Patrick "Roy" LoPresti (June 9, 1929 – August 7, 2002) was an eclectic American aeronautical engineer. He worked on projects as diverse as the Apollo Moon Program and missile design, served as advisor to the US Congress, became known as "Mr. Fast" in the general aviation field, and created an aircraft manufacturing, design and support company which is still in existence.

LoPresti designed the Grumman American AA-5, was Chief Engineer and Vice President of Engineering at Mooney where he designed the Mooney 201, and worked at both Beech Aircraft and Piper Aircraft before starting his own company, LoPresti Speed Merchants. Speed Merchants is obtaining FAA certification of the LoPresti Fury.

== Biography ==
Roy LoPresti was born to Agnes LaRusso LoPresti and Patrick LoPresti in Lyndhurst, New Jersey. While attending New York University as an Aeronautical Engineering student Roy won a Chance Vought Design Award for "Best Student Light Airplane Design".

LoPresti graduated in 1950 and obtained employment with Grumman Aerospace on Long Island, New York, but was soon called to serve in the United States Air Force during the Korean War. He became a pilot in the Air Force, serving a total of six years. During the Korean War he met and married Margaret "Peggy" LoPresti (1952). They would eventually have five children, a daughter and four sons. After his wartime service he returned to work at Wright Field on fighter design (flying and designing), a job he stated was "made in heaven."

When he returned to Grumman, LoPresti worked on missile designs, but was later put in charge of design at their recently acquired American Aviation division in Cleveland, Ohio. American Aircraft was the current holder of the Bede BD-1 design rights, after Jim Bede had been forced from the company. The BD-1 had promise, but required numerous fixes that American couldn't afford on their own. LoPresti redesigned the aircraft and produced the famed Grumman American AA-5 and its derivatives. He stayed at Grumman for 16 years, during which time he worked on the Apollo Lunar Module, among other projects.

During the 1970s he moved to Mooney Aircraft where he led an aerodynamic cleanup of the M20F Executive and called it the Mooney 201. Starting with the already stretched frame of the M20F, LoPresti improved the aerodynamics via a more slanted windshield, sleeker cowling, and some other minor cleanup items. It was the first aircraft to achieve 200 mph (201 mph top speed) on 200 horsepower (150 kW). He also led design of the 201's larger cousins, the 231, 252 and 301.

In a 1979 interview, LoPresti predicted that by the year 2000, most general aviation aircraft would be essentially unchanged in airframe and powerplants. He felt radical new designs and materials would not be marketable and only a few examples would be produced.

He then became the Vice President of Engineering at Beech Aircraft in Wichita, Kansas, to lead development of the unconventional Beech Starship. The Starship development was completed as the general aviation market was in a process of rapidly downsizing, and LoPresti became increasingly frustrated as he was put into a series of management positions making missiles and bombs. When he expressed his frustration to his wife, she advised him to quit.

In 1987 LoPresti took her advice and joined Piper Aircraft in Vero Beach, Florida. Piper's new parent, Romeo Charley, had recently restructured the company from bankruptcy, and was looking for new products. They were contacted by the Swift Museum Foundation, seeking someone to produce the Globe Swift with a variety of upgrades that had been incorporated by its users over the years. The project was put under LoPriesti's care, and the SwiftFire and SwiftFury designs emerged. They showed the prototype at EAA AirVenture Oshkosh in 1988 and returned with 131 orders, each with a $10,000 deposit.

In spite of this promising start, Piper went bankrupt in 1991, leading to a huge legal squabble over the rights to the designs. LoPresti formed LoPresti Speed Merchants as an upgrade firm, making modifications to existing aircraft to make them fly faster. They also created a large fixed-base operation in Florida. The company finally gained the rights to build the upgraded Globe Swift, which is now called the LoPresti Fury.

During the 1980s LoPresti served on the Aeronautical Advisory Committee to the US Congress. In 1990 he received the Godfrey L. Talbot Trophy for outstanding contributions to the science of aerospace engineering, from the Aero Club of New England.

LoPresti was climbing a ladder to clear leaves from his house's rain gutter when he slipped and fell. He died 35 days later (7 August 2002) of complications from the fall.
