= Piper PA-30 Twin Comanche =

American twin-engined cabin monoplane built 1962–1972

PA-30 Twin Comanche
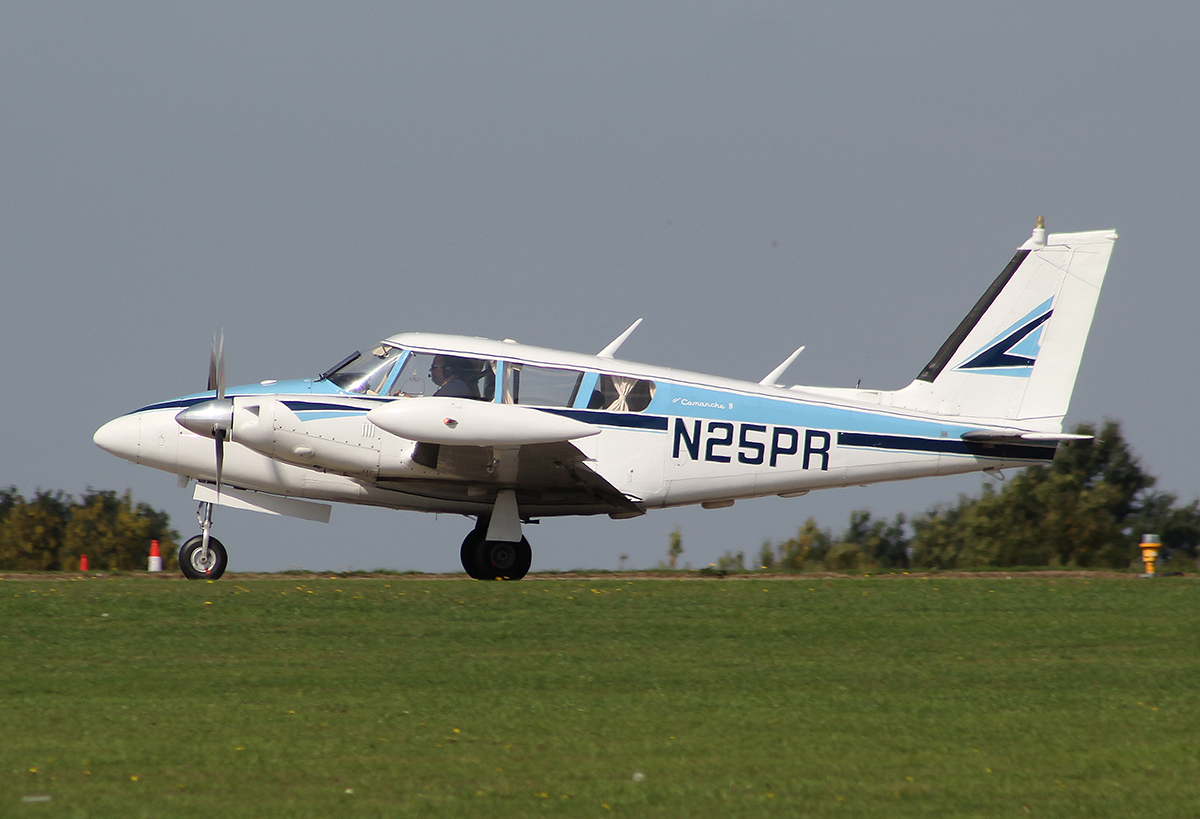
- 1967 Twin Comanche C/R

General information
- Type: Cabin monoplane
- National origin: United States
- Manufacturer: Piper Aircraft
- Number built: PA-30: 2,001; PA-39: 155

History
- Manufactured: 1961–1972
- First flight: November 7, 1962
- Developed from: Piper PA-24 Comanche

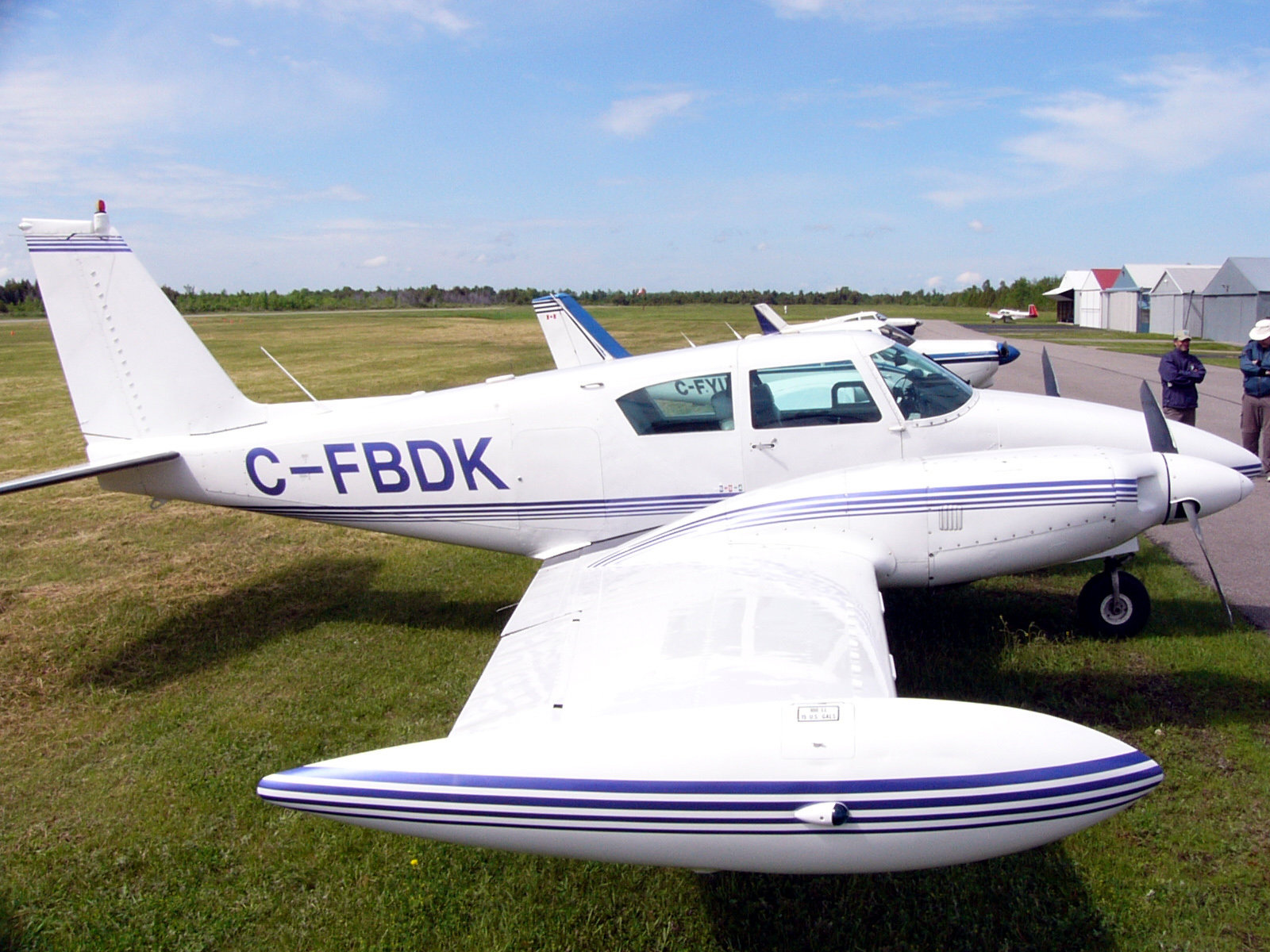
Turbo PA-30 with tip tanks and vortex generators installed

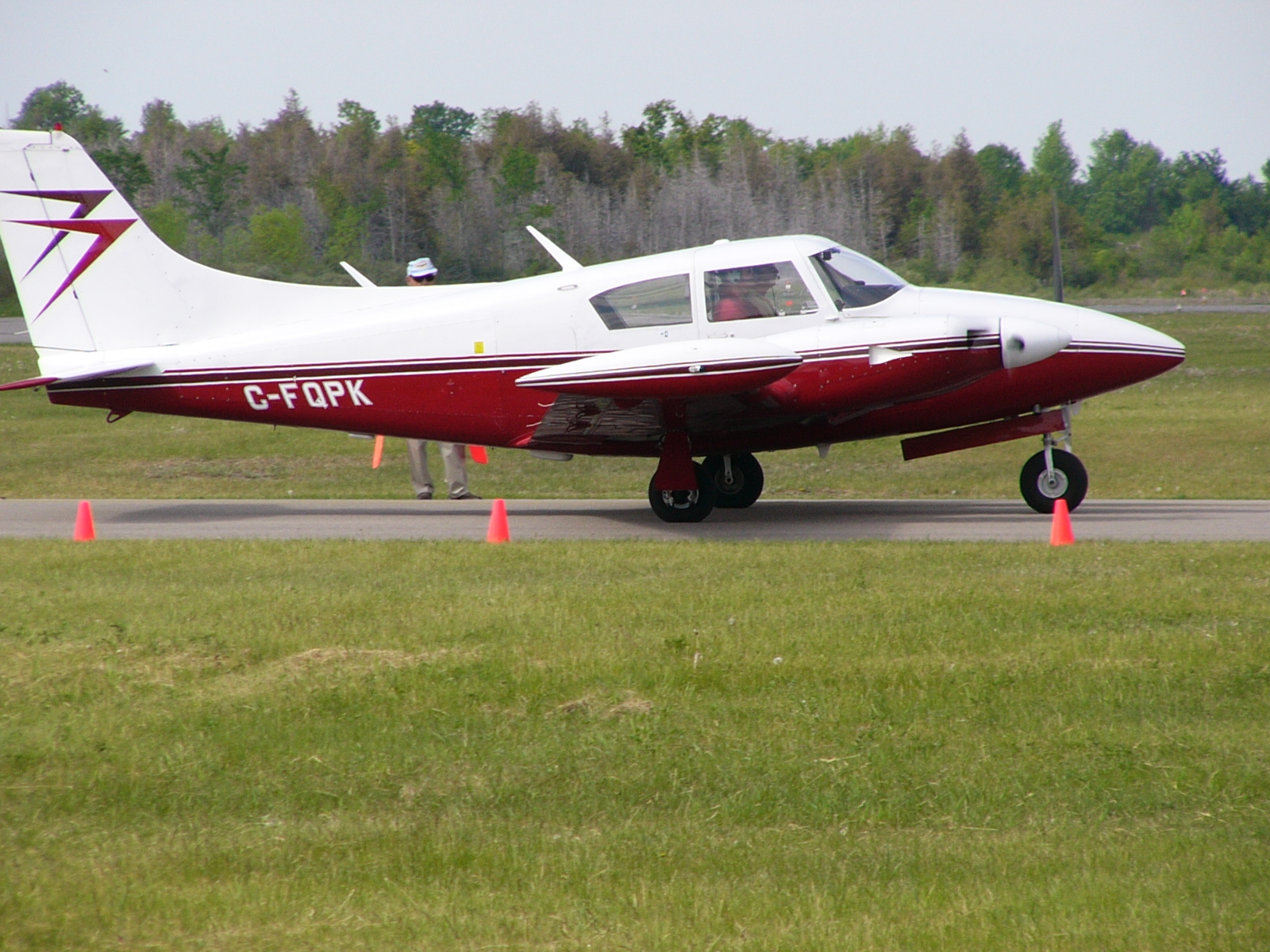
PA-30 Twin Comanche with modified dorsal fin and modified air intake in nacelles

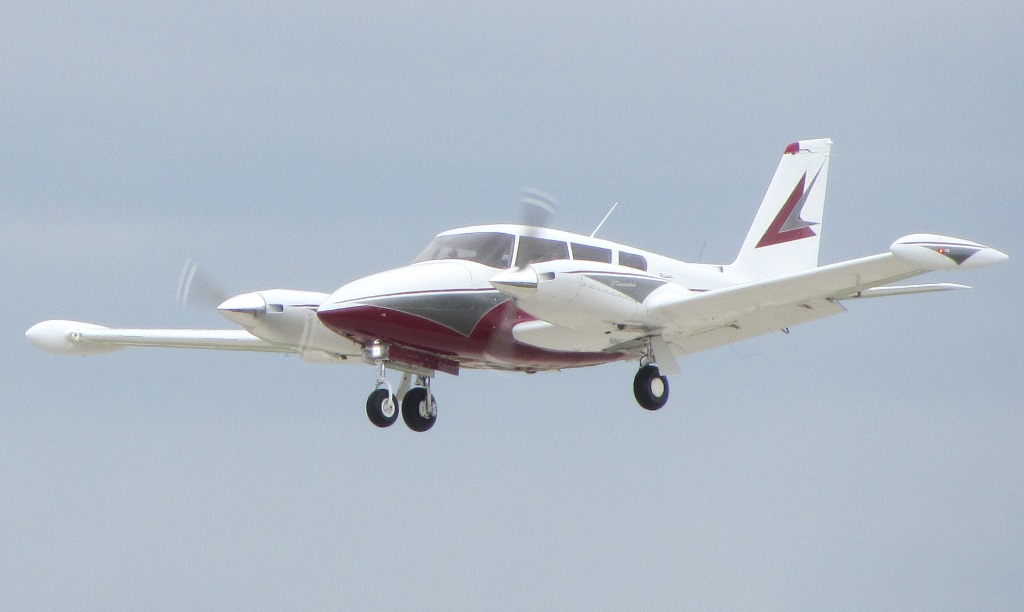
PA-30 Twin Comanche

The Piper PA-30 Twin Comanche is an American twin-engined cabin monoplane designed and built by Piper Aircraft. It was a twin-engined development of the PA-24 Comanche single-engined aircraft. A variant with counter-rotating propellers was designated the Piper PA-39 Twin Comanche C/R.

== Development ==
The Piper PA-30 Twin Comanche was designed as a twin-engined variant of the Piper PA-24 Comanche. A complex light twin, with retractable landing gear, seating 4 (in original models) to 6 (in later models), and cruise speeds ranging from 160–210 mph on twin 160 horsepower engines, it competed with the more-powerful Cessna 310 and Beech Baron, and later with Piper's other light twins.

The Twin Comanche was designed to replace the Piper Apache in the company's lineup of products. The prototype was converted from the single-engined Comanche by Ed Swearingen who at the time operated a facility that specialized in the modification of production aircraft. A Comanche was modified with two 4-cylinder 160 hp (120 kW) Lycoming IO-320-B1A engines and first flew at San Antonio, Texas on 12 Apr 1961. The design was designated the PA-30 on March 17, 1962 and named the Twin Comanche. The prototype (registered N7000Y) was built at Lock Haven and first flew on November 7, 1962. FAA Type approval was awarded on February 5, 1963, the first production aircraft was completed on April 2, 1963 and the first delivery made on July 15, 1963.

The first Twin Commanche B was announced on September 2, 1965 with deliveries starting in November 1965. The aircraft had minor changes with two additional seats and an extra cabin window on each side. A turbocharged variant of the Twin Comanche B was available with 160 hp (120 kW) Lycoming IO-320-C1A engines.

In 1966, the PA-30-200 was developed with two 200 hp engines, the prototype first flew on January 16, 1967 but Piper decided not to put the variant into production. Following the cancellation of the PA-30-200, the company introduced the Twin Comanche C. It had a new interior, a different external paint scheme, and a higher cruise speed. First deliveries of the Twin Comanche C were made in November 1968. The last PA-30 was completed at Lock Haven on November 5, 1969 when it was replaced on the line by the PA-39.

During 1969, a number of developments to improve the flight characteristics of the PA-30 were tested which resulted in the Twin Comanche D with counter-rotating engines, the prototype first flying on September 23, 1969. For marketing reasons, the type was re-designated the PA-39 and received FAA Type Approval on November 28, 1969. The first production aircraft was completed on December 23, 1969.

The Twin Comanche was produced on the same Lock Haven, Pennsylvania, production line as its single-engined cousin; production ceased when the factory was flooded in 1972. Piper chose at that time to focus on its equally popular Cherokee 140/180/235/Arrow line, manufactured in Florida, and its highly popular twin-engined Seneca, which is essentially a Twin Cherokee Six. The Piper PA-40 Arapaho had been scheduled to replace the PA-39 in the 1973–74 timeframe. Three were manufactured, and the aircraft was already fully certified when the decision was made not to proceed with the manufacture.

== Design ==
The Twin Comanche is a low-wing cantilever monoplane with a retractable tricycle landing gear. With tip tanks, the aircraft holds 120 gallons (454 L) of fuel. Fuel burn at typical cruise settings is approximately 16 gal/h (58.7 L/h) with a cruise speed of 165 kn. It easily climbs to 18,000 feet (5,500 m) when desired (24,000 feet (7,300 m), if turbocharged). When compared with the Seminole, the Twin Comanche goes faster, carries more, burns less fuel, climbs more rapidly and ultimately higher, and is quieter. When compared to the Seneca, which is really quite a different aircraft, the more noticeable differences are in handling. Another contemporary competitor to the Twin Comanche was the Beechcraft Travel Air. A similar airplane in form and function was the Gulfstream American GA-7 Cougar, which went into production after the Twin Comanche's production run ended.

== Operational history ==
The Twin Comanche suffered a number of V_{MC} (Velocity Minimum Controllable) loss-of-control crashes in the 1960s and early 1970s. Initially, focus was placed on the aircraft design and the FAA reacted by issuing an airworthiness directive changing the V_{MC} speed, though there was no change in the aerodynamics. At the time, well known aviation journalist, Richard L. Collins, was highly critical of the FAA's multiengine training standards which encouraged unsafe V_{MC} demonstrations at low altitude. Collins pointed out in another article that year that one FBO had suffered four fatal V_{MC} roll-over spins. Two were in a Twin Comanche, One in a Beech Travel Air and one in a Beech Baron. It is not surprising that the Twin Comanche had a higher number of such crashes as it was used more often as a training aircraft. The FAA performed a series of flight tests on the Twin Comanche and NASA conducted wind tunnel tests and found no unusual tendency to spin beyond what would normally be expected given the airflow of the normally rotating propellers.

In the 1970s, the FAA changed its training standards and required flight instructors to obtain a separate rating to teach in multiengine aircraft. The V_{MC} crashes dissipated dramatically. In 1997, the Aircraft Owners and Pilots Association (AOPA) Air Safety Institute published a safety review of the Comanche series aircraft and concluded that the Twin Comanche showed no greater tendency for V_{MC} roll-over spins than comparable aircraft. Kristin Winter, a long time Twin Comanche instructor, operator, and trained accident investigator, reviewed the NTSB records for a ten-year period ending in 2014 and concluded that the Air Safety Institute's report was correct in its conclusions. Of the six single engine loss of control crashes, most resulted from inexperienced pilots and substandard training.

Prince William of Gloucester bought a Twin Comanche and used it as his personal aircraft for several years in the 1960s. He flew it from the United Kingdom to Nigeria, where he held a diplomatic post; then later returned in it to the United Kingdom and flew it to Japan when he took up a diplomatic post in that country.

A Twin Comanche was flown in the 1992 and 1994 French Arc en Ciel air races. It is the only US aircraft to have raced twice around the world. In the pilot-skilled races, 1992 pilot and Pioneer Hall of Fame enshrinee and 100 Aviation Hero for the First Century of Flight, Marion P. Jayne and her daughter Nancy Palozola placed second. In 1994 Jayne and her daughter, Patricia Jayne (Pat) Keefer won the FAI Gold Medal in what, so far, is the longest race in history at over 21,000 miles flown May 1–24, 1994. With FAA approval the twin carried a total of 252 gallons in 11 tanks and at maximum power went over 2,100 miles nonstop between Marrakech, Morocco and Istanbul, Turkey in 11:19 hours.

All Twin Comanche engines have long times between overhaul (2000 hours for the B1A, 1800 for the IO-320-C1A) and have developed a reputation for reliability.

Following a string of crashes involving pilot loss-of-control in single-engine flight (due to engine failure, or in pilot training for engine-failure conditions), Piper sought to alter the plane's single-engine behavior at low airspeeds (such as takeoff and landing). The resulting PA-39 Twin Comanche C/R was a modified version with counter-rotating engines (to eliminate the "critical engine" which, when failed, created the greatest risk of loss-of-control). The PA-39 replaced the PA-30 in the early 1970s. At least one comparative study of U.S. crash rates for the PA-30 and PA-39 indicated that crash rates for the counter-rotating PA-39 were only one-third of those for the conventional PA-30. Piper subsequently expanded the counter-rotating engine development to its other light twins.

Piper PA-30 Twin Comanche has had multiple safety incidents, including fatal accidents also in the 21st century. As of November 3, 2019, 80 PA-39's remain on the Federal Aviation Administration (FAA) registry.

== Variants ==
Three versions of the PA-30 were produced: the original, a B model, and a C model. The B and C models can carry six passengers and can be identified by the additional side windows. Factory turbocharged engines became available with the B model. Turbo models can be identified by the presence of vents on the nacelle sides. These use Rajay turbochargers with manual wastegates operated by twin knobs under the throttle quadrant. They are properly termed "turbonormalized" since the compression ratio and maximum manifold pressure remained unchanged. Pilots are required to use care to avoid overboosting at low altitudes, since no overboost popoff valves are used. Since there is no accompanying power increase, the B/C models simply give owners a fuel vs. passenger tradeoff. The two rearmost seats, occupying the baggage compartment, are quite small.

PA-30 Twin Comanche
Four-seat twin-engined cabin aircraft powered by two 160 hp (119 kW) Lycoming IO-320-B1A engines in wing-mounted nacelles. The aircraft was available in five levels of equipment fit:

Standard.
Custom – additional instruments
Executive – additional instruments and radio equipment
Sportsman – Palm Beach interior and exterior and AltiMaticII autopilot
Professional – full IFR panel

PA-30 Twin Comanche B
PA-30 with a third cabin window on each side and an optional fifth or sixth seat
PA-30 Turbo Twin Comanche
Turbonormalized version of the PA-30B Twin Comanche, powered by two Rajay turbonormalized IO-320-C1A piston engines
PA-30 Twin Comanche C
Twin Comanche B with new instrument panel, switches, and other minor variations. Optional turbonormalized version.
PA-30-200
Experimental variant with two 200 hp Lycoming engines, one built
PA-30-290
Experimental variant with two 290 hp Lycoming IO-540-G engines, one converted from PA-30 prototype
PA-30 Twin Comanche D
Original designation for the PA-39.
PA-39 Twin Comanche C/R
PA-30 with counter-rotating 160 hp Lycoming IO-320-B1A engines and modified wing leading edges
PA-39 Turbo Twin Comanche C/R
Turbocharged version of the PA-39 Twin Comanche C/R
Piper PA-40 Arapaho
Developed and fully certified version of PA-39 with entirely different wing and extensive fuselage modifications. Three prototypes only.

== Specifications (PA-39) ==
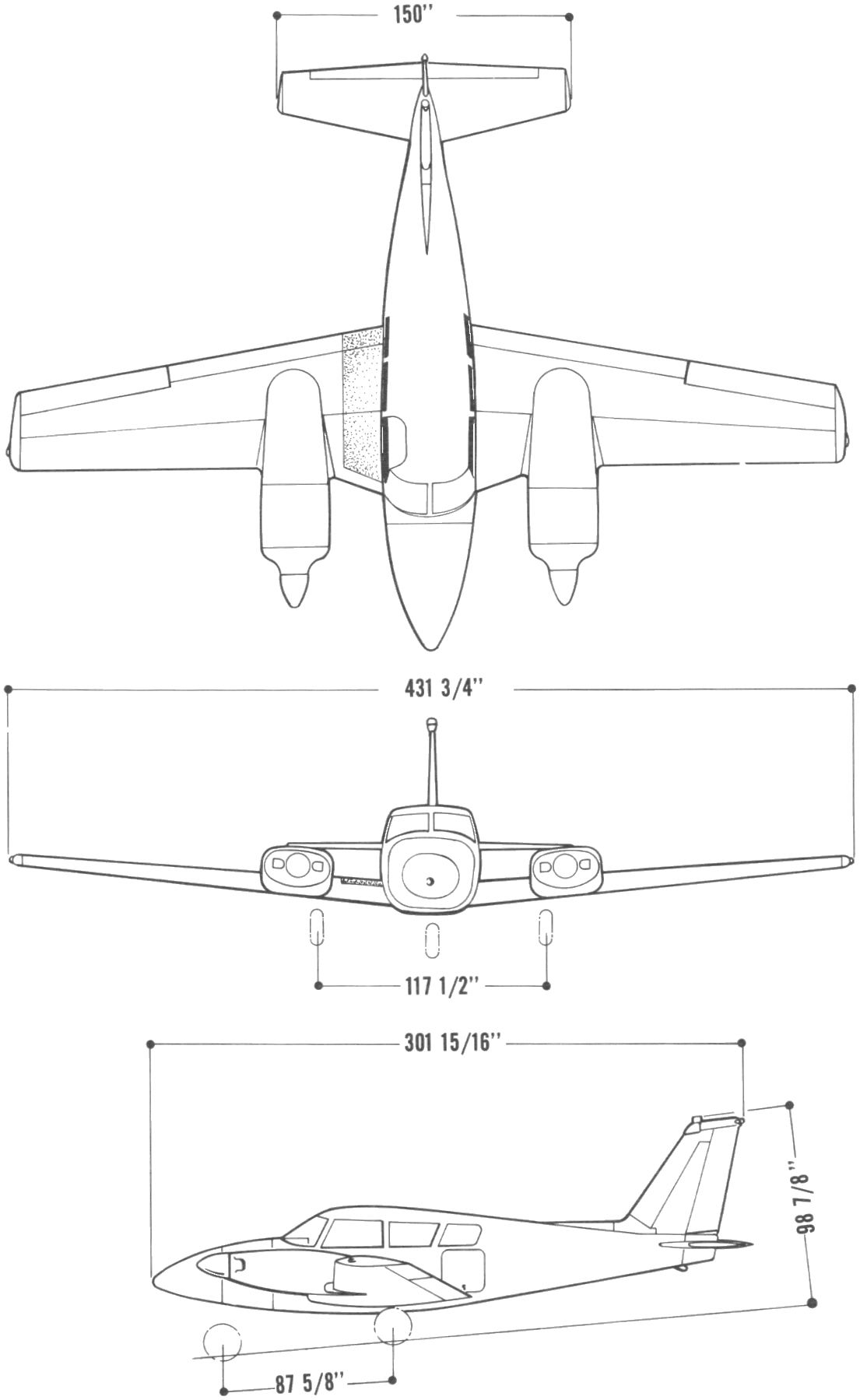
3-view line drawing of the Piper PA-30 Twin Comanche B

Data from Jane's All The World's Aircraft 1971–72

General characteristics

- Capacity: 4–6
- Length: 25 ft 2 in (7.67 m)
- Wingspan: 36 ft 9 1/2 in (11.214 m) (including tip tanks)
- Height: 8 ft 3 in (2.51 m)
- Wing area: 178.0 sq ft (16.54 m^{2})
- Aspect ratio: 7.28:1
- Airfoil: NACA 64_{2}A215
- Empty weight: 2,270 lb (1,030 kg)
- Max takeoff weight: 3,725 lb (1,690 kg)
- Fuel capacity: 120 US gal (100 imp gal; 450 L) (with tip tanks)
- Powerplant: 2 × Lycoming IO-320-B1A air-cooled flat-four, 160 hp (120 kW) each
- Propellers: 2-bladed Hartzell HC-E2YL-27663-4, 6 ft 0 in (1.83 m) diameter (counter-rotating)

Performance

- Maximum speed: 205 mph (330 km/h, 178 kn)
- Cruise speed: 178 mph (286 km/h, 155 kn) (long range cruise)
- Stall speed: 70 mph (110 km/h, 61 kn) (flaps down, power off)
- Never exceed speed: 272 mph (438 km/h, 236 kn)
- Range: 1,200 mi (1,900 km, 1,000 nmi)
- Service ceiling: 20,000 ft (6,100 m)
- Rate of climb: 1,460 ft/min (7.4 m/s)
- Take-off run to 50ft (15m): 1,530 ft (470 m)
- Landing run from 50 ft (15 m): 1,870 ft (570 m)

== See also ==
Related development

- Piper PA-24 Comanche
