= Piper PA-40 Arapaho =

1973 Piper twin-engined, six-seat cabin aircraft

PA-40 Arapaho
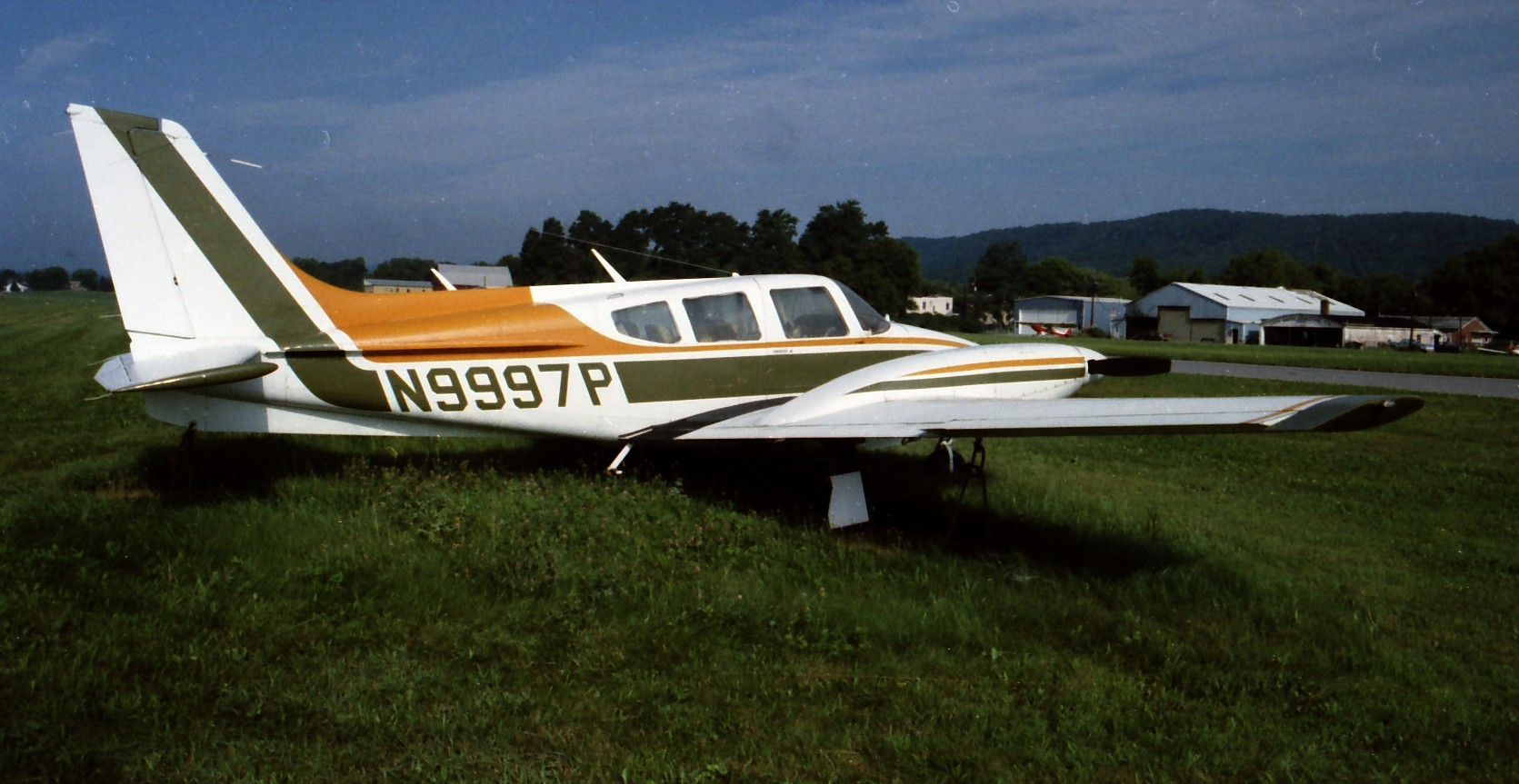

General information
- Type: Twin-engined cabin monoplane
- National origin: United States
- Manufacturer: Piper
- Status: Cancelled
- Number built: Three

History
- First flight: 16 January 1973
- Developed from: Piper PA-39 Twin Comanche

The Piper PA-40 Arapaho was an American twin-engined cabin monoplane designed by Piper as a replacement for the PA-39 Twin Comanche C/R.

Like most Piper products at this time, the PA-40 was named after a Native American tribe, in this case the Arapaho.

== Development ==
The Arapaho was similar in size to the Twin Comanche and had six seats but had a taller main landing gear and larger cabin windows. It had two counter-rotating 160 hp Lycoming IO-320 engines.

The prototype was damaged in June 1972 when the factory at Lock Haven, Pennsylvania, flooded and the prototype, registered N9999P, did not fly until 16 January 1973. It crashed on 21 September 1973 during spin trials. and the aircraft was redesigned with a taller tailfin. The second modified prototype with normally aspirated engines first flew in April 1974 and was followed by a third aircraft with turbocharged engines.

The PA-40 was type certified on 18 July 1974, as an amendment to the Twin Comanche type certificate. The Arapaho was scheduled to be launched as a 1975 model, but the company decided not to market the aircraft and the project was cancelled in December 1974. Piper stated that the cancellation was for financial reasons as it did not want to establish a new production line during the 1973–1975 recession.

Following cancellation the two aircraft were used by Piper as company liaison and communication aircraft, one based at Lock Haven, the other at Lakeland, Florida. Later, one aircraft was scrapped by Piper. The third, registered N9998P, was privately owned in Texas, following use by the Purdue University student maintenance program until August of 2026 when it was transferred to the Piper Aviation Museum in Lock Haven, PA.
