= Hazleton Regional Airport =

Public airport in Luzerne County, Pennsylvania

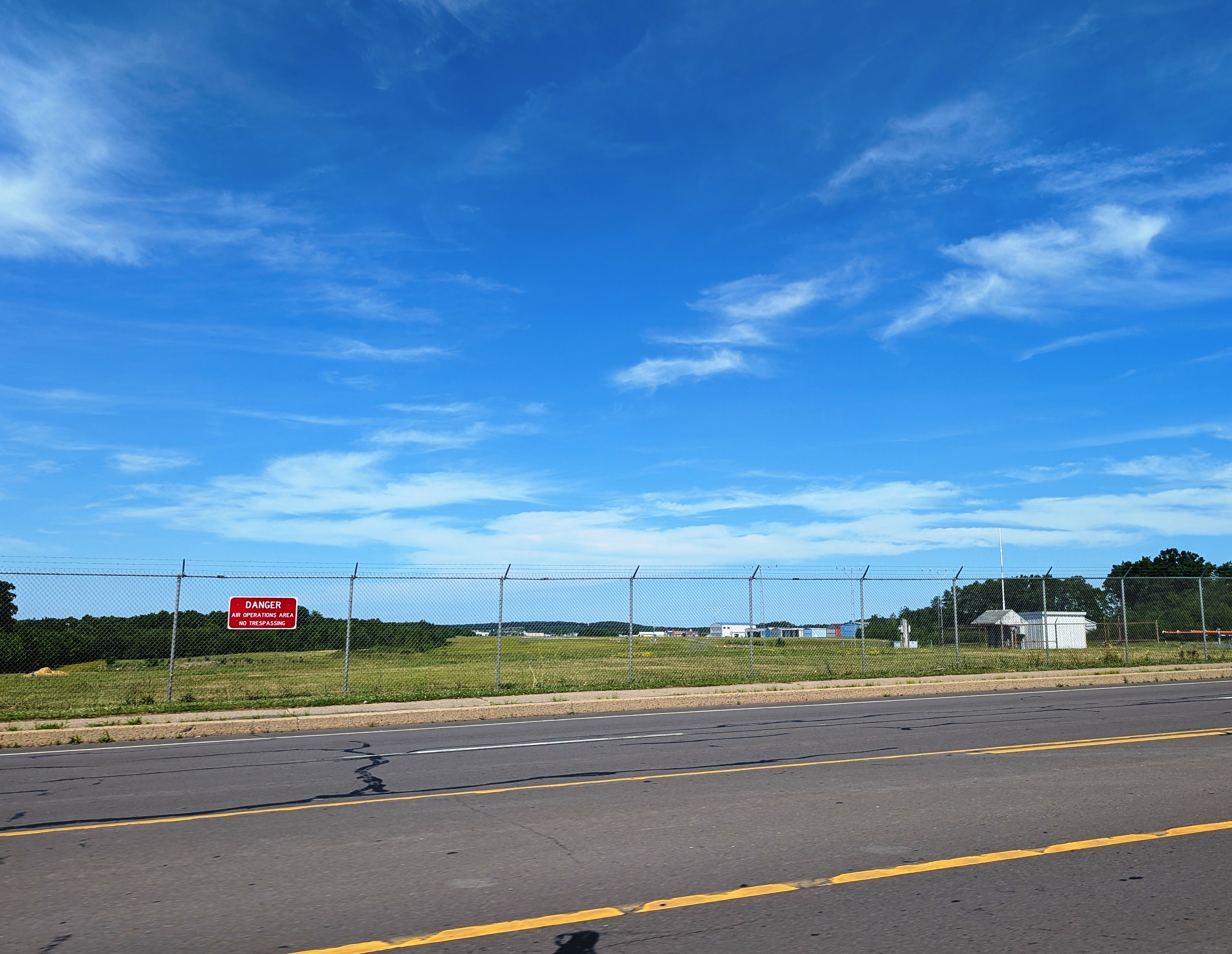
- Airport as seen from PA 309
- IATA: HZL; ICAO: KHZL; FAA LID: HZL

Summary
- Airport type: Public
- Owner: City of Hazleton
- Serves: Hazleton, Pennsylvania
- Elevation AMSL: 1,603 ft (489 m)
- Coordinates: 40°59′12″N 075°59′42″W
- Interactive map of Hazleton Regional Airport

Runways
Direction	Length		Surface
Direction	ft	m	Surface
10/28	4,898	1,493	Asphalt

Statistics (2008)
- Aircraft operations: 23,942
- Based aircraft: 42
- Source: Federal Aviation Administration

Hazleton Regional Airport (IATA: HZL, ICAO: KHZL, FAA LID: HZL) is a public airport two miles northwest of Hazleton, in Luzerne County, Pennsylvania.

The airport had Air Pennsylvania flights to Philadelphia; Allegheny Airlines stopped there from 1957 until Allegheny Commuter took over in 1968.

== Facilities ==
The airport covers 550 acres (220 ha) at an elevation of 1,603 feet (489 m). Its single runway, 10/28, is 4,898 by 100 feet (1,493 x 30 m) asphalt.

In the year ending October 21, 2008 the airport had 23,942 aircraft operations, average 65 per day: 99% general aviation and 1% military. 42 aircraft were then based at the airport: 86% single-engine, 2% multi-engine, 5% jet and 7% helicopter.

== See also ==
- List of airports in Pennsylvania
