= Piper PA-7 =

Two-seat light aircraft, USA 1944

PA-7 Skycoupe

General information
- Type: Light aircraft
- Manufacturer: Piper Aircraft
- Number built: 1

History
- First flight: 1944

The Piper PA-7 Skycoupe was a 1940s American two-seat light aircraft designed and built by Piper Aircraft at Lock Haven. Towards the end of 1944 Piper announced a number of aircraft it intended to build after the war. One of these was the PWA-1 Skycoupe (Post War Airplane 1). A prototype was built in 1943, it was a two-seat side-by-side low-wing cantilever monoplane with a twin-boom fuselage with a tricycle landing gear. It had a Franklin 4ACG-199-H3 engine driving a pusher propeller. In 1945 it was redesignated the PA-7 Skycoupe but no further examples were built.

== Specifications (PA-7) ==
General characteristics

- Crew: 2
- Wingspan: 30 ft 0 in (9.14 m)
- Gross weight: 1,597 lb (724 kg)
- Powerplant: 1 × Franklin 4ACG-199-H3 , 113 hp (84 kW)

Performance

- Maximum speed: 110 mph (180 km/h, 96 kn)
- Range: 400 mi (640 km, 350 nmi)
