= Piper PT-1 =

US two-seat primary training aircraft; 1942

PT-1 Trainer
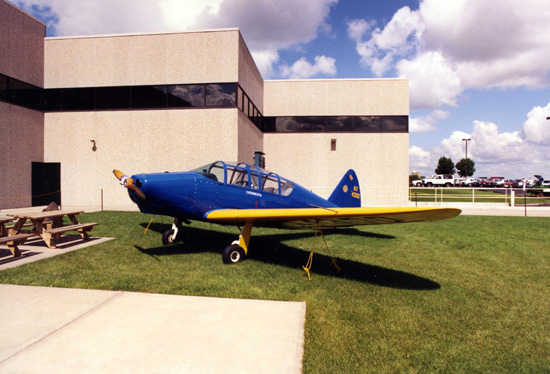

General information
- Type: Monoplane trainer
- Manufacturer: Piper Aircraft
- Number built: 1

History
- First flight: 1942

The Piper PT-1 is a 1940s American two-seat primary training monoplane designed and built by Piper Aircraft at Lock Haven. A low-wing tandem two-seat monoplane, the PT-1 was the first Piper aircraft to have a low-wing. It had a fabric covering over an all-metal fuselage frame and wooden spar wings and tail unit. The PT-1 had a retractable tailwheel landing gear and was powered by a 130 hp (97 kW) Franklin 6AC-2980D engine. No further aircraft were built. A four-seat development was designed as the Piper PWA-6 which did not go into production either.

== Specifications (PT-1) ==
Data from Jane's all the World's Aircraft 1947

General characteristics

- Crew: 2
- Length: 22 ft 8 in (6.9 m)
- Wingspan: 35 ft 2 in (10.72 m)
- Height: 6 ft 6 in (1.98 m)
- Empty weight: 1,325 lb (601 kg)
- Gross weight: 2,000 lb (907 kg)
- Powerplant: 1 × Franklin 6AC-298 6-cyl. air-cooled horizontally-opposed piston engine, 130 hp (97 kW)
- Propellers: 2-bladed fixed pitch wooden airscrew

Performance

- Maximum speed: 150 mph (240 km/h, 130 kn) plus
- Cruise speed: 135 mph (217 km/h, 117 kn) plus
- Landing speed: less than 50 mph (43 kn; 80 km/h)
- Range: 700 mi (1,100 km, 610 nmi)
- Service ceiling: 12,400 ft (3,800 m)
- Rate of climb: 750 ft/min (3.8 m/s) to 1,000 ft/min (300 m/min)

== See also ==
- I.Ae. 31 Colibrí
- IMPA Tu-Sa

Aircraft of comparable role, configuration, and era

- Aeronca Arrow
- Culver Cadet
- Globe GC-1 Swift
- Johnson Rocket 185

== Bibliography ==
- Auliard, Gilles (September–October 2001). ""Unknown Piper": Reviving the PT-1". Air Enthusiast. No. 95. pp. 12–13. ISSN 0143-5450.
- Peperell, Roger W.; Smith, Colin M. (1987). Piper Aircraft and their forerunners. London: Air-Britain (Historians). pp. 47–50. ISBN 0-85130-149-5.
- "Piper PT Trainer". Flying. Vol. 33, no. 1. July 1943. pp. 110, 119.
