= Globe GC-1 Swift =

American sport aircraft

GC-1 Swift
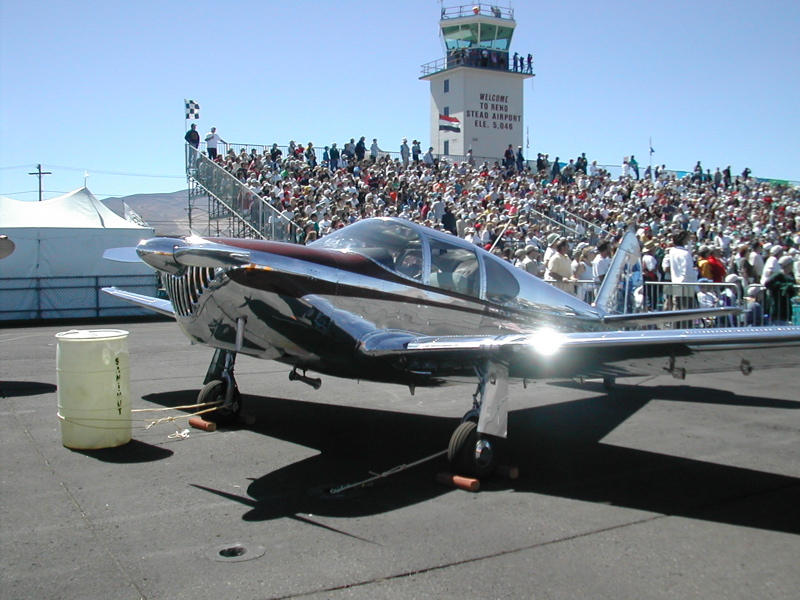
- Globe Swift

General information
- Type: Civil aircraft
- Manufacturer: Globe Aircraft/TEMCO
- Designer: R.S. Johnson
- Number built: 1,521 (including prototypes)

History
- Introduction date: 1946
- First flight: GC-1A Swift: 1942
- Developed from: Culver Cadet
- Variant: LoPresti Fury
- Developed into: T-35 Buckaroo

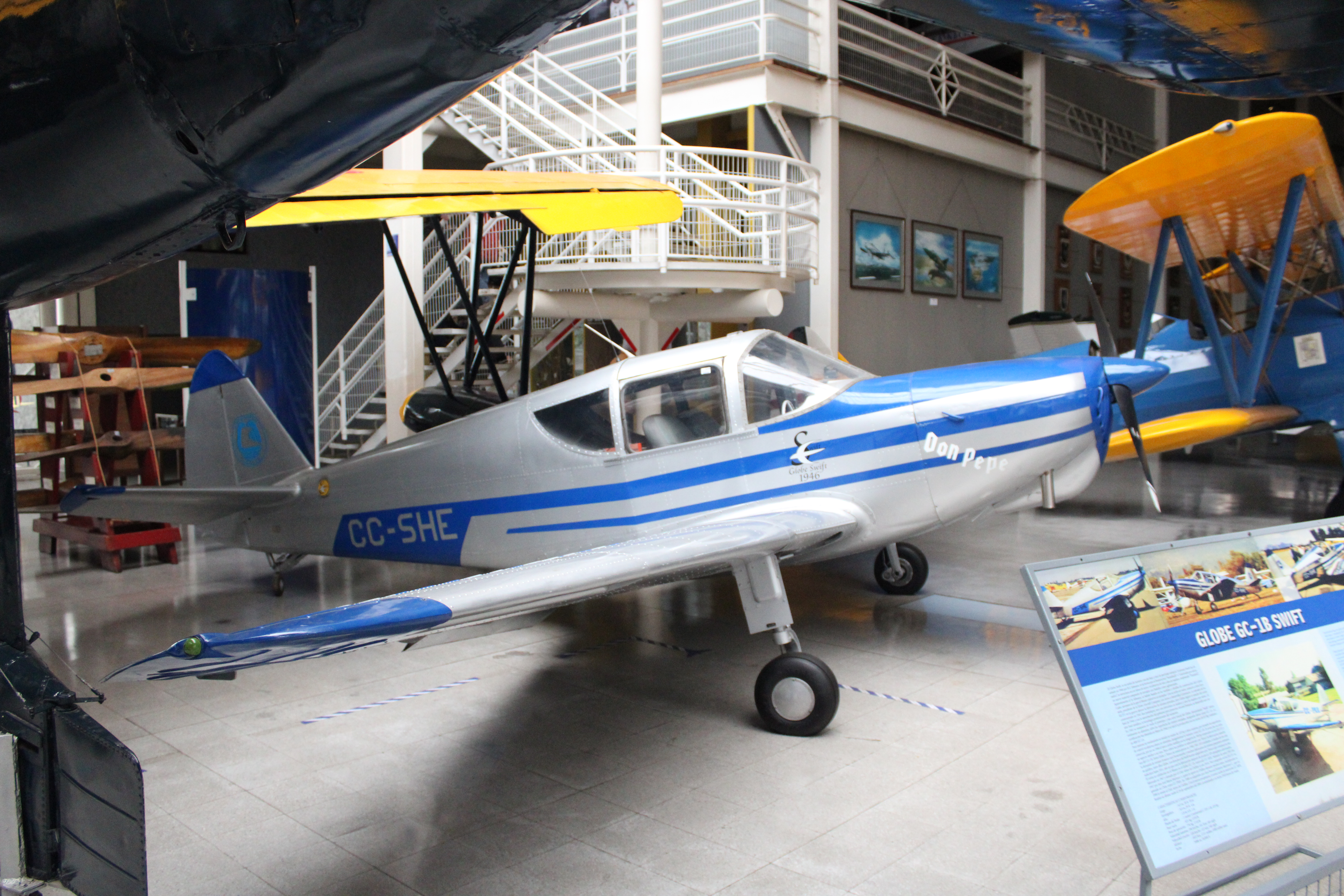
Globe GC-1B

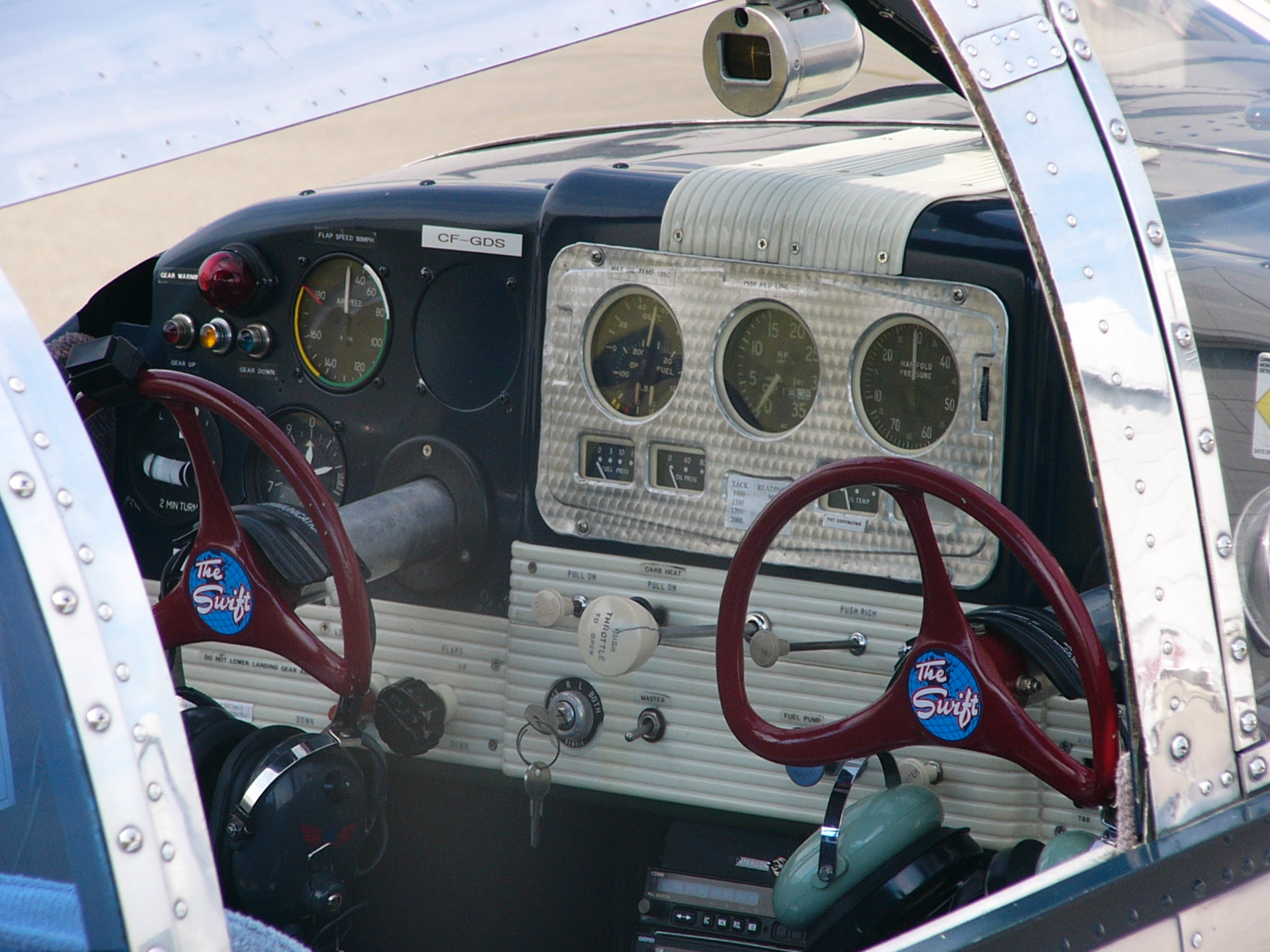
Swift instrument panel

The Globe GC-1 Swift, also known as the Globe/Temco Swift, is a light, two-seat, retractable conventional gear, sport monoplane from the post–World War II period.

== Design and development ==
The Swift was designed by R.S. "Pop" Johnson in 1940, despite the fanciful story which has now entered into popular mythology surrounding the Swift's origin (that a Culver Cadet was obtained as a "template" aircraft). The design was financially secured by John Kennedy, president of the Globe Medicine Company, to be built by his new Globe Aircraft Company. World War II interrupted their plans, however, and the 85 hp (63 kW) GC-1A Swift advertised as the "All Metal Swift" re-designed by K.H."Bud" Knox, received its type certificate on 7 May 1946. Two prototypes were built but essentially, the design remained the same as the type which entered production. Globe built about 408 GC-1As.

Later that year, the Swift received a more powerful engine of 125 hp (93 kW), making it the GC-1B. Globe, together with TEMCO, built 833 GC-1Bs in six months. Globe's production outpaced sales of the Swift; as a result Globe was forced into insolvency. TEMCO, the largest creditor, paid $328,000 to obtain the type certificate, tooling, aircraft, and parts allowing them to continue production in late 1947 hoping to recoup their losses. TEMCO built 260 more aircraft before ending Swift production in 1951.

The type certificate for the Swift was obtained by Universal Aircraft Industries (later Univair) along with all production tooling. Spare parts continued to be built until 1979 when the Swift Museum Foundation under the leadership of President Charlie Nelson purchased the Type Certificate, parts and tooling.

== Operational history ==
The most unusual variant of the series became a separate design, the TEMCO TE-1 Buckaroo which was built in a short-run first as a contender for a USAF trainer aircraft contract, and was later transferred to foreign service as a military trainer. Several of these trainers have since returned to the civil market.

== Accidents and incidents ==
- On June 28, 1952, a privately operated Temco Swift, aircraft registration N3858K, collided with American Airlines Flight 910, Douglas DC-6 N90750, over Dallas while both aircraft were on final approach to Dallas Love Field. The collision and ensuing crash killed both occupants of the Swift; the DC-6 landed safely with minor damage and no injuries to the 55 passengers and five crew. The accident was attributed to the Swift pilot's failure to follow visual flight rules and exercise prudence during the landing approach. A contributing factor was air traffic control error.

== Specifications (GC-1B) ==
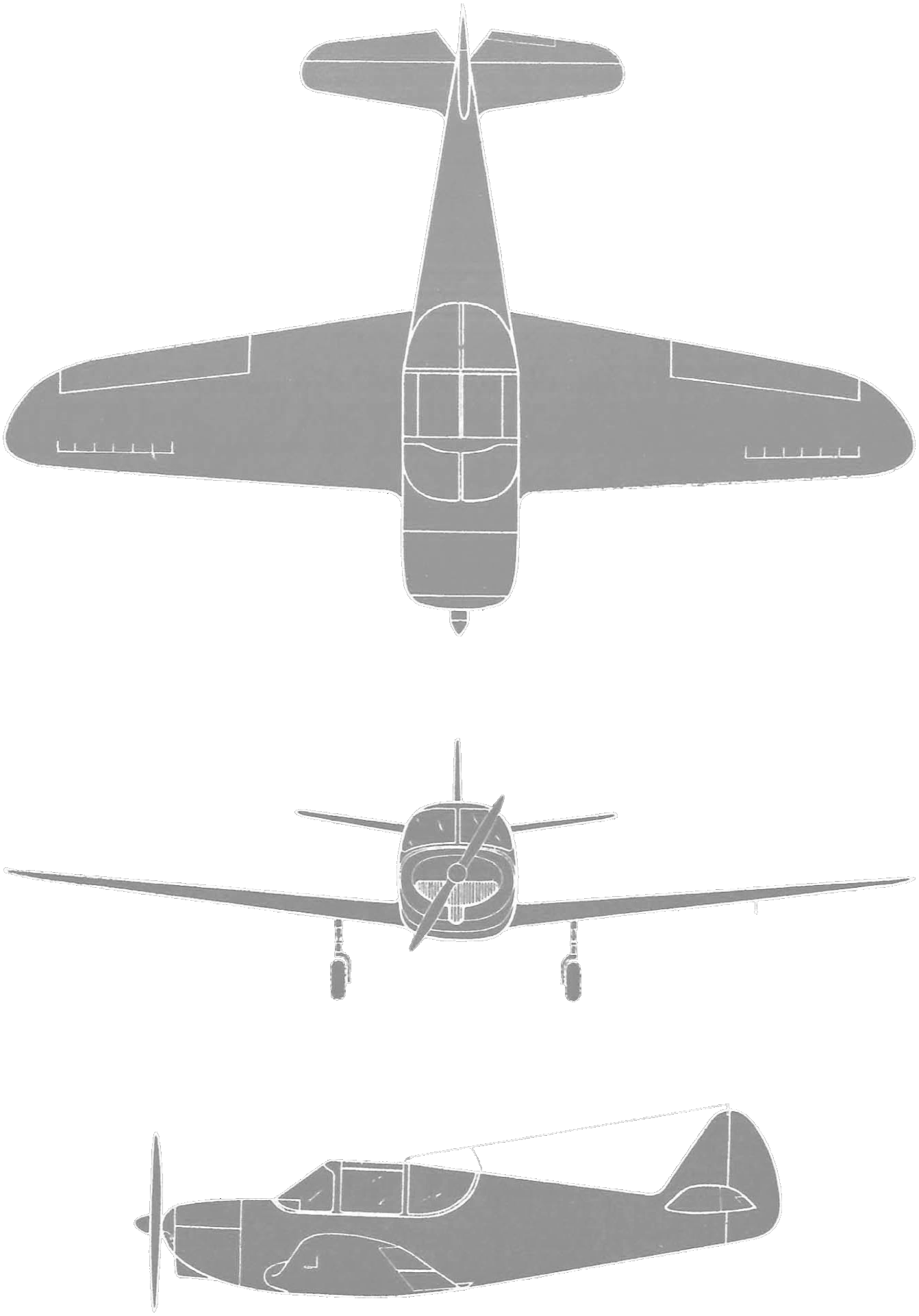
3-view silhouette drawing of the Globe GC-1A Swift

Data from Jane's All the World's Aircraft 1948

General characteristics

- Crew: one
- Capacity: one passenger
- Length: 20 ft 10 in (6.35 m)
- Wingspan: 29 ft 4 in (8.94 m)
- Height: 6 ft 2 in (1.88 m)
- Wing area: 131.63 sq ft (12.229 m^{2})
- Airfoil: Root NACA 23015, Tip NACA 23009
- Empty weight: 1,125 lb (510 kg)
- Gross weight: 1,710 lb (776 kg)
- Fuel capacity: 26 US gal (22 imp gal; 98 L)
- Powerplant: 1 × Continental C125 six cylinder, four-stroke aircraft engine, 125 hp (93 kW)

Performance

- Maximum speed: 130 kn (150 mph, 240 km/h) at sea level
- Cruise speed: 120 kn (140 mph, 230 km/h)
- Stall speed: 37 kn (43 mph, 69 km/h) (with flaps)
- Never exceed speed: 161 kn (185 mph, 298 km/h)
- Range: 360 nmi (420 mi, 680 km)
- Service ceiling: 16,000 ft (4,900 m)
- Rate of climb: 1,000 ft/min (5.1 m/s)

== See also ==
Aircraft of comparable role, configuration, and era

- Aeronca Arrow
- Culver Cadet
- Harlow PJC-2
- Johnson Rocket 185
- Piper PT-1
- Spartan Executive
