= Ohio History of Flight Museum =

- Location within Ohio
- Established: 1981
- Dissolved: 1 June 2000
- Location: Columbus, Ohio
- Coordinates: 40.0000°N 82.8924°W
- Type: Aviation museum
- Founder: Foster Lane
- Website: ohioflight.org (Archived)

The Ohio History of Flight Museum was an aviation museum located at the Port Columbus International Airport in Columbus, Ohio.

== History ==
=== Background ===
Foster Lane began flying in the late-1920s with a Waco 9 that his parents had purchased for him. Years later, after establishing the Port Columbus Flying School, Lane located the airplane and restored it.

=== Establishment ===
The organization was established in 1981 with the display of a 1911 Headless Pusher at Port Columbus International Airport. The following year, Lane announced plans to build a 28,500 sq ft (2,650 m^{2}) museum. Restoration on the aircraft was begun in 1983 and the museum building was completed in 1984.

A Sud Aviation Caravelle VI-R was donated to the museum by Airborne Express in 1985. In 1991, an extension was opened to the public. Lane died in 1995. A glider that was on its way to be donated to the museum was destroyed in a fatal crash in 1997.

=== Closure ===
The museum was forced to close on 1 June 2000 as the airport wanted to build a hotel on its property and the collection was donated to the Ohio Historical Society. A proposal by members of the Experimental Aircraft Association to build a new museum at Don Scott Field using the collection was made in 2002. However, it never came to fruition. It was initially moved to a 6,000 sq ft (560 m^{2}) warehouse at the airport, but after plans for new museum on the Ohio History Center campus also failed, it was split up in 2010 due to an increase in rent. Parts of the collection went to various museums in Ohio, while the remainder stayed with the society.

== Collection ==
- Aeronca C-2
- Alliance A-1 Argo
- Bede BD-5J
- Bensen B-8M
- Bleriot XI – 3/4 scale replica
- Culver Cadet
- Curtiss Model D
- Curtiss-Wright CW-1 Junior
- Dart G
- de Havilland DH-4
- Goodyear GA-33 Inflatoplane
- Heath Super Parasol
- Piper J3C Cub
- Rutan Long-EZ
- Smith Termite
- Sud Aviation Caravelle VI-R
- Superior Satellite
- Taylor E-2 Cub
- Waco 9
- Waco 10
- Wright Model G Aeroboat – replica
