= PQ-14 =

PQ 14 can refer to:

- Convoy PQ 14, an Arctic convoy of the Second World War
- Culver PQ-14, an American light aircraft of the 1940s
