= KLHQ =

KLHQ may refer to:

- KLHQ (FM), a radio station (99.5 FM) licensed to serve Hotchkiss, Colorado, United States
- Fairfield County Airport (Ohio) (ICAO code KLHQ)
