= PQ-15 =

PQ 15 can refer to:

- Convoy PQ 15, an Arctic convoy of the Second World War
- Culver XPQ-15, an American light aircraft of the 1940s
