= Culver PQ-14 Cadet =

US army aircraft

PQ-14
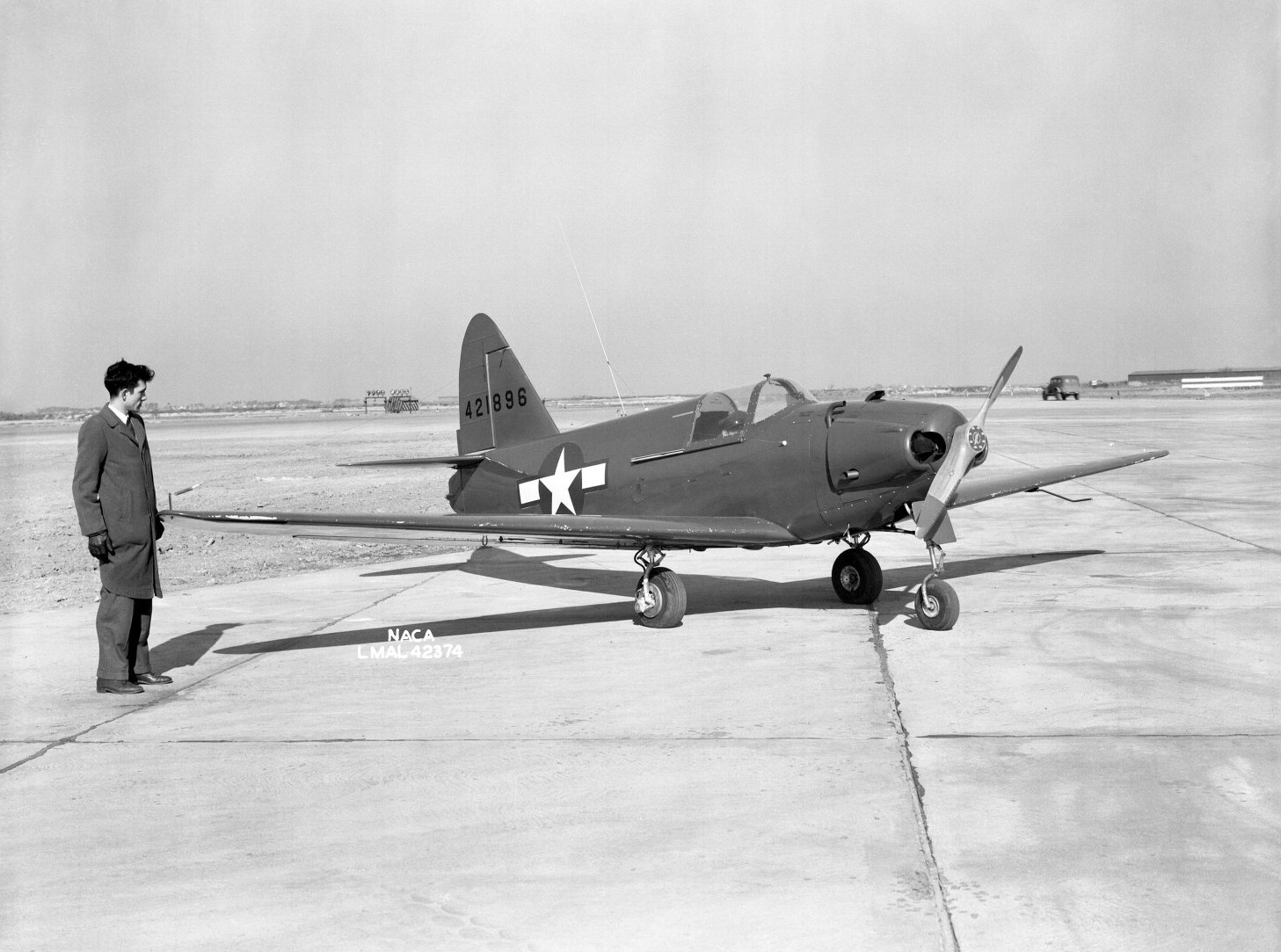
- Culver PQ-14B at Langley, 1945

General information
- Type: Target drone
- Manufacturer: Culver Aircraft Company
- Designer: Albert Mooney
- Primary users: U.S. Army Air Corps United States Navy; U.S. Army Air Force; United States Air Force
- Number built: 2,043

History
- Introduction date: 1942
- Retired: 1950
- Developed from: Culver PQ-8

The Culver PQ-14 Cadet is a modified version of the Culver LFA Cadet used as a target drone.

In 1940, the U.S. Army Air Corps drew up a requirement for a radio-controlled target drone for training anti-aircraft artillery gunners. The first aircraft in a series of target drones was a modification of the Culver LFA Cadet which eventually led to the PQ-14 series used throughout World War II and beyond.

== Design and development ==
Culver proposed a modification of its civilian Model LFA Cadet which the Army purchased as the PQ-8. The success of the PQ-8 led to the development of the "NRD"; a single PQ-8 was converted to the new configuration and tested by the USAAF as the XPQ-14. Larger and faster than the PQ-8, the PQ-14 also had retractable landing gear and fuselage, wings and tail components made of wood with stressed plywood skin.

This prototype was followed by YPQ-14A service test aircraft and 1,348 PQ-14A production models. Of the latter, 1,198 were transferred to the US Navy, which designated them as TD2C-1 with the decidedly unattractive name Turkey.

The YPQ-14B was a slightly heavier variant; a total of 25 were produced before production shifted to the PQ-14B. A total of 594 PQ-14Bs served as target drones for the USAAF. A single PQ-14B was converted to use an O-300-9 engine and designated XPQ-14C. After World War II, the Culver company developed the XPQ-15 from their Model V light aircraft. After only four were delivered the company went bankrupt in 1946.

== Operational history ==
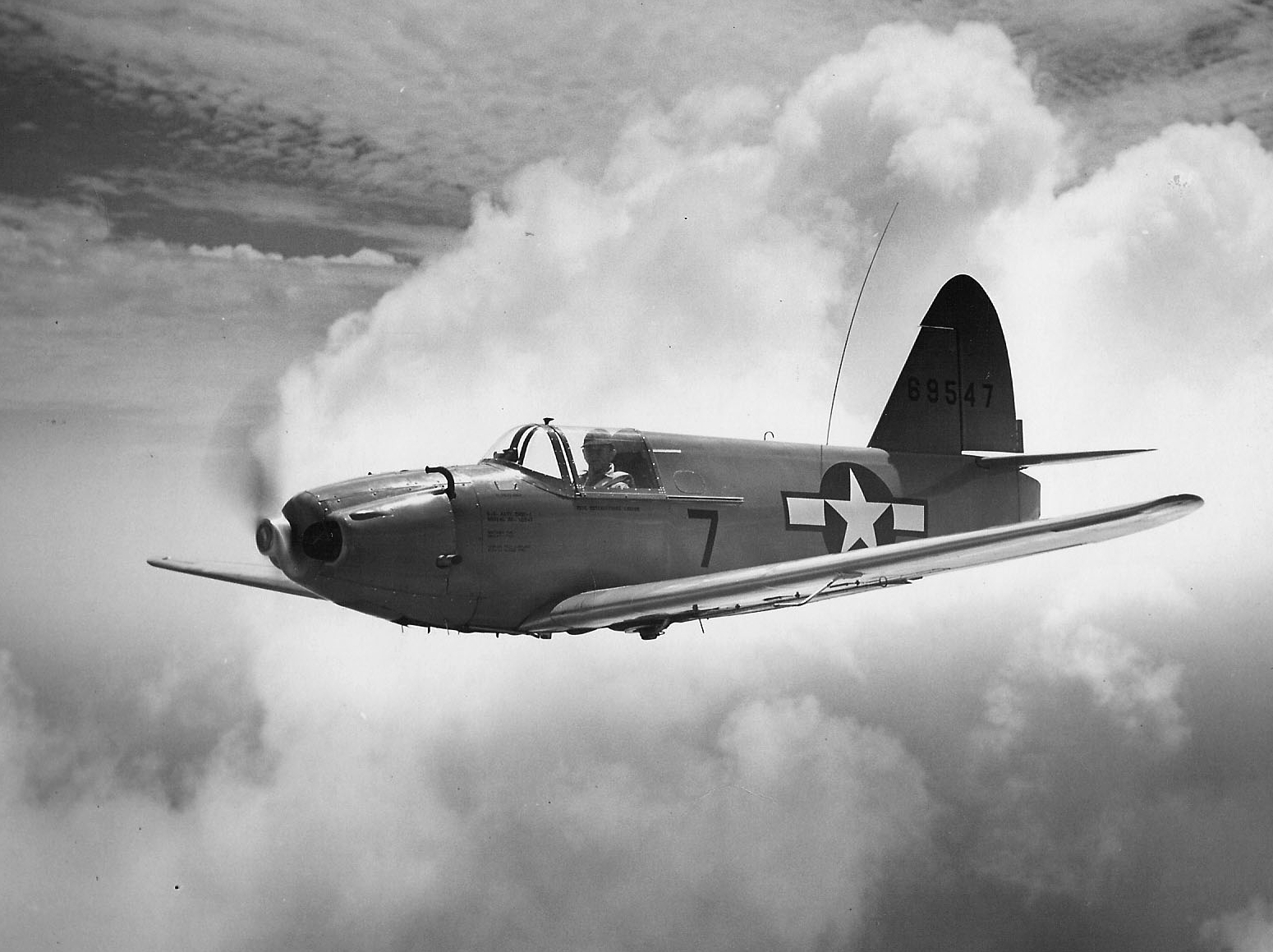
A U.S. Navy TD2C-1 in flight, circa 1945.

The XPQ-14 was first flown in 1942 and began to be received in training units shortly after. The aircraft was flown unmanned, controlled by radio, but was flown by a pilot for ferry flights, using a rudimentary control panel installed for that purpose and using their parachutes as a seat. Docile and easy to fly, the aircraft was finished in a bright red target color scheme although operationally, a silver or red finish was applied. Without a pilot they were flown from a "mother ship" aircraft. The typical mother ship was a Beech C-45. Despite their short lifespan, the aircraft performed well and the Franklin engine was considered "trouble-free". Most of the Culver target aircraft were "blasted out of the sky" by Army anti-aircraft gunners but a dozen or more survived and were surplused after 1950. Flown as a recreational aircraft, their new owners found that the aircraft had a sprightly performance.

== Surviving aircraft ==
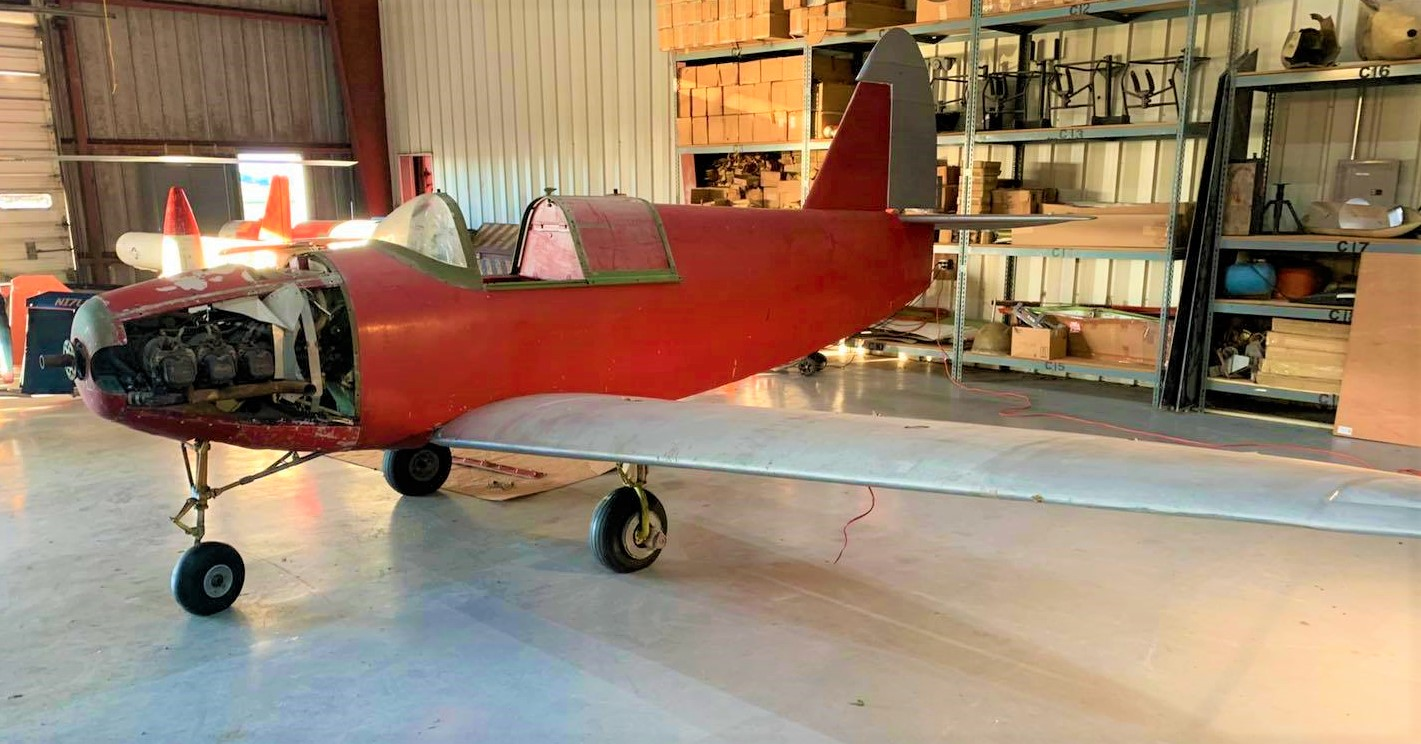
A PQ-14 under restoration at the Aviation Unmanned Vehicle Museum

- 44-21895 – PQ-14B airworthy at the Planes of Fame Air Museum in Chino, California.
- 44-68334 – PQ-14B on display at the EAA Aviation Museum in Oshkosh, Wisconsin.
- 44-68462 – PQ-14B in storage at the National Museum of the United States Air Force in Dayton, Ohio.
- 45-59043 – TD2C-1 airworthy with Russ Cronk of Big Bear, California.
- 120035 – TD2C-1 in storage at the Paul E. Garber Preservation, Restoration, and Storage Facility of the National Air and Space Museum in Suitland, Maryland.
- N917 – PQ-14B airworthy at the Airpower Museum in Blakesburg, Iowa.
- PQ-14 under restoration at the Aviation Unmanned Vehicle Museum in Caddo Mills, Texas.
- PQ-14B airworthy with Robert F. Holwey of Colorado Springs, Colorado.

== Specifications (Culver PQ-14A) ==
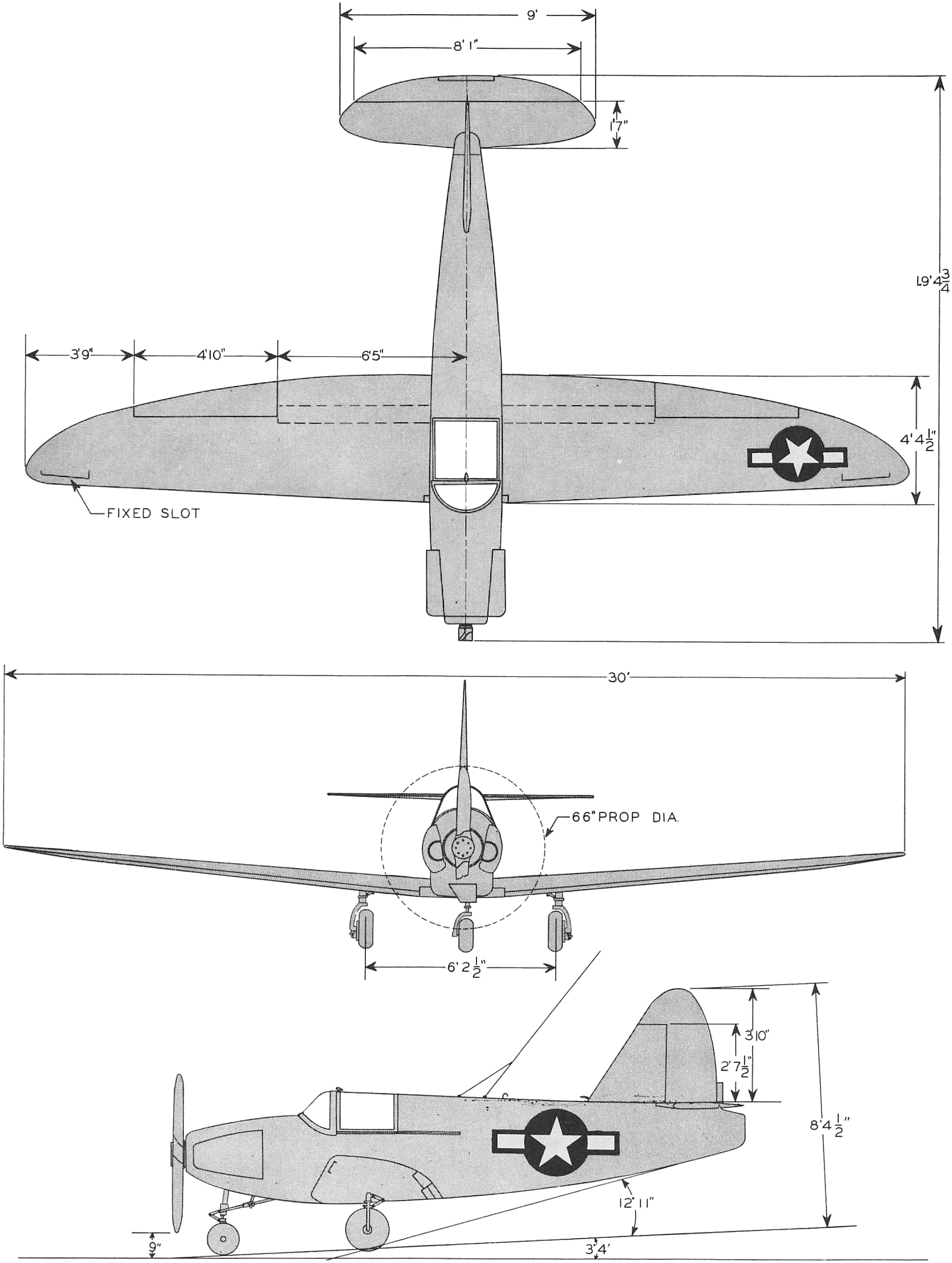
3-view line drawing of the Culver PQ-14

Data from Mormillo.

General characteristics

- Crew: One
- Length: 19 ft 6 in (5.94 m)
- Wingspan: 30 ft 0 in (9.14 m)
- Height: 8 ft 4.5 in (2.55 m)
- Gross weight: 1,830 lb (830 kg)
- Powerplant: 1 × Franklin 6ACT-298-35 6-cyl. air-cooled horizontally-opposed piston engine , 150 hp (97 kW)

Performance

- Maximum speed: 185 mph (300 km/h, 161 kn)
- Cruise speed: 150 mph (241 km/h, 130 kn)
- Range: 512 mi (823 km, 445 nmi)
- Service ceiling: 17,000 ft (5,200 m)

== See also ==
Related development

- Culver PQ-8/Cadet
