= Culver PQ-10 =

PQ-10
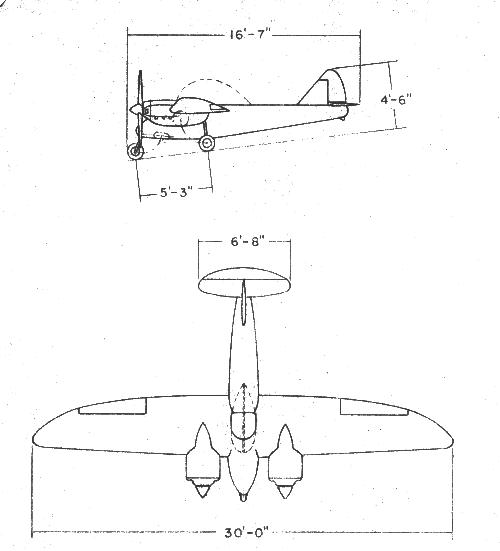

General information
- Type: Target drone
- National origin: Culver Aircraft Company
- Primary user: United States Army Air Forces
- Number built: 0

History
- Developed from: Culver Model MR

The Culver PQ-10 was an American target drone, designed by the Culver Aircraft Company for use by the United States Army Air Forces. Designed in 1941, the project was cancelled before any aircraft flew.

== Design and development ==
The prototype XPQ-10 was ordered by the United States Army Air Forces in 1941. Derived from the civilian Culver Model MR, the XPQ-10 was a high-wing monoplane equipped with twin Franklin O-300 engines and a fixed tricycle landing gear. Plans were made for the production of PQ-10 series aircraft; however, before the XPQ-10 was completed, the project was cancelled.

== Specifications (XPQ-10) ==
Data from Parsch

General characteristics

- Crew: 1 (Optional)
- Length: 16 ft 7 in (5.05 m)
- Wingspan: 30 ft (9.1 m)
- Height: 4 ft 6 in (1.37 m)
- Powerplant: 2 × Franklin O-300 opposed piston engines, 175 hp (130 kW) each

== See also ==
Aircraft of comparable role, configuration, and era

- Naval Aircraft Factory TDN

Related lists

- List of unmanned aerial vehicles
