= Franklin O-300 =

Early 1940s American air-cooled aircraft engine

O-300/6AC-298
- Type: Piston aircraft engine
- National origin: United States
- Manufacturer: Franklin Engine Company
- First run: 1941

The Franklin O-300 (company designation 6AC-298) was an American air-cooled aircraft engine of the early 1940s. The engine was of six-cylinder, horizontally-opposed layout and displaced 300 cu in (5 L). The power output ranged between 130 hp (97 kW) and 175 hp (130 kW) depending on variant. The 6ACG-298 featured a geared propeller drive.

An enlarged displacement version was known as the O-315, 6A3 or 6AL-315.

== Variants ==
=== O-300 ===
6AC-298
6AC-298-F3 (O-300-1)
130 hp (97 kW) at 2,600 rpm

6ACT-298
150 hp (112 kW) at 3,000 rpm
6ACT-298-J4 (O-300-3)
150 hp (112 kW) at 2,930 rpm
6ACT-298-35 (O-300-11)
150 hp (112 kW) at 2,930 rpm

6ACG-298-P5 (O-300-9)
Geared propeller drive 0.63:1, 160 hp (119 kW) at 3,200 rpm

6ACTS-298
Supercharged, 160 hp (119 kW) at 3,200 rpm
6ACTS-298-K4 (O-300-7)
Supercharged, 175 hp (130 kW) at 3,000 rpm

6ACV-298
Vertical installation for helicopters,160 hp (119 kW) at 3,250 rpm

=== O-315 (6A3) ===
6AL-315
175 hp (130 kW)

6ALG-315
175 hp (130 kW)

== Applications ==
=== Direct drive ===
- Aeronautical Products A-1
- Aeronautical Products A-3
- CNNA HL-6
- Culver XPQ-9
- Culver XPQ-14, YPQ-14A, XPQ-15
- Bell 30
- Bellanca T-14
- Erco XPQ-13
- Fleetwings 33
- Hockaday Comet
- Piper PT-1
- Troy A
- Zodiac Libra-Det

=== Geared drive ===
- Culver PQ-14 Cadet
- Republic RC-1 Thunderbolt (O-315)

=== Supercharged ===
- Northwestern XPG-1 (Waco CG-4 twin-engine conversion)

== Specifications (6AC-298) ==
Data from

=== General characteristics ===
- Type: 6-cylinder air-cooled horizontally opposed aircraft piston engine
- Bore: 4.25 in (108 mm)
- Stroke: 3.5 in (88.9 mm)
- Displacement: 297.9 in³ (4.88 L)
- Dry weight: 260 lb (118 kg)

=== Components ===
- Cooling system: Air-cooled

=== Performance ===
- Power output: 130 hp (97 kW) at 2,600 rpm

== See also ==
Comparable engines

- Continental O-300

Related lists

- List of aircraft engines
