= 72nd Helicopter Squadron =

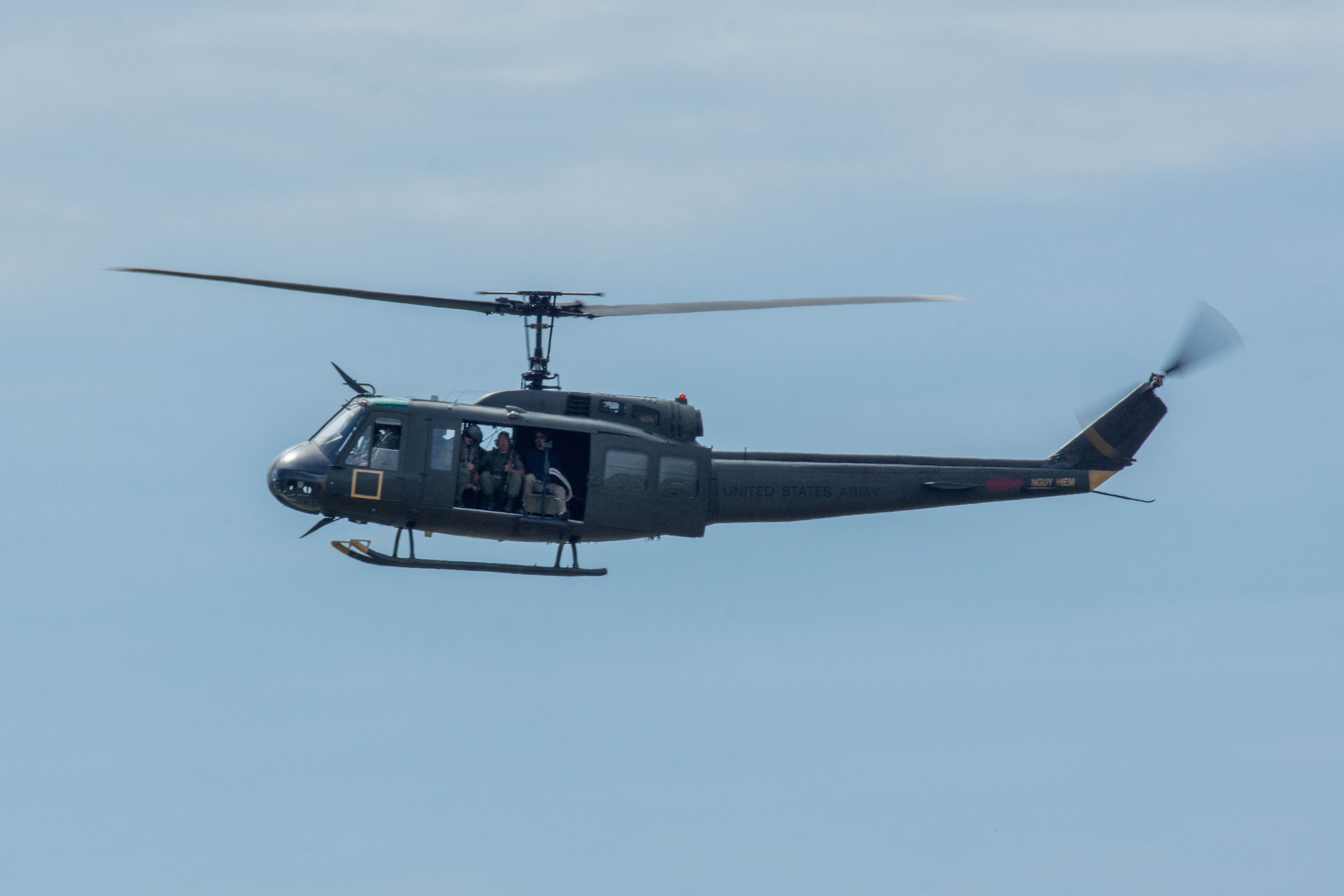
- UH-1 Huey as flown by the squadron
- Active: 1943–1946; 1946–1949; 1991–1995
- Country: United States
- Branch: United States Air Force
- Role: light transport, reconnaissance and search and rescue
- Engagements: European Theater of Operations; Mediterranean Theater of Operations
- Decorations: Army Meritorious Unit Commendation; Air Force Outstanding Unit Award

Insignia
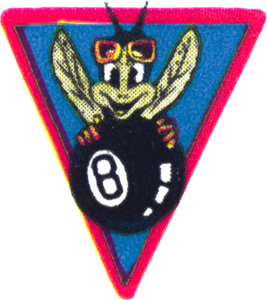
- 72d Liaison Sq emblem (Note: Approved 6 November 1943.)

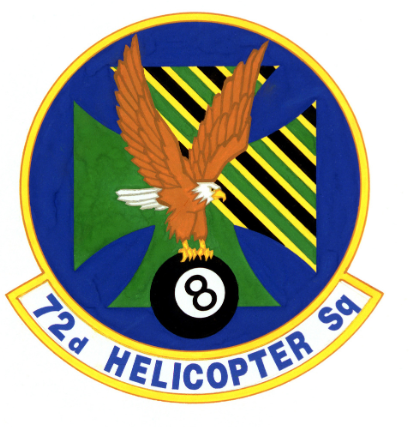
- 72d Helicopter Sq emblem (Note: Approved 19 July 1993)

The 72nd Helicopter Squadron is an inactive United States Air Force unit. It was last active as a flight, then as a squadron from 1991 to 1995 at Langley Air Force Base, Virginia, where it provided light transport and assisted with search and rescue operations.

The squadron was first activated as the 72nd Liaison Squadron. After training in the United States with various liaison aircraft, the unit initially deployed to North Africa but did not receive any aircraft until arriving in Italy in July 1944, mostly liaison and courier services for the Fifth Army. Two flights of the squadron were transferred to Southern France in August and attached to the Seventh Army. The 72nd eventually earned an Army Meritorious Unit Commendation for its wartime service. It briefly served in the occupation of Germany, before returning to the United States for inactivation. The squadron was again active from 1946 to 1949.

== History ==
=== World War II ===
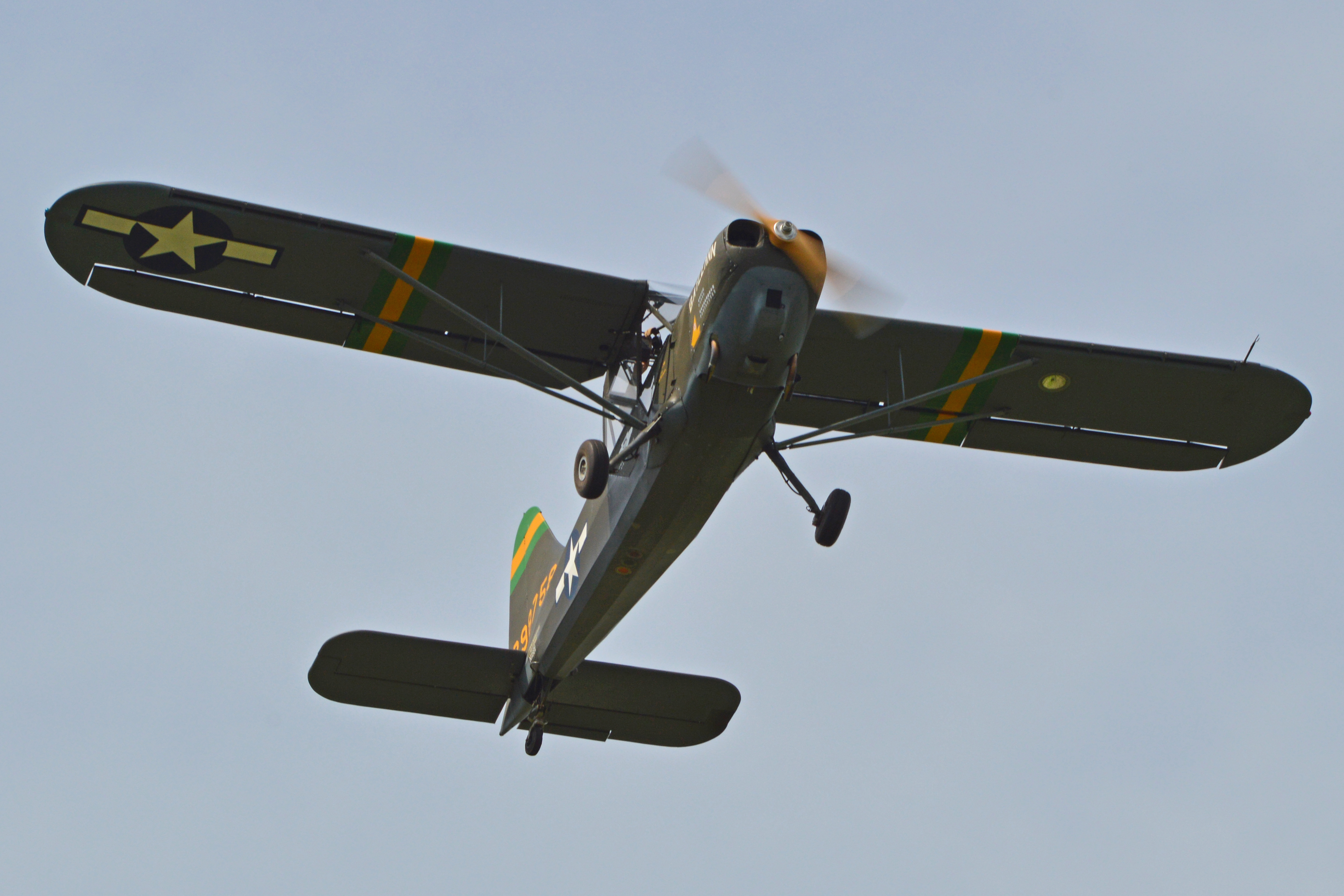
L-5 Sentinel, primary aircraft of the 72d Liaison Squadron

The squadron was first activated in April 1943 at New Cumberland Army Air Field, Pennsylvania, where it was assigned to the 26th Reconnaissance Group. Two months later, it moved to join the 26th at Reading Army Air Field, Pennsylvania. It was equipped with a variety of liaison aircraft, including the Stinson L-1 Vigilant, Piper L-4 Cub, Stinson L-5 Sentinel and Interstate L-6 Cadet. It was also assigned a few obsolete Douglas RA-24 Banshee dive bombers. In July, it moved to Camp Mackall Army Air Field, North Carolina, where it was soon reassigned to the I Air Support Command. The unit completed its training at several bases in the Southeastern United States. It then staged at Camp Patrick Henry and sailed from Norfolk, Virginia for the North African Theater of Operations aboard the USS General W. A. Mann (AP-112) in April 1944.

The squadron arrived in Oran, Algeria, its first station in the Mediterranean, on 14 June 1944. It re-equipped with L-5s and moved to Italy, where it began combat operations and preparation for Operation Dragoon, the invasion of southern France. The squadron moved to Saint-Tropez, France on 19 August 1944, five days after the initial amphibious assault. it moved north with Seventh Army, providing courier and light reconnaissance support. By V-E Day, the squadron was located in Augsburg Airfield, and briefly served with the occupation forces.

The squadron returned to the United States without personnel or equipment in August 1945, initially to the 3rd Air Force Assembly and Processing Station at Drew Field, Florida. In September, it moved to Muskogee Army Air Field, Oklahoma, where it began to be manned and equipped with L-5G aircraft. In November, it relocated to Marshall Field, Kansas, where it flew observation and visual reconnaissance missions for the Cavalry School. It moved to Brooks Field, Texas in October 1946 and was inactivated there in December.

=== Postwar operations ===
The squadron was again activated a few months later at Langley Field, Virginia, again equipped with the L-5 Sentinel. It also had detachments at other Tactical Air Command bases. The following year, it added the all metal Stinson L-13 and in 1948, operated the Sikorsky R-6 and Sikorsky H-5 helicopters. However, after 1948, it only operated Sentinels. The squadron was inactivated in April 1949

=== Helicopter operations ===
The squadron was redesignated the 72d Helicopter Flight and activated at Langley Air Force Base, Virginia on 1 November 1991, when it absorbed the personnel, and equipment of the 4401st Helicopter Flight, which had been activated at Langley on 15 March 1987. In October 1992, it was expanded to become the 72d Helicopter Squadron. The unit transported personnel and equipment and provided search and rescue assistance until inactivating in December 1995. It was awarded an Air Force Outstanding Unit Award for its performance between 1992 and 1994.

== Lineage ==
- Constituted as the 72d Liaison Squadron on 2 April 1943

Activated on 11 April 1943
Inactivated on 31 March 1945

- Activated on 3 October 1946

Inactivated on 1 April 1949

- Redesignated 72d Helicopter Flight

Activated 1 November 1991
Redesignated 72d Helicopter Squadron on 1 October 1992
Inactivated on 30 December 1995

=== Assignments ===
- 26th Reconnaissance Group, 11 April 1943
- I Air Support Command (later I Tactical Air Division, III Tactical Air Division), 11 August 1943
- Army Air Forces, Mediterranean Theater of Operations, c. 14 June 1944 (attached to Seventh Army)
- United States Strategic Air Forces, 1 November 1944 (attached to Seventh Army; Sixth Army Group, December 1944; Twelfth Army Group 15 December 1944)
- XII Tactical Air Command, 20 May 1945 (attached to Twelfth Army Group until 12 June 1945)
- United States Forces, European Theater, 3 July 1945
- Third Air Force, 4 August 1945
- XIX Tactical Air Command, 11 January 1946
- Tactical Air Command, 21 March 1946
- Ninth Air Force, 28–31 March 1946
- Ninth Air Force, 3 October 1946 – 1 April 1949 (attached to First Air Force, 15 January 1949 – 1 February 1949; 363d Tactical Reconnaissance Wing after 9 March 1949)
- 1st Operations Group, 1 November 1991 – 30 December 1995

=== Stations ===
- New Cumberland Army Air Field, Pennsylvania, 11 April 1943
- Reading Army Air Field, Pennsylvania, 7 June 1943
- Camp Mackall Army Air Field, North Carolina, 29 July 1943
- Knollwood Field, Tennessee, 13 September 1943
- Sky Harbor Airport, Tennessee, 18 October 1943
- Raleigh-Durham Army Air Field, North Carolina 27 February – 24 April 1944
- Oran, Algeria, 14 June 1944
- Santa Maria Airfield, Italy, 1 July 1944 (flight operated from Caserta Airfield, Italy c 38 July – c. 1 September 1944)
- Saint-Tropez, France 19 August 1944
- Brignoles, France, 21 August 1944
- Grenoble, France, 2 September 1944
- Lons-le-Saunier, France, 8 September 1944
- Vesoul, France, 18 September 1944
- Epinal, France, 30 September 1944
- Buhl, Bas-Rhin, France, 1 December 1944 (detachment at Strassbourg, France c. 8 December 1944 – 1 January 1945)
- Epinal, France, 2 January 1945
- Buhl, France, 11 March 1945
- Sarreguemines, France, 22 March 1945
- Kaiserslautern, Germany, 26 March 1945
- Darmstadt Airfield (Y-76), Germany, 1 April 1945
- Kitzingen Airfield (R-6), Germany, 13 April 1945
- Schwäbisch Gmünd, Germany 27 April 1945
- Augsburg Airfield (R-84), Germany, 2 May 1945
- Darmstadt Airfield (Y-76), Germany, June – c. 2 July 1945
- Drew Field, Florida, 4 August 1945
- Muskogee Army Air Field, Oklahoma, 1 September 1945
- Marshall Field, Kansas, 1 November 1945 – 31 March 1946
- Brooks Field, Texas, 3 October 1946
- Langley Field (later Langley Air Force Base), Virginia, 20 December 1946 – 1 April 1949
- Langley Air Force Base, Virginia, 1 November 1991 – 30 December 1995

=== Aircraft ===
- Stinson L-1 Vigilant, 1943–1944
- Piper L-4 Cub, 1943–1944
- Stinson L-5 Sentinel, 1943–1945, 1945–1946, 1946–1949
- Interstate L-6 Cadet, 1943–1944
- Douglas RA-24 Banshee, 1943–1944
- Stinson L-13, 1947–1948
- Sikorsky R-6, 1948
- Sikorsy H-5, 1948
- Bell UH-1 Huey, 1991–1995

=== Awards and campaigns ===
| Award streamer | Award | Dates | Notes |
|---|---|---|---|
| | Army Meritorious Unit Commendation | 15 August 1944 – 31 December 1944 | 72nd Liaison Squadron |
| | Air Force Outstanding Unit Award | 1 May 1992 – 30 April 1994. | 72nd Helicopter Flight (later 72nd Helicopter Squadron) |

| Campaign Streamer | Campaign | Dates | Notes |
|---|---|---|---|
| | Rome-Arno | 1 July 1944–9 September 1944 | 72nd Liaison Squadron |
| | Southern France | 15 August 1944–14 September 1944 | 72nd Liaison Squadron (with arrowhead device) |
| | Northern France | 25 July 1944–14 September 1944 | 72nd Liaison Squadron |
| | Rhineland | 15 September 1944–21 March 1945 | 72nd Liaison Squadron |
| | Ardennes-Alsace | 16 December 1944–25 January 1945 | 72nd Liaison Squadron |
| | Central Europe | 22 March 1944–21 May 1945 | 72nd Liaison Squadron |
