= Sikorsky R-6 =

Early helicopter

R-6 / Hoverfly II
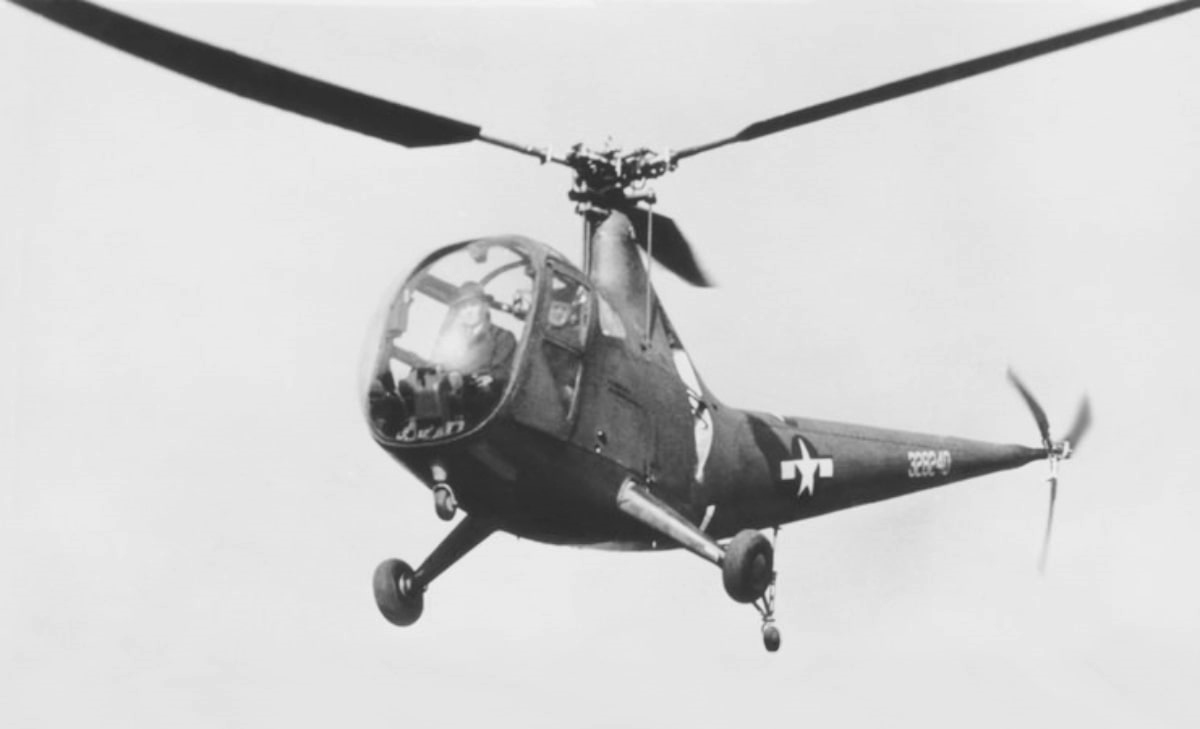
- R-6A Hoverfly II in flight

General information
- Type: Helicopter
- National origin: United States
- Manufacturer: Sikorsky Aircraft
- Status: Retired
- Primary users: United States Navy Royal Air Force
- Number built: 225

History
- Introduction date: 1945
- First flight: 15 October 1943
- Developed from: Sikorsky R-4

The Sikorsky R-6 is an American light two-seat helicopter of the 1940s. In Royal Air Force and Royal Navy service, it was named the Hoverfly II.

== Development ==
The R-6/Hoverfly II was developed to improve on the successful Sikorsky R-4. In order to enhance performance, a completely new streamlined fuselage was designed and the boom carrying the tail rotor was lengthened and straightened. The main rotor and transmission system of the R-4 were retained. Sikorsky allotted their Model 49 designation to the new design. Later, dynamically balanced modifications to the rotor were carried out by Doman Helicopters Inc. The new aircraft could attain 100 mph (160 km/h) compared with 82 mph (132 km/h) by the earlier design.

Initial production was by Sikorsky, but most examples were built by Nash-Kelvinator. Some of the later aircraft were fitted with more powerful engines.

== Operational history ==
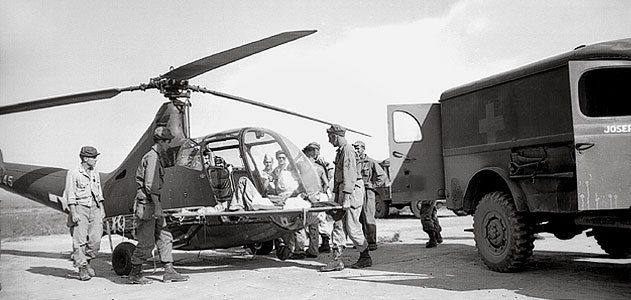
A Sikorsky R-6A transport ferries a wounded soldier from the battlefield during June 1945 in Luzon, Philippines.

The first R-6s were delivered to the United States Army Air Forces (USAAF) in late 1944 and some were transferred to the United States Navy (USN). It was initially intended to pass 150 R-6s to the Royal Air Force (RAF), but delays caused by the switch of production from Sikorsky's factory at Stratford, Connecticut, to Nash-Kelvinator at Detroit, Michigan, meant that only 27 R-6As were actually delivered to the RAF as the Hoverfly II. Fifteen of these were passed on to the Royal Navy's Fleet Air Arm (FAA).

Some of the RAF examples were allotted to 657 Squadron RAF for proving the use of helicopters in the Army Co-operation role, and two external stretchers could be fitted to the fuselage. 657 Squadron operated their Hoverfly IIs as Air Observation Posts, spotting for Army artillery units. The Hoverfly IIs remained in operation with the RAF until at least 1956 in the SAR role at RAF Leuchars, and one squadron example was displayed at the September 1950 Farnborough Air Show.

The FAA used their Hoverfly IIs in the training and liaison roles. Naval units to use the type included 771 Squadron from December 1945, followed by 705 Squadron.

The USAAF operated their R-6s in secondary roles and the survivors were redesignated H-6A in 1948. The USN examples were designated the HOS-1 and a further 64 were intended to be transferred from the USAAF, but this did not take place.

Disposals of surplus military S-49s were made in the civil market in the late 1940s but none now remain in operation. Four are currently displayed in US museums.

== Variants ==
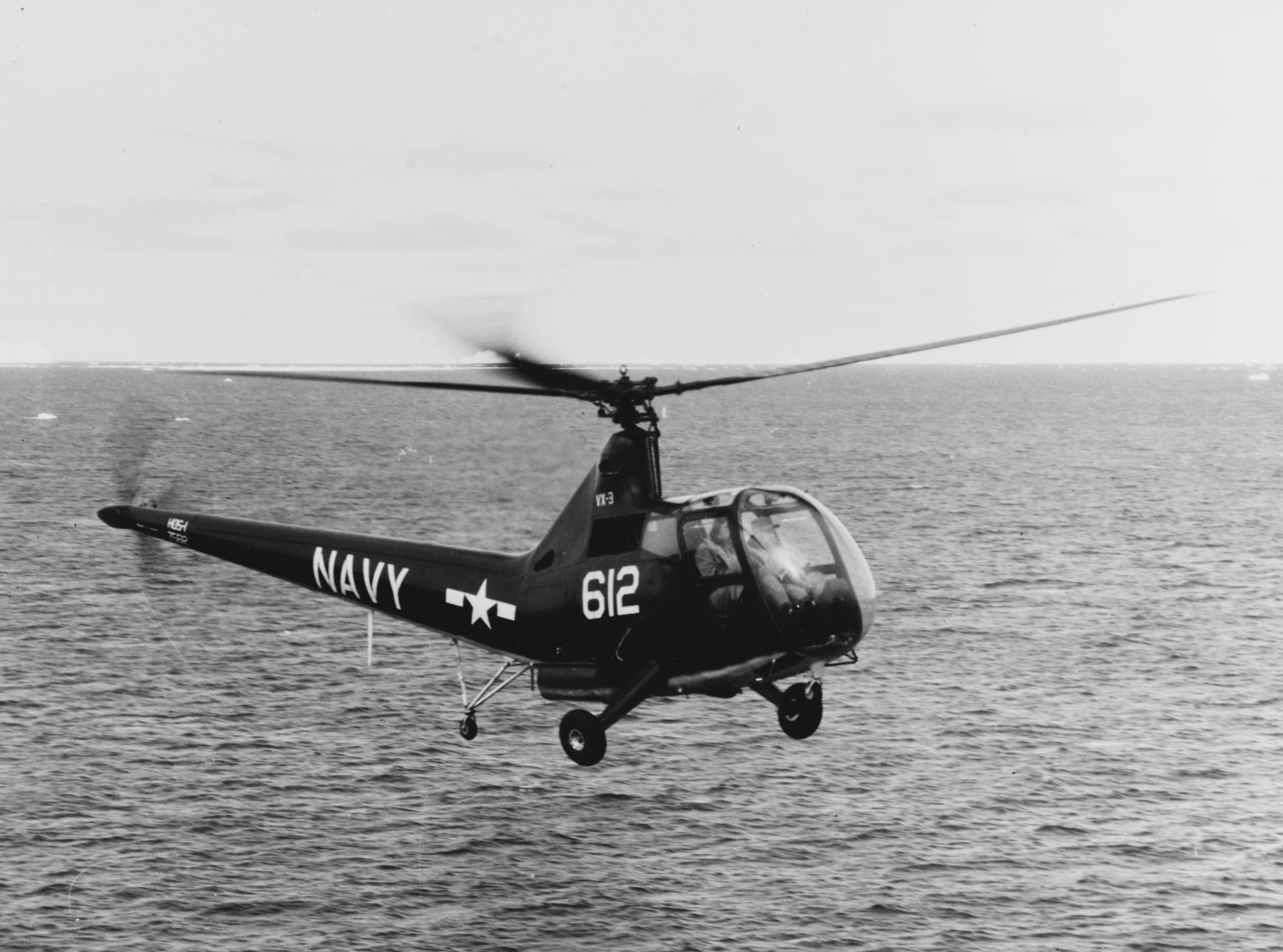
A U.S. Navy HOS-1 in January 1947

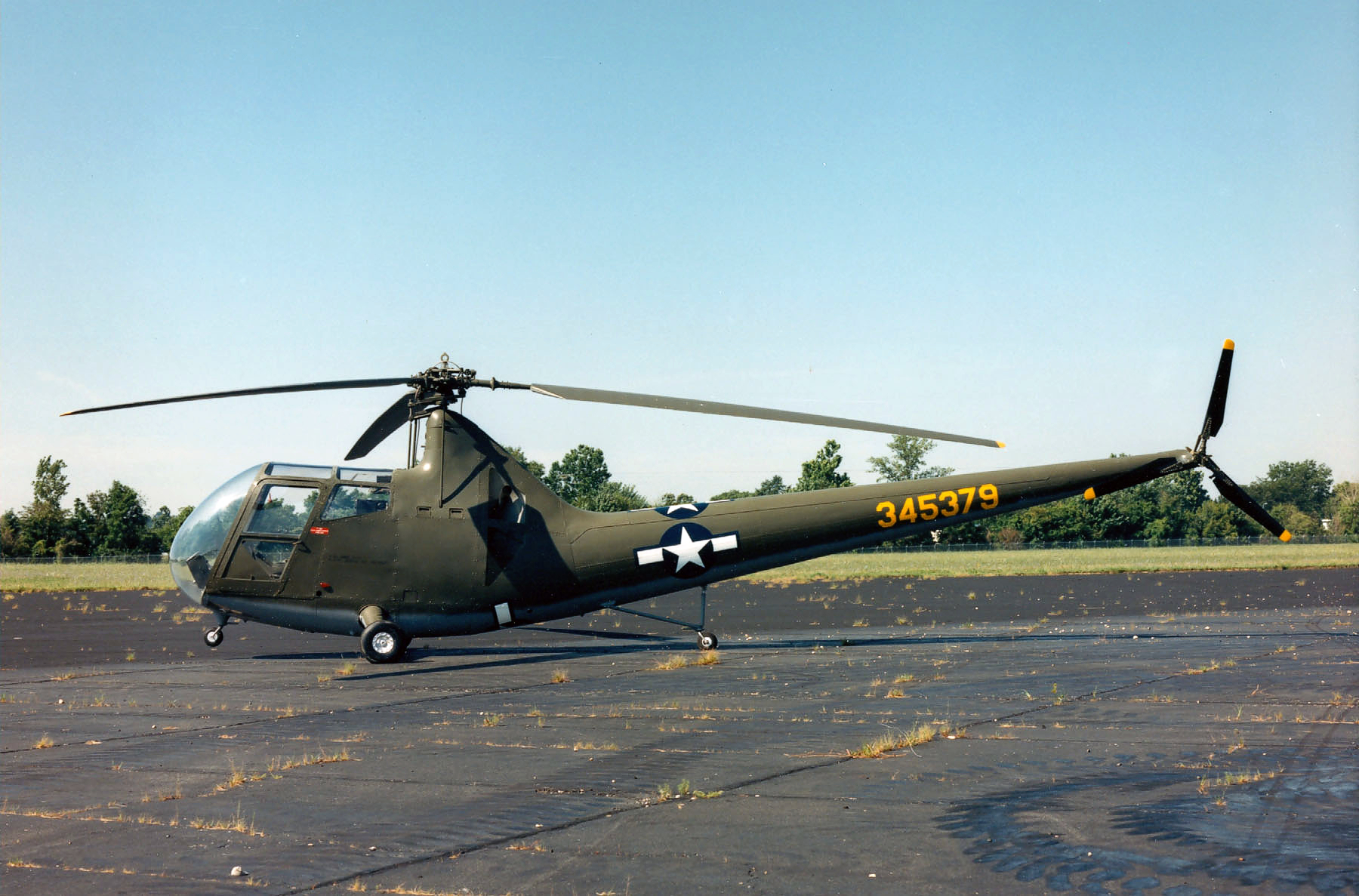
An R-6A Hoverfly II at the U.S. Air Force National Museum

XR-6
prototype powered by a 225 hp (168 kW) Lycoming O-435-7 (one)
XR-6A
as XR-6 but powered by the 240 hp (180 kW) Franklin O-405-9 (five) of which three to the US Navy as XHOS-1
YR-6A
as XR-6A with small changes (26) built by Nash-Kelvinator
R-6A
production model (193) built by Nash-Kelvinator of which 36 to US Navy as HOS-1 and 27 to the RAF as Hoverfly II
R-6B
projected variant with 225 hp (168 kW) Lycoming O-435-7, but not proceeded with
XR-7
projected development of the XR-6 with a 240 hp (180 kW) Franklin O-405-9 engine, not built.
Doman LZ-1
One R-6A modified as a testbed
Doman LZ-1A
One R-6A modified as a testbed with a Doman-designed hingeless rotor blades and self-lubricating rotor hub.

== Operators ==
United Kingdom

- Royal Air Force

United States

- United States Army Air Forces
  - 162nd Liaison Squadron
- United States Air Force
  - 72nd Liaison Squadron
- United States Coast Guard
- United States Navy

Mexico

- Mexican Air Force

== Surviving aircraft ==
- FAM-10 – R-6A on static display at the Mexican Air Force Museum in Zumpango, Mexico.
- 43-45473 – R-6A on static display at the United States Army Aviation Museum at Fort Novosel near Ozark, Alabama.
- 43-45379 – R-6A on static display at the National Museum of the United States Air Force in Dayton, Ohio.
- 43-45480 – LZ-1A on static display at the New England Air Museum in Windsor Locks, Connecticut. It was converted by Doman from the R-6.
- 43-45531 – R-6 (HOS-1) on display at the American Helicopter Museum and Education Center in West Chester, Pennsylvania.
- 75621 – HOS-1 in storage with Scroggins Aviation in Las Vegas, Nevada.

== Specifications (R-6A) ==
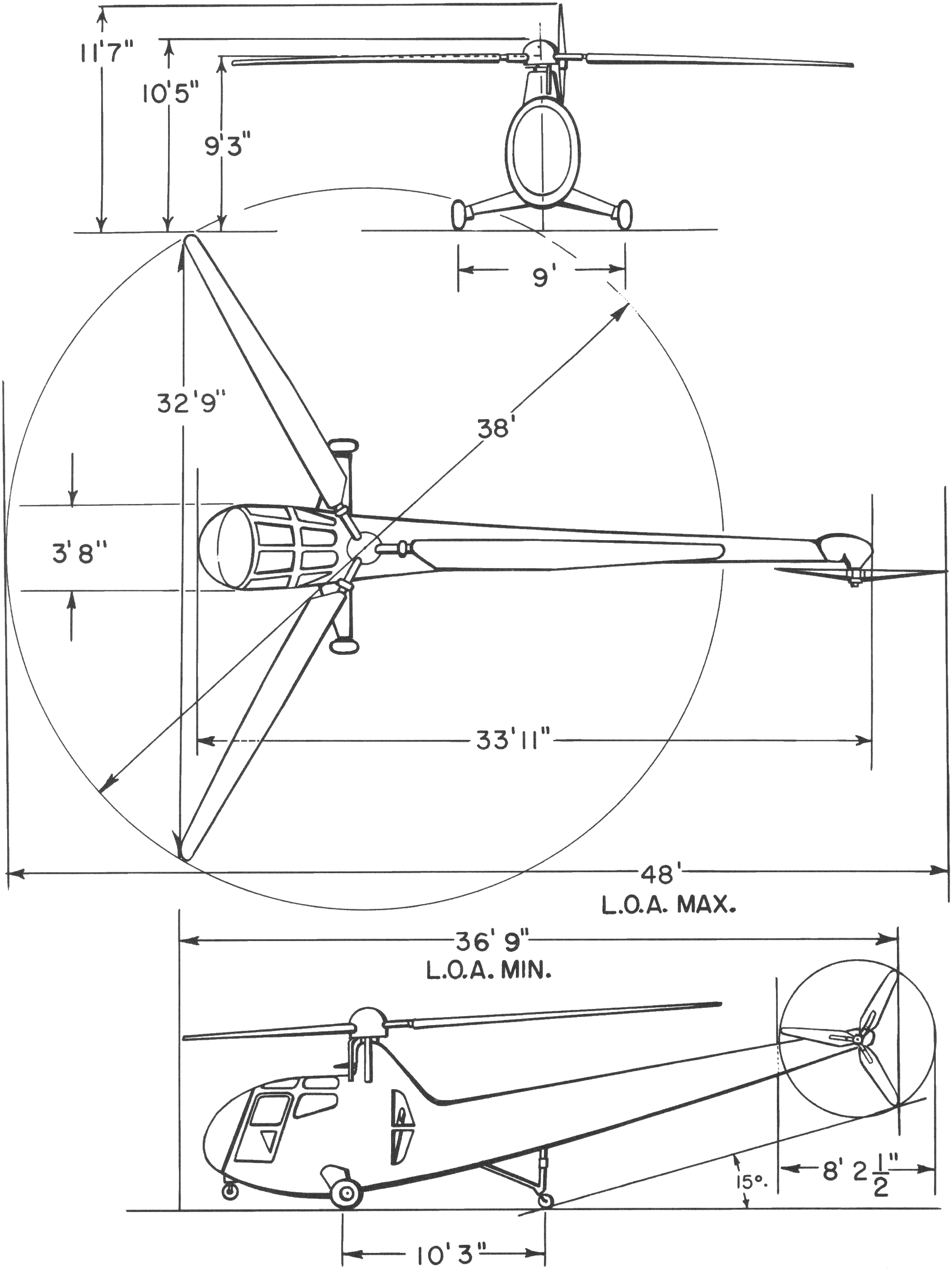
3-view drawing of the Sikorsky H-6A

Data from Thetford, 1977

General characteristics

- Crew: 1
- Capacity: 1 observer
- Length: 47 ft 11 in (14.61 m)
- Gross weight: 2,600 lb (1,179 kg)
- Powerplant: 1 × Franklin O-405-9 piston, 240 hp (180 kW)
- Main rotor diameter: 38 ft 0 in (11.58 m)

Performance

- Maximum speed: 100 mph (160 km/h, 87 kn)
- Service ceiling: 10,000 ft (3,000 m)

== See also ==
Related development

- Sikorsky R-4
