= Franklin O-405 =

O-405/6AC-403
- Type: Piston aircraft engine
- National origin: United States
- Manufacturer: Franklin Engine Company
- First run: 1942

The Franklin O-405 (company designation 6AC-403) was an American air-cooled aircraft engine of the 1940s. The engine was of six-cylinder, horizontally-opposed layout and displaced 405 cu in (6.64 L). The power output was between 200 hp (149 kW) and 250 hp (186 kW) depending on variant. The O-405-9 (6ACV-403) was a vertically mounted, fan cooled version for helicopters.

== Variants ==
6AC-403 (XO-405-1)
200 hp (149 kW) at 2,750 rpm

6ACSA-403 (XO-405-3)
Supercharged, 220 hp (164 kW) at 2,750 rpm

6ACGSA-403 (O-405-5)
Supercharged, geared propeller drive at 0.632:1. 250 hp (186 kW) at 3,200 rpm

6ACV-403 (O-405-9)
Vertically mounted, fan-cooled helicopter version, 245 hp (183 kW) at 3,275 rpm

== Applications ==
- Culver XPQ-15
- Doman LZ-1A
- Doman Pelican
- Fairchild XUC-86B
- Fleetwings XBQ-1
- Kellett XR-8
- Sikorsky R-6

== Specifications (6AC-403/XO-405-1) ==
Data from

=== General characteristics ===
- Type: 6-cylinder air-cooled horizontally opposed aircraft piston engine
- Bore: 4.625 in (117.5 mm)
- Stroke: 4.0 in (101.6 mm)
- Displacement: 403.2 in³ (6.6 L)
- Dry weight: 405 lb (184 kg)

=== Components ===
- Cooling system: Air-cooled

=== Performance ===
- Power output: 200 hp (149 kW) at 2,750 rpm

== See also ==
Comparable engines

- Continental Tiara 6-260

Related lists

- List of aircraft engines
