= Culver Aircraft Company =

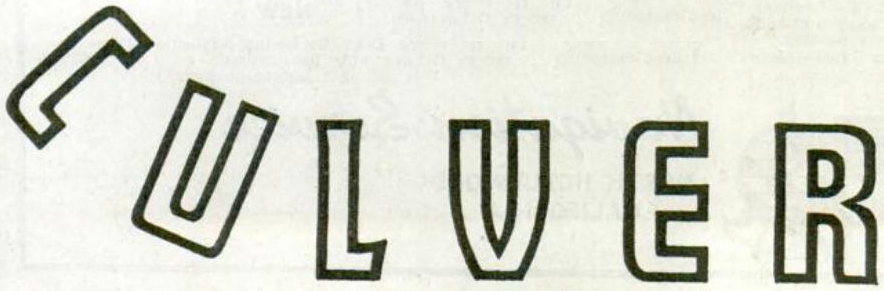
- Industry: Aerospace
- Predecessor: Dart Aircraft Company
- Founded: 1939; 87 years ago
- Founder: K.K. Culver; Al Mooney
- Defunct: 1946; 80 years ago
- Successor: Superior Aircraft Company
- Headquarters: Columbus, Ohio, Wichita, Kansas
- Number of employees: 130 (1941)

The Culver Aircraft Company was an American aircraft manufacturer of light aircraft of the 1930s and 1940s.

== History ==
The Dart Manufacturing Corporation was founded in Columbus, Ohio, by Monocoupe dealer Knight K. Culver and Al Mooney to purchase the rights to the Mooney-designed Monosport G from the defunct Lambert Aircraft Corporation. The company was renamed the Culver Aircraft Company in 1939. In December 1939, Culver produced the Culver Model L, later renaming it Cadet. Production was supervised by Al's brother, Art Mooney.

Having moved from Columbus to Wichita, Kansas, after producing 50 aircraft, two retractable-gear models, the LFA and LCA, were introduced, and in 1941 the company was taken over by Walter Beech (founder of Beechcraft) and Charles Yankey. The company switched to subcontract work during World War II. Culver produced a radio-controlled pilotless aircraft based on the LFA for use as target drones. Over 3000 PQ-8/TDC and PQ-14/TD2C gunnery target drones were produced for the USAAF and USN.

T. Bowring Woodbury was promoted to president in 1945. That same year, Culver developed the Model V. The V, also known as the M-17, featured a patented flight control system, known as Simpli-Fly Control, which automated a number of flight functions; the system was looked down upon by pilots, and the Model V was not considered a success. The Model V was developed into the XPQ-15 drone, but did not win production orders; not very long after the end of World War II, Culver Aircraft entered bankruptcy, the Mooney brothers departing to form the Mooney Aircraft Company and the manufacturing plant was purchased by the Coleman Company. In 1956, the Superior Aircraft Company was established, purchasing the assets of the Culver Aircraft Company, and put the Model V back into production as the Superior Satellite.

== Aircraft ==
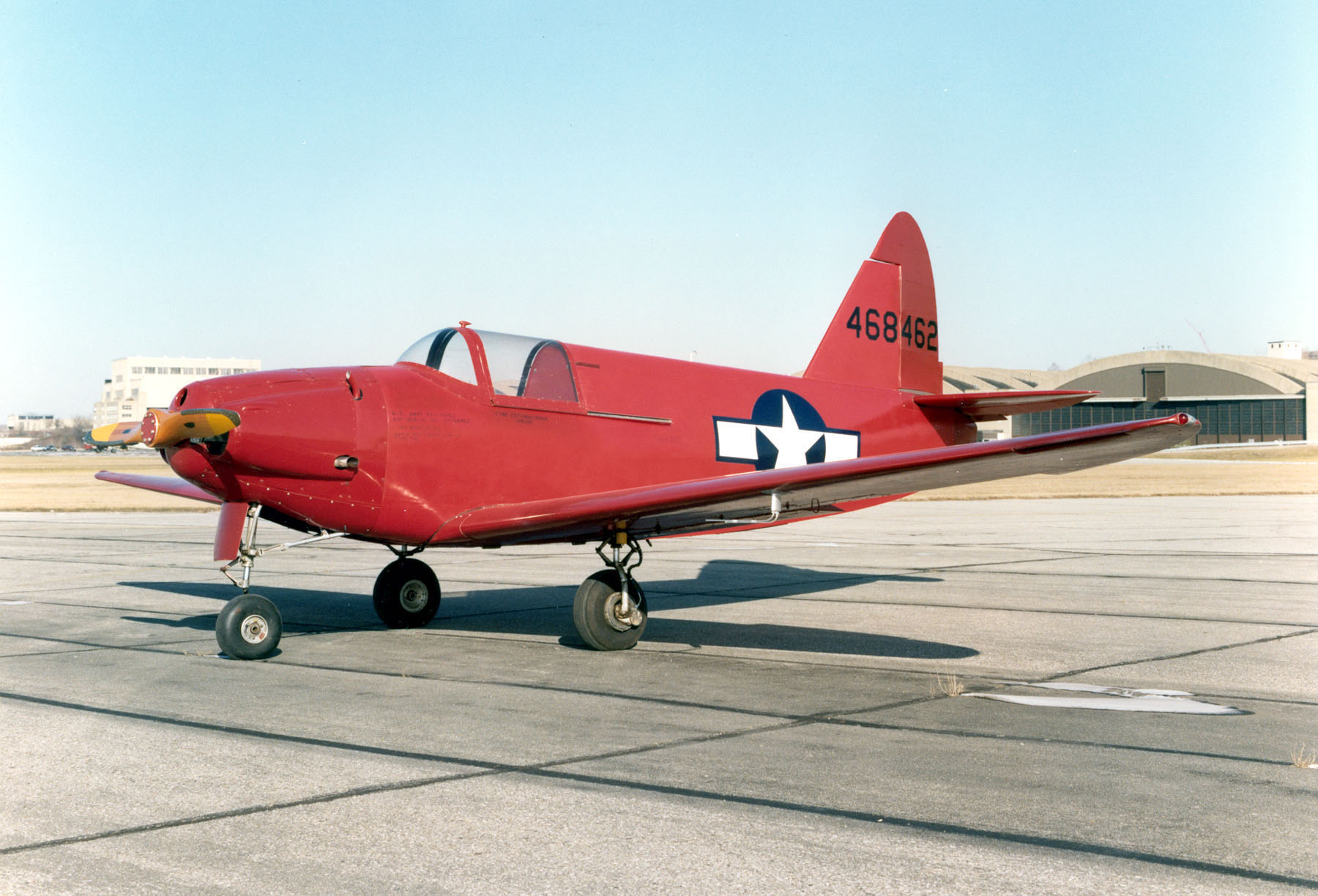
A Culver PQ-14

Model name	First flight	Number built	Notes
Dart G	1938	50	
Dart GC	1939	10	
Dart GK	1938	25	
Dart GW	1939	8	
Dart GW Special	1939	2	
Cadet LCA	1939		
Cadet LFA	1939		
Cadet LFA-90	1941		
LAR (Army A-8)	1941		Redesignated as PQ-8
LAR-90 (Army PQ-8)	1941	200	
PQ-8A	1941	200	
Q-8A			Redesignated PQ-8s.
PQ-10	1940s	0	
TDC-1	1941	1	
TDC-2	1941	201	
XPQ-14	1942	1	Converted PQ-8
PQ-14A/TD2C Turkey	1942	1400	
PQ-14B		1100	
XPQ-14C		1	Converted PQ-14B
Q-14			Redesignated PQ-14s
XPQ-15	1945		
Culver Model V	1946	90	
