= Historical Aircraft Squadron =

- Location within Ohio
- Established: 1994
- Type: Nonprofit
- Coordinates: 39.7540°N 82.6644°W
- President: Eric Meister
- Curator: Don Bell
- Website: www.historicalaircraftsquadron.org

The Historical Aircraft Squadron is a non-profit organization located at the Fairfield County Airport in Carroll, Ohio focused on aviation history.

== History ==
The organization was founded in 1994. The following year, the organization considered building a museum with the promise that they might receive an airplane from Dave Tallichet. This came to pass in May 1998 when it was lent a Douglas A-26 Invader from his Military Aircraft Restoration Corporation. Eventually, it was joined by another A-26 and a North American B-25 Mitchell that were also placed on loan to the museum. The restoration of the first A-26 was completed in September 2009 and two years later left the museum for the 1941 Historical Aircraft Group Museum.

In the meantime, the organization built a new hangar at the airport in 2000, which it signed a 10-year lease for the next year. A Grumman S2F-1 Tracker was based with the squadron for a time in 2002. A plan for a church to build a new hangar at the airport in 2006 caused the museum to express concerns that it might lose some of its ramp space.

== Collection ==
=== Aircraft ===
- American Eaglet RF-1
- Beechcraft C-45B Expeditor
- Bensen gyrocopter
- Culver Cadet LCA – on loan
- Folland Gnat
- Hiller H-23B Raven
- Rutan Long-EZ
- Stinson L-5E Sentinel
- Stinson 10
- Taylorcraft BC-12D

=== Ground vehicles ===
- Kaiser Jeep M725

== Events ==
The organization held an annual Wings of Victory Airshow until 2009. It was replaced by a fly-in and pancake breakfast.
