= Culver Cadet =

American monoplane

Cadet / PQ-8
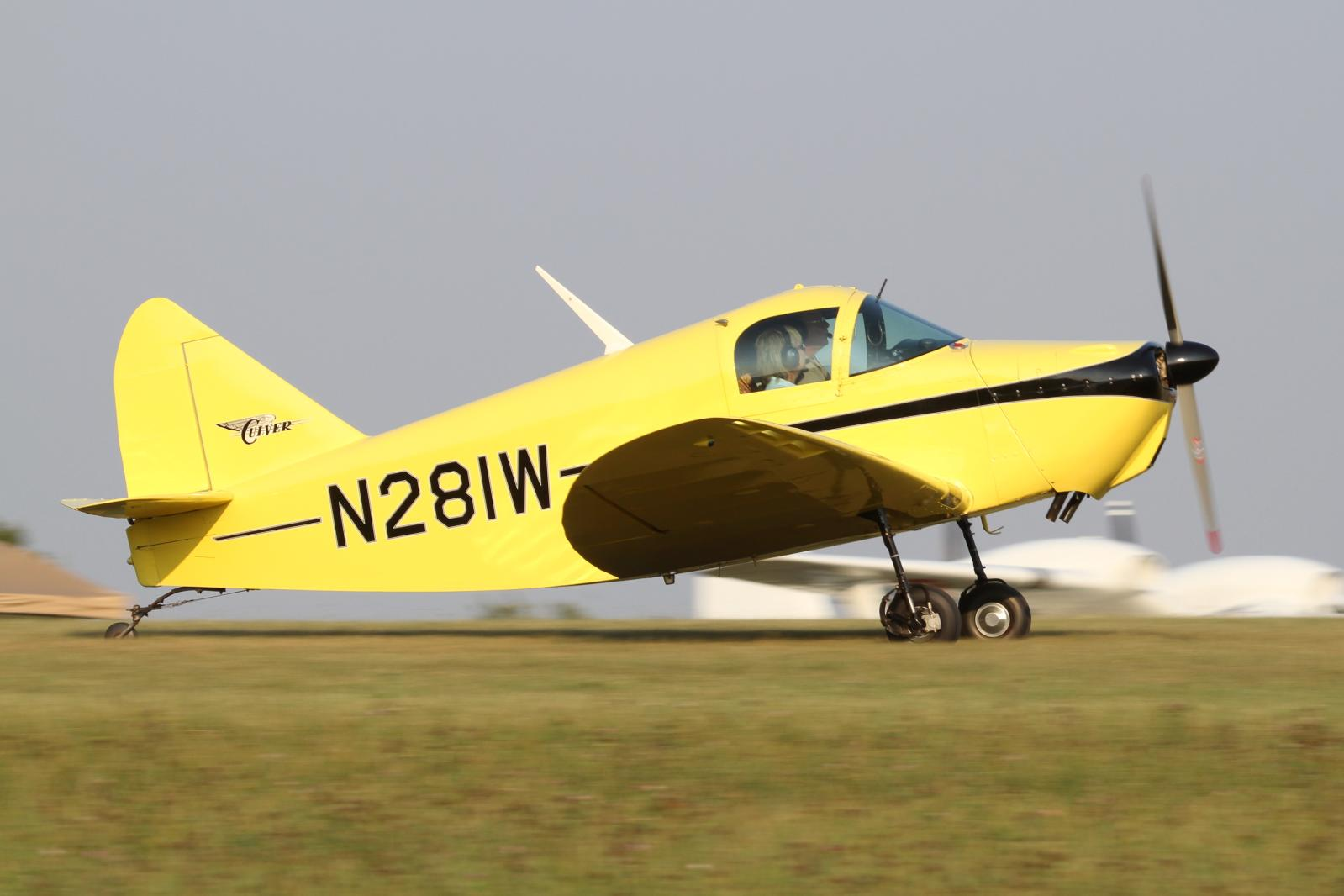
- Culver LCA Cadet

General information
- Type: Two-seat light monoplane
- National origin: United States
- Manufacturer: Culver Aircraft Company
- Designer: Albert Mooney
- Number built: 600+

History
- First flight: 1939
- Variant: Culver PQ-14 Cadet

The Culver Cadet is an American two-seat light monoplane aircraft, also as a radio-controlled drone, produced by the Culver Aircraft Company.

== Design and development ==
The aircraft designer Al Mooney developed an improved version of the Culver Dart, to provide improved performance with a smaller engine. Originally designated the Culver Model L, the prototype first flew on 2 December 1939. The aircraft was named the Culver Cadet. Although similar to the previous Dart, the Cadet had a semi-monocoque fuselage instead of welded-steel-tube, and a retractable tailwheel undercarriage. The first variant (the Cadet LCA) was powered by a 75 hp (56 kW) Continental A75-8 four-cylinder horizontally opposed piston engine.

The 1941 version was designated the Cadet LFA, introducing a number of refinements and more equipment, and was fitted with a 90 hp (67 kW) Franklin engine. Production was brought to an end after the United States entered World War II in December 1941, but the Cadet had found export orders, including to Uruguay, and had a new military role.

The Cadet was one of six models that Al Mooney designed during his eight years at Culver. He would leave to found Mooney Aircraft.

== Operational history ==
In 1940, the Cadet LCA was selected by the United States Army Air Corps as being suitable for use as a radio-controlled target. The first aircraft was designated the Culver A-8 (later the XPQ-8) and was based on the Cadet LFA, but had fixed tricycle landing gear. After successful tests, a production order for 200 was placed, and designated the PQ-8. Later, another 200 were ordered with a more powerful engine as the PQ-8A. In late 1941, the United States Navy acquired a PQ-8A for evaluation, and then ordered 200 in 1941 as the TDC-2. An enlarged and improved version was later built as the Culver PQ-14.

Several Cadets, with both military and civilian origins, are still (2012) airworthy in the United States, and some are preserved in airworthy condition by museums.

== Variants ==
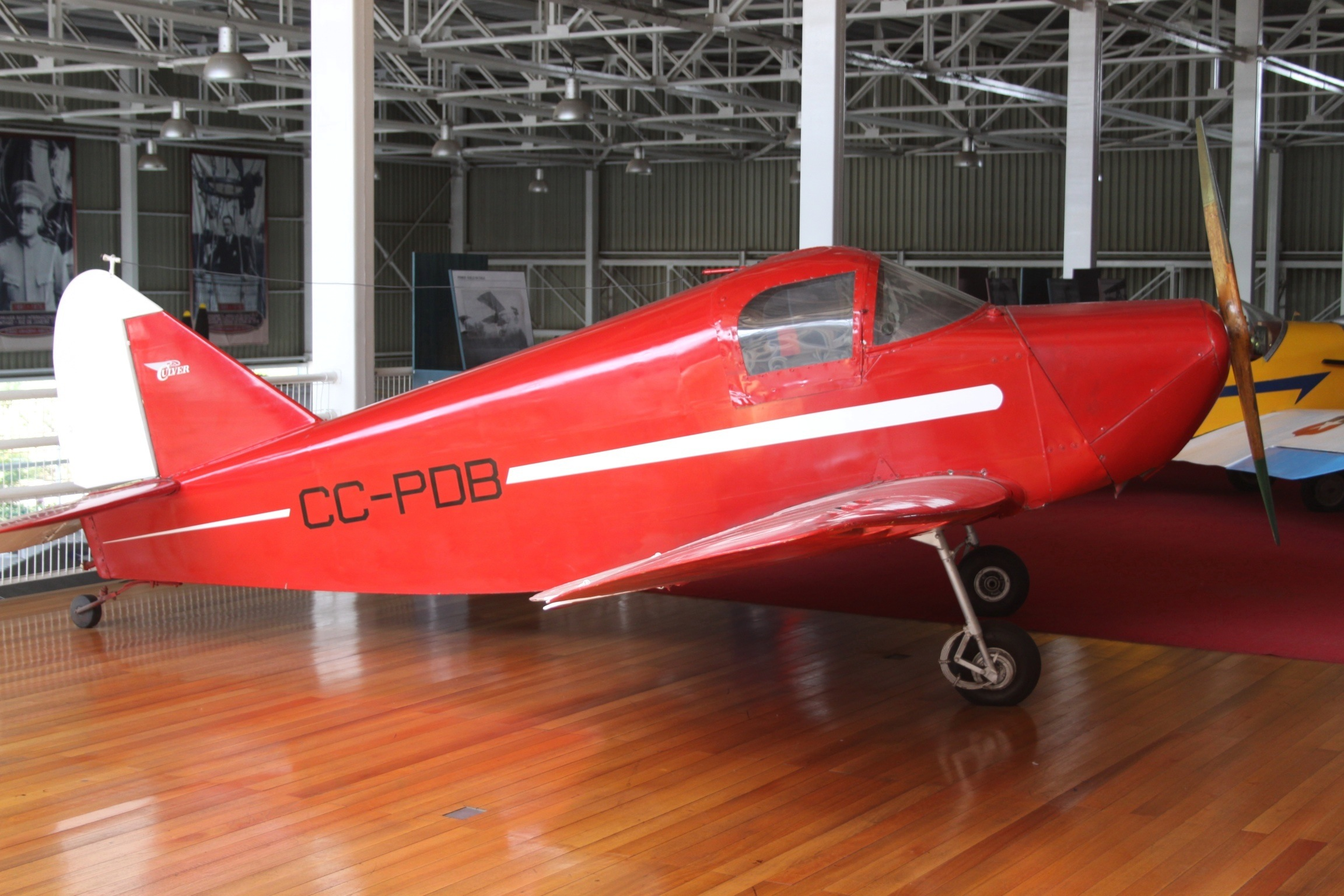
Culver LFA Cadet at Museo Nacional Aeronáutico y del Espacio, Chile

Cadet LCA
Initial production version powered by a 75 hp (56 kW) Continental A75-8.
Cadet LFA
Improved variant with an 80 hp (60 kW) Franklin 4AC-176-F3, Franklin 4AC-176-D2, or Franklin 4AC-176-D3 engine, and a full electrical system and engine starter.
Cadet LFA-90
Limited edition variant with a 90 hp (67 kW) Franklin 4AC-199-E3 engine.
LAR (Army A-8)
Initial designation of military radio-controlled drone version, later redesignated PQ-8.
LAR-90 (Army PQ-8)
Initial production military drone version, 200 built.
PQ-8A
PQ-8 powered by a 125 hp (93 kW) Lycoming O-290 engine, redesignated Q-8A in 1948, 200 built.
Q-8A
PQ-8A redesignated in 1948.

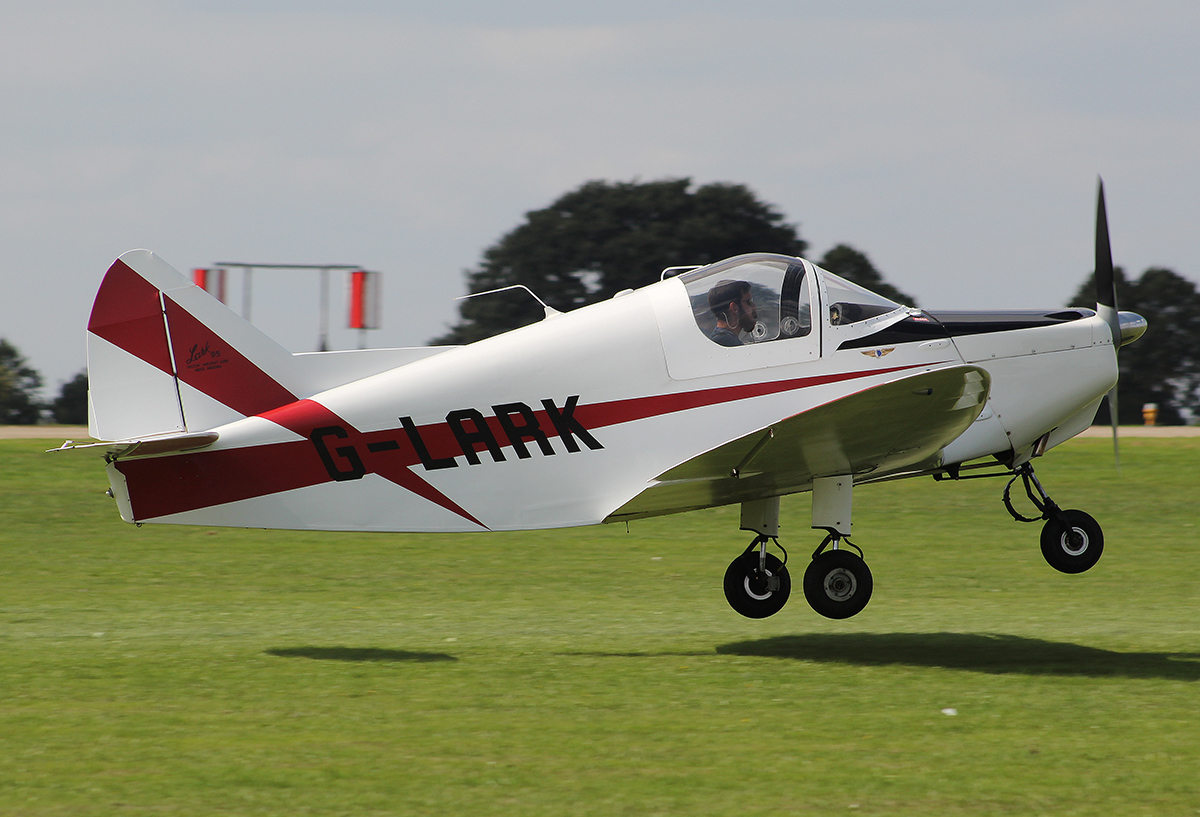
Helton Lark

TDC-1
One PQ-8 for evaluation by the United States Navy.
TDC-2
Production version of the PQ-8A for the Navy, 200 built.
Helton Lark 95
Development of Cadet by Helton Aircraft Corporation of Mesa, Arizona. Powered by 90 horsepower (67 kW) Continental C90-16F engine. FAA type approved in September 1966. 15 Lark 95s delivered in 1966. Helton reported as out of business in 1971.
Helton Lark 95A
Modified Lark 96, with 2 feet (0.61 m) longer fuselage and revised tail surfaces.
Aero Systems Cadet STF
Plans-built "optimized" Cadet design, offered by Aero Systems of La Mesa, California, United States in 2010. The plans call for a wood and steel structure, with a 100 hp (75 kW) Continental O-200 powerplant, producing a cruise speed of 135 mph (217 km/h).

== Operators ==
United States

- United States Army Air Corps
- United States Navy

== Surviving aircraft ==
- On display at the Historical Aircraft Squadron Museum in Carroll, Ohio. It is on loan from the Ohio Historical Society, who acquired it from the Ohio History of Flight Museum in 2000.
- 133 – LCA on display at the Chico Air Museum in Chico, California.
- 140 – LCA on display at the National Warplane Museum in Geneseo, New York.
- 236 – LCA on display at the Western Antique Aeroplane & Automobile Museum in Hood River, Oregon.
- 269 – LFA on display at the Golden Age Air Museum in Bethel, Pennsylvania.
- 274 – LFA on display at the Champaign Aviation Museum in Urbana, Ohio.
- 330 – LFA-90 on display at the Vintage Flying Museum in Fort Worth, Texas.
- 380 – LCA on display at the Historic Aircraft Restoration Museum in Maryland Heights, Missouri.
- 443 – LCA on display at the Airpower Museum in Ottumwa, Iowa.

== Specifications (Cadet LFA) ==
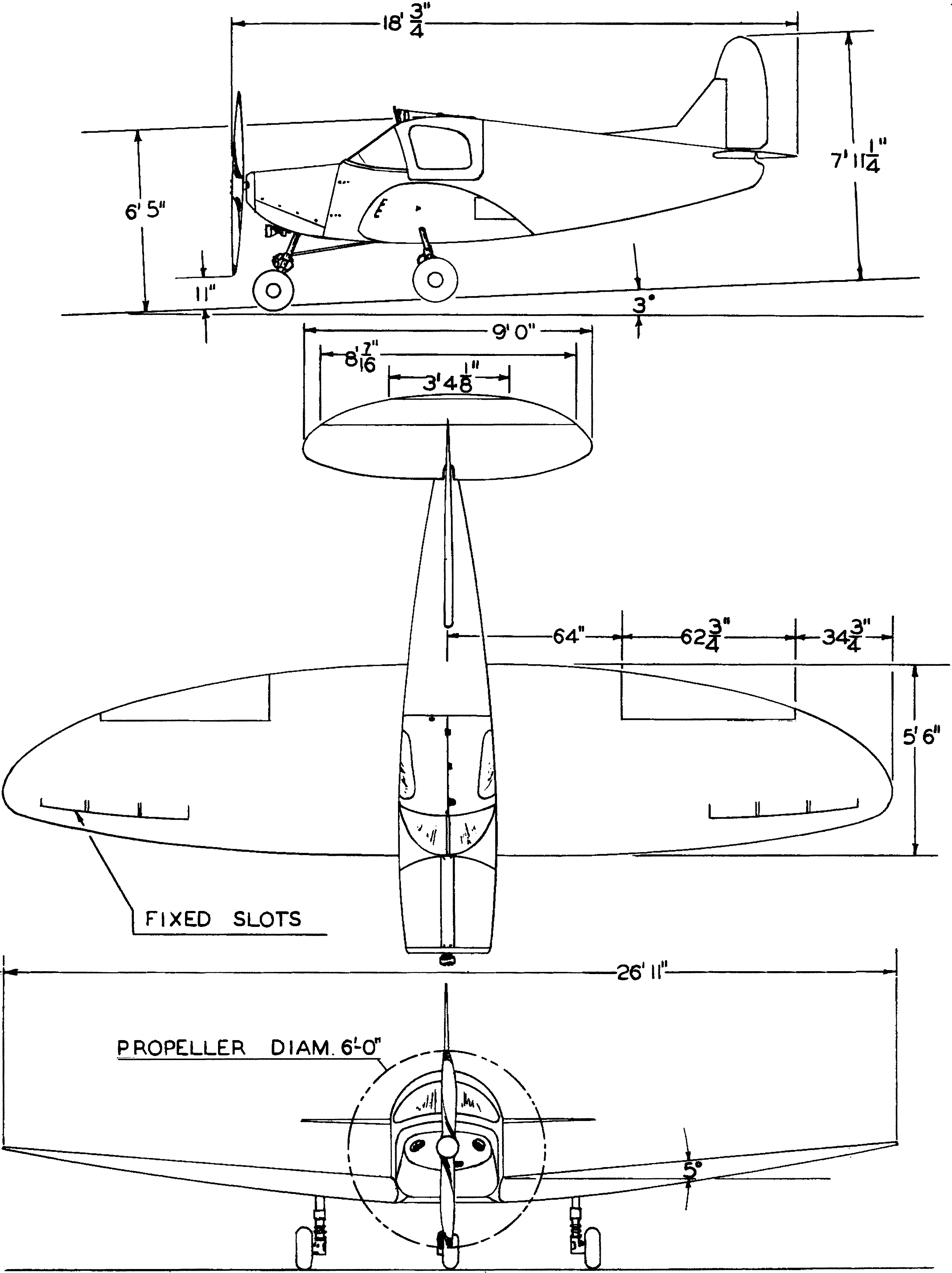
3-view line drawing of the Culver PQ-8A

Data from U.S. Civil Aircraft Vol. 8

General characteristics

- Crew: two
- Length: 17 ft 8 in (5.38 m)
- Wingspan: 27 ft 0 in (8.23 m)
- Height: 5 ft 6 in (1.68 m)
- Wing area: 120 sq ft (11 m^{2})
- Airfoil: NACA3414 at wing root, NACA 3408 at tip
- Empty weight: 806 lb (366 kg)
- Gross weight: 1,305 lb (592 kg)
- Fuel capacity: 20 US gal (17 imp gal; 76 L)
- Powerplant: 1 × Franklin 4AC-176-F3 air-cooled flat-four piston, 80 hp (60 kW)

Performance

- Maximum speed: 142 mph (229 km/h, 123 kn) at 3,000 ft (910 m)
- Cruise speed: 130 mph (210 km/h, 110 kn) at 7,000 ft (2,100 m) (75% power)
- Range: 500 mi (800 km, 430 nmi)
- Service ceiling: 17,000 ft (5,200 m)
- Rate of climb: 800 ft/min (4.1 m/s) at sea level

== See also ==
Related development

- Culver PQ-14 Cadet

Aircraft of comparable role, configuration, and era

- Aeronca Arrow
- Culver V
- Globe GC-1 Swift
- Johnson Rocket 185
- Piper PT-1
