= Fairfield County Airport (Ohio) =

- IATA: none; ICAO: KLHQ; FAA LID: LHQ

Summary
- Airport type: Public
- Owner: Fairfield County Commissioners
- Serves: Fairfield County
- Location: Lancaster, Ohio
- Time zone: UTC−05:00 (-5)
  - Summer (DST): UTC−04:00 (-4)
- Elevation AMSL: 868 ft (265 m)
- Coordinates: 39°45′20″N 082°39′26″W
- Website: fairfieldcountyairport.com

Map
- Location of airport in Ohio LHQ (the United States)

Runways
Direction	Length		Surface
Direction	ft	m	Surface
10/28	5,003	1,525	Asphalt

Statistics (2021)
- Aircraft operations: 43,582
- Based aircraft: 106
- Sources: FAA, airport website

Fairfield County Airport (ICAO: KLHQ, FAA LID: LHQ) (Note: The airport formerly used the FAA location identifier I15.) is a public use airport in Fairfield County, Ohio, United States. It is located three nautical miles (6 km) northwest of the central business district of Lancaster, the county seat. The airport is owned by the Fairfield County Commissioners.

Although most U.S. airports use the same three-letter location identifier for the FAA and IATA, this airport is assigned LHQ by the FAA but has no designation from the IATA.

The airport regularly hosts community events such as fly-ins. These events feature food trucks, historic aircraft displays, vintage cars, museum tours, law enforcement displays, and more.

Some of these events are hosted by the Experimental Aircraft Association, which has a chapter at the airport. The Young Eagles regularly host free flights at the airport. The Historical Aircraft Squadron is also located at the airport.

== History ==
The airport, previously known as Port Lancaster, was purchased by Anchor Hocking Glass Corporation. In 1959, the company began operating a Beechcraft E18 factory fitted with rocket-equipped takeoff, replacing one of two previous Beechcraft planes operated by the company. Anchor Hocking donated the airport to the county in mid July 1968 to enable it to become eligible for a state grant. The grant, approved in November, paid for the runway to be extended from 3,500 ft (1,100 m) to 5,000 ft (1,500 m). The airport was dedicated on 18 June 1969. It was again dedicated on 29 August 1971. At the time a 2,400 sq ft (220 m^{2}) terminal building was nearly complete.

A skydiving company was blocked from moving to the airport in 2008 over concerns that skydivers would conflict with planes taking off and landing at the airport.

In 2010, residents nearby objected to moving a road near the airport closer to houses. The road would be relocated to address safety concerns raised by the FAA, who argued pilots needed to fly too close to the road and descent too steeply after it to make a safe landing. Moving the road would allow the entirety of the runway to be used for landing instead of forcing the threshold to be displaced. The road was moved by circa 2019.

In 2023, plans were announced to build 14 new hangars at the airport at a cost of $5 million.

== Facilities and aircraft ==
=== Facilities ===
Fairfield County Airport covers an area of 130 acres (53 ha) at an elevation of 868 feet (265 m) above mean sea level. It has one runway designated 10/28 with an asphalt surface measuring 5,003 by 75 feet (1,525 x 23 m).

Currently there is one Standard Terminal Arrival (GUNNE ONE) and four instrument approaches (an RNAV GPS approach in to runway 10 and 28, a localizer for 28 and a VOR or GPS-A circling approach) to the airport.

Sundowner Aviation was the Fixed-Base Operator, which provides fuel, maintenance, flight instruction, charter flights, hangars and tie-downs, Lasergrade testing, WSI aviation weather, and car rental.

=== Aircraft ===
For the 12-month period ending July 29, 2021, the airport had 43,582 aircraft operations, an average of 119 per day: nearly 100% general aviation and <1% military. At that time there were 106 aircraft based at this airport: 87 single-engine and 9 multi-engine airplanes, 8 helicopters, 1 jet, and 1 ultralight.

== Accidents and incidents ==
- On December 27, 1974, a Rockwell Sabreliner 60 hit trees while executing an instrument approach procedure to the Fairfield County Airport, killing all three people aboard.
- On April 23, 2000, a Cessna 150 was substantially damage during takeoff from the Fairfield County Airport. The airplane became airborne about halfway down Runway 10. Upon reaching an altitude of 10-20 feet above the surface, the airplane entered a series of slight climbs and descents, after which point the plane completed a 180 degree turn. The airplane contacted the ground, bounce back into the air 20 to 30 feet, before it contacted the ground a second time and nosed over. The probable cause of the accident was found to be the pilot's improper recovery from a bounced landing.
- On May 6, 2014, a Piper PA-32 Cherokee Six was substantially damaged after landing in a field while operating at the Fairfield County Airport. The pilot was conducting touch-and-go landings at the airport at night and was in the traffic pattern for the second landing when the engine experienced a partial loss of power. The pilot adjusted the throttle lever, mixture control, fuel selector, and fuel pump, but the engine did not respond, so the pilot made an emergency landing in a field. The probable cause of the accident was found to be fuel starvation due to the deterioration of the fuel selector valve, which allowed fuel to be fed from only the right tip tank.
- On June 21, 2016, a Cessna 172 was damaged during a hard landing at the Fairfield County Airport. The probable cause of the incident was found to be the pilot's improper landing flare in gusting wind conditions, which resulted in a hard landing.
- On August 31, 2018, a Cubcrafters CC11-160 airplane landed in a soybean field while attempting to land at Lancaster County Airport. The pilot reported that, during the transition from cruise flight to the airport's traffic pattern, the airplane's engine began to run rough. The problem was not arrested with carburetor heat. When the carburetor heat was turned off, the engine lost all power, and the pilot performed an off-airport landing to a farm field. During the landing, the airplane nosed over in the waist-high vegetation.
- On July 20, 2021, a Piper PA-24 attempting to land at the Fairfield County Airport crashed off-airport after experiencing engine problems.

== See also ==
- List of airports in Ohio
