= Al Mooney =

American businessman

Albert W. Mooney
- Born: 12 April 1906; Denver, Colorado, US
- Died: 7 May 1986 (aged 80); Dallas, Texas
- Known for: Mooney Aircraft Company

Albert W. Mooney (12 April 1906 – 7 May 1986) was a self-taught American aircraft designer and early aviation entrepreneur. He and brother Arthur Mooney founded the Mooney Aircraft Company in 1929. His first production design (first flight 1947) was the Mooney M-18 Mite. The M-18 developed into the Mooney M20 in 1955, which was produced through several iterations on-and-off from 1955 through 2019, with over 11,000 examples built.

== Early life ==
Albert W. "Al" Mooney was born in Denver, Colorado, on 12 April 1906. His older brother Arthur was born on 10 July 1904. Their father John was an engineer who designed railroad tunnels and trestles for the Denver & Rio Grande, and he taught his sons about drafting and layout. Both young men worked for the railroad when they were not in school.

Mooney's interest in airplane design began while still in grade school and grew as he progressed to high school. While in high school, he realized that he excelled at mathematics, and that his understanding of it offered many possibilities for him. Seeking information on aircraft, Mooney asked his teacher what he should study that would best allow him to design safe airplanes, but he was told there was no such thing as a safe aircraft and he should wait until college before pursuing the topic. Realizing his current schooling would provide limited access to his desires, he began spending time at the Denver Public Library, where he read all the available handbooks for pilots and designers.

=== Early career ===
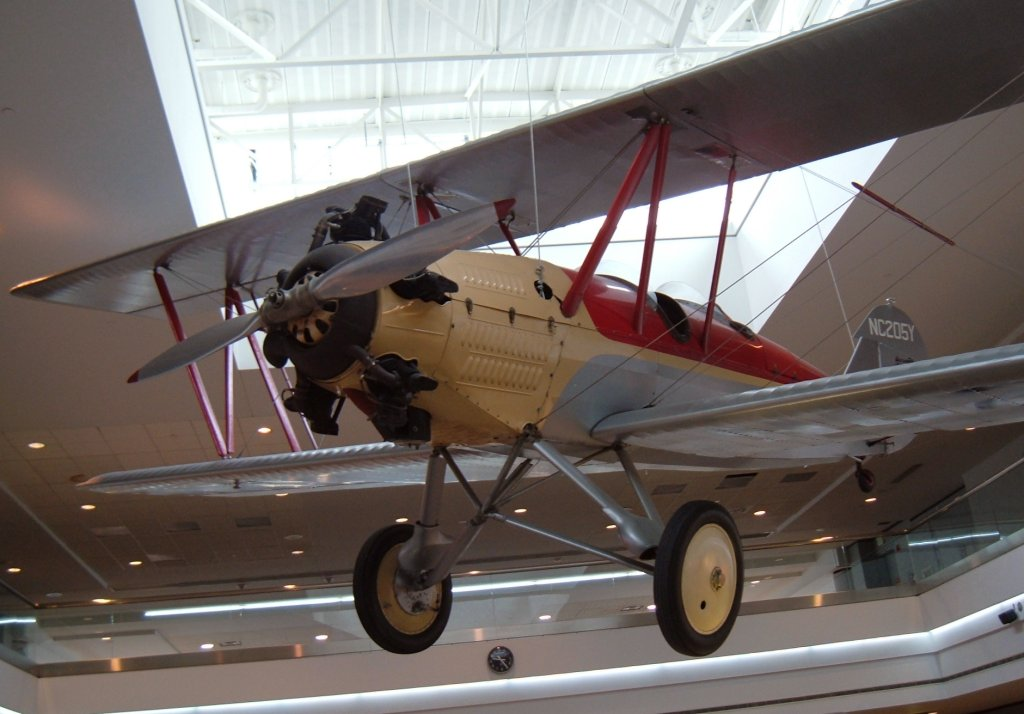
A model of the Eaglerock, an airplane designed by Albert Mooney

After his high school graduation, Mooney's plan of attending the Colorado School of Mines changed after he saw a Swallow biplane fly over where he was working. Following the aircraft to the local airfield, he noticed several mistakes in the aircraft rigging which he offered to help fix. After rerigging the plane, which was flown by J. Don Alexander, Mooney was offered a job. At age 19 he was hired as an assistant to the chief engineer and draftsman at the Alexander Aircraft Company in Denver. His early years proved unfruitful, assisting on an eventually failed design. Finally Mooney got the chance to build the M-1 or Long Wing Eaglerock, a plane of his own design. While the airplane had some success as a trainer, it was not enough to keep him at the Alexander company. In 1926, after spending some time working for Montague, where he designed his M-2, Mooney took his first flying lessons. When Montague's finances ran out, Mooney returned to the Alexander company, where he was named chief engineer in 1928. During his time as chief engineer, Mooney was responsible for several advances in the field of aircraft design, primarily through his Bullet, a low-wing airplane with relatively high speeds and a patented retractable landing gear.

== Production years ==
=== The first Mooney Aircraft Company ===
In 1929, with the financial backing of the Bridgeport Machine Co., Mooney left the Alexander Aircraft Corporation. He and Arthur moved to Wichita, Kansas, where they started the Mooney Aircraft Corporation. Their early years were spent designing the Mooney A-1, which was similar to the Bullet, and the M-5. The M-5 prototype flew seven months after the company started up. With the aircraft industry sales declining due to the onset of the great depression, Mooney decided to fly the M-5 nonstop from Glendale, California, to Long Island, New York, as a promotional feat. However, the nonstop flight failed near Fort Wayne, Indiana, when his engine quit due to faulty welding on the fuel pump. In 1931, with the economy failing, the Mooney Corporation closed its doors.

Mooney continued pursuing aircraft design after his company failed. His next design, the M-6, was a two-place low-wing design. However, development came to a halt with financial difficulty that prevented the purchasing of an engine. After several years of searching for financing and continuing design, the M-6 fell through the cracks and never made production.

=== Bellanca and Culver ===
While most of the aircraft industry was in shambles in the middle of the great depression, the Bellanca aircraft company had some continued success due to contracts with the Navy and the company's popularity among Alaskan bush pilots. In 1934 Mooney was named chief engineer at Bellanca. During this period, Mooney worked closely with its owner, the well-respected Italian-born Giuseppe Bellanca. In his time at Bellanca, Mooney was responsible for the designs of the Bellanca Airbus cargo plane and the racer Irish Swoop.

After his time with Bellanca, Mooney went briefly to Monocoupe Corporation. Working with the small startup company, he designed the Model G Dart and the Monocoach. In his time with Monocoupe, several features of future Mooney aircraft were designed, including rubber shock biscuits in the landing gear legs, and spring-assisted manual gear retract. After Monocoupe went under due to financial distress, Mooney's designs were purchased by Culver Aircraft, and in 1937, Mooney joined Culver as chief engineer. In his days at Culver before World War II, he designed the Culver Cadet acrobatic plane, over 350 of which were built. As war enveloped the country, Culver's main focus shifted towards military drones, in which Mooney had little interest. During this time, Mooney started a business relationship with C. G. "Al" Yankey, which eventually led to the founding of a second Mooney Aircraft Company. As Culver's commercial sales began to slow down with the end of the war and tough competition from the Cessna 120, Mooney left the Culver company.

=== The second Mooney Aircraft Company ===
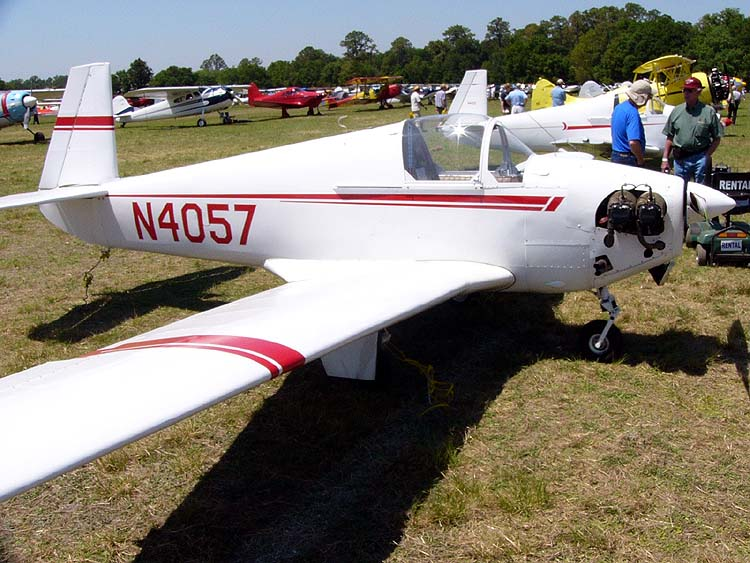
An M-18 Mooney Mite

In July 1946, with the partnership of C.G. Yankey and W.L. McMahon, Al and Art Mooney resurrected the Mooney Aircraft Corporation, with Al as general manager and chief engineer. The first aircraft produced was the M-18, a single-place retractable-gear aircraft, and the first of its kind available on the market after World War II; it was later named the Mite. After some problems with engine selection and the decision to replace them, Mooney began his next design, the M20, a four-place design of metal construction (the M-18 was made largely of wood). In 1953, the corporation's main financial backer, Al Yankey, died of a stroke before proper funding had been finalized for the M20. With the company again in financial distress, it was taken over by Hal Rachal and Norm Hoffman. Only two years after the first flight of the M20, Al left the Mooney Aircraft Company and started working at Lockheed.

== The later years ==
=== Lockheed ===
After leaving the Mooney Aircraft Company, a company in which he had no ownership though it carried his name, Mooney moved to Lockheed, where he spent the rest of his career. In his time with Lockheed, his aircraft designs continued, including a proposal that was developed into the Lockheed Jetstar. Later he led the Lockheed XV-4 Hummingbird project. Other designs credited to him include the AL-60 and another unnamed Lockheed business jet.

=== Retirement ===
In 1964, while Mooney was designing his final aircraft, a benign tumor was found in his wife Opie. This was the beginning of a decline in her health, ending with her death in 1966. His initial response to her death was to lose himself in his work. However, when his brother Arthur retired in 1967, he realized that he was no longer enjoying his work, and retired in 1968. On 7 May 1986 in Dallas, Texas, Albert Mooney died at the age of 80.

== Bibliography ==
- Ball, Larry A. (1998). Those Remarkable Mooneys. Indianapolis: Ball Publications. ISBN 0-9641514-9-9.
