= Culver Model V =

American two-seat monoplane

Model V
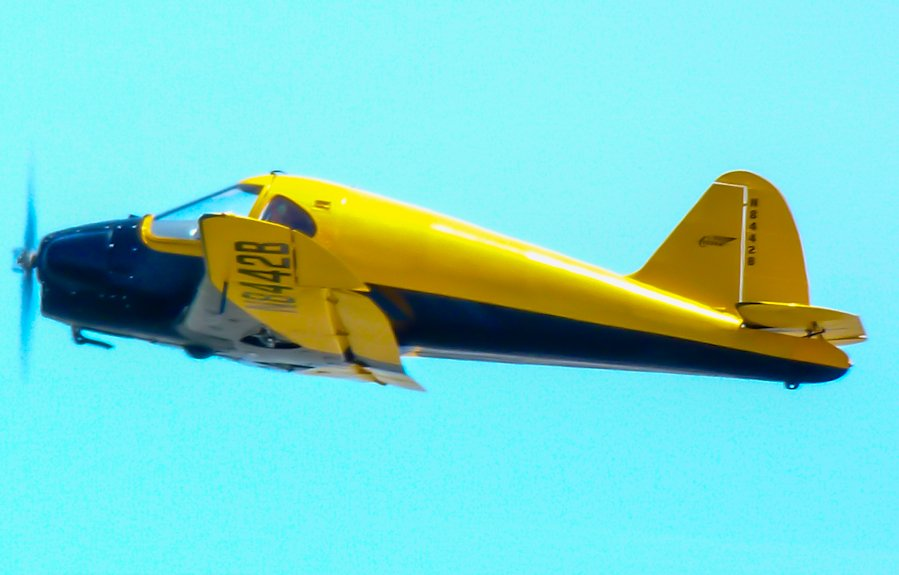

General information
- Type: Two-seat cabin monoplane
- National origin: United States
- Manufacturer: Culver Aircraft Company

History
- First flight: 1946

The Culver Model V is a two-seat cabin monoplane designed and built by the Culver Aircraft Company.

== Design and development ==
Based on the pre-World War II Cadet and using the wartime experience with radio-controlled aircraft the company designed a two-seat cabin monoplane. The Model V had a low-set cantilever wing with the outer panels having a pronounced dihedral. It had a tricycle retractable landing gear and an enclosed cabin with side by side seating for two.

It was unique in that it had a system called Simpli-Fly Control where the aircraft was automatically trimmed for takeoff, landing and cruise, and flaps simultaneously adjusted, by turning a small metal wheel between the two seats and lining up two arrows with the mode of flying the aircraft. Interconnecting controls then adjusted both the flap setting and elevator-trim according to the arrow settings.

In 1956 the Superior Aircraft Company bought the assets of Culver and put the Model V back into production as the Superior Satellite. The main difference was the use of a 95 hp Continental engine which increased the cruise speed to 130 mph (209 km/h). Only a prototype and five production aircraft were built.

== Variants ==
V-1
Initial production variant.
V-2
Improved variant.
Superior Satellite
1956 variant with a 95hp Continental engine.
TD4C
USN radio-controlled target version of the V-2
UC
The utility version of the TD4C, also converted to target drone as the UC-1K.

== Specifications (V-1) ==
Data from

General characteristics

- Crew: one (pilot)
- Capacity: one passenger
- Length: 20 ft 8.5 in (6.31 m)
- Wingspan: 29 ft 0 in (8.84 m)
- Height: 6 ft 9.5 in (2.07 m)
- Wing area: 125.9 sq ft (11.70 m^{2})
- Empty weight: 1,070 lb (485 kg)
- Gross weight: 1,600 lb (726 kg)
- Powerplant: 1 × Continental C85 4-cyl. air-cooled horizontally-opposed piston engine , 85 hp (63 kW)

Performance

- Cruise speed: 125 mph (201 km/h, 109 kn)
- Range: 338 mi (544 km, 294 nmi)
- Service ceiling: 13,200 ft (4,025 m)
