= Culver XPQ-15 =

American target drone

XPQ-15/XTD3C
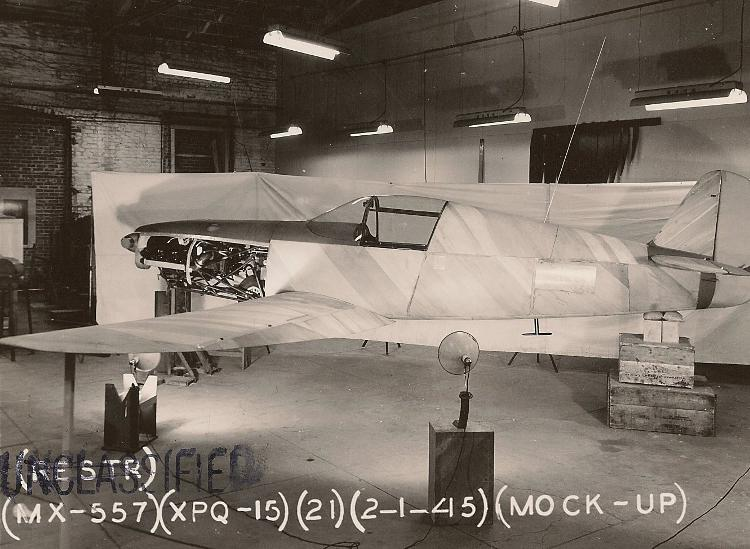
- Mockup of the XPQ-15

General information
- Type: Target drone
- National origin: United States
- Manufacturer: Culver Aircraft Company
- Primary users: United States Army Air Forces United States Navy

History
- Manufactured: 6
- First flight: 1945

The Culver XPQ-15, also known as the XTD3C-1, was an American target drone developed by the Culver Aircraft Company late in World War II.

== Design and development ==
The XPQ-15 was a low-wing monoplane of conventional design. It was powered by a Franklin O-405 opposed piston engine. Design work began in 1943.

== Operational history ==
Four examples of the XPQ-15 were built for evaluation by the United States Army Air Forces in 1945; two additional aircraft were tested by the United States Navy as the XTD3C-1. No production contract was placed.

== Variants ==
XPQ-15
USAAF variant; four produced.
XTD3C-1
USN variant; two produced, BuNos 29665-29666.

== Specifications (XPQ-15) ==
Data from Parsch

- Powerplant: 1 × Franklin O-405 opposed piston engine, 200 hp (150 kW)

Performance

- Maximum speed: 220 mph (350 km/h, 190 kn)
