= Culver Dart =

Dart
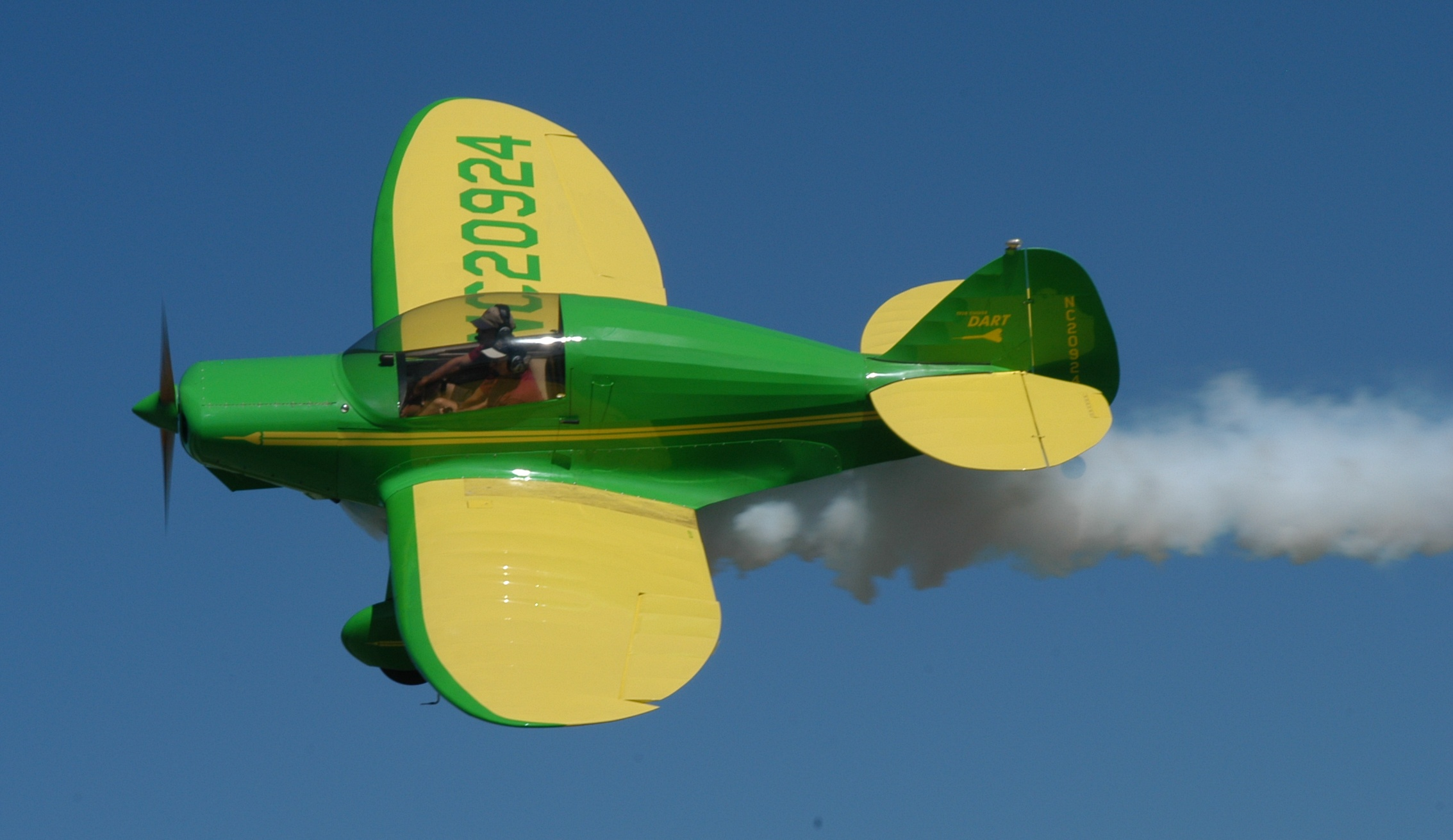
- A restored 1939 Culver Dart GK equipped for aerobatics over PLK

General information
- Type: Two-seat Light Monoplane
- Manufacturer: Culver Aircraft Company
- Designer: Albert Mooney

The Culver Dart was a 1930s American two-seat light monoplane aircraft produced by the Dart Aircraft Company (later the Culver Aircraft Company).

== Design and development ==
In the early 1930s Al Mooney was working for the Lambert Aircraft Corporation, builders of the Monocoupe series aircraft. He designed a small two-seat monoplane, the Monosport G. When the company ran into financial difficulties Mooney bought the rights to his design and with K.K. Culver formed the Dart Aircraft Company. The aircraft was renamed the Dart Dart or Dart Model G.

The aircraft was a low-wing monoplane designed to be light with clean lines to enable it to use low powered aero-engines. It had a fixed undercarriage and a tailwheel. The initial version was named the Dart G powered by a 90 hp (67 kW) Lambert R-266 radial engine. That engine was in short supply, so the aircraft was fitted with a Ken-Royce engine and designated the Dart GK. The final version was the Dart GW powered by a Warner Scarab Junior radial engine. Two special aircraft were built with larger engines. In 1939 the company was renamed the Culver Aircraft Company and the aircraft was renamed the Culver Dart.

== Variants ==
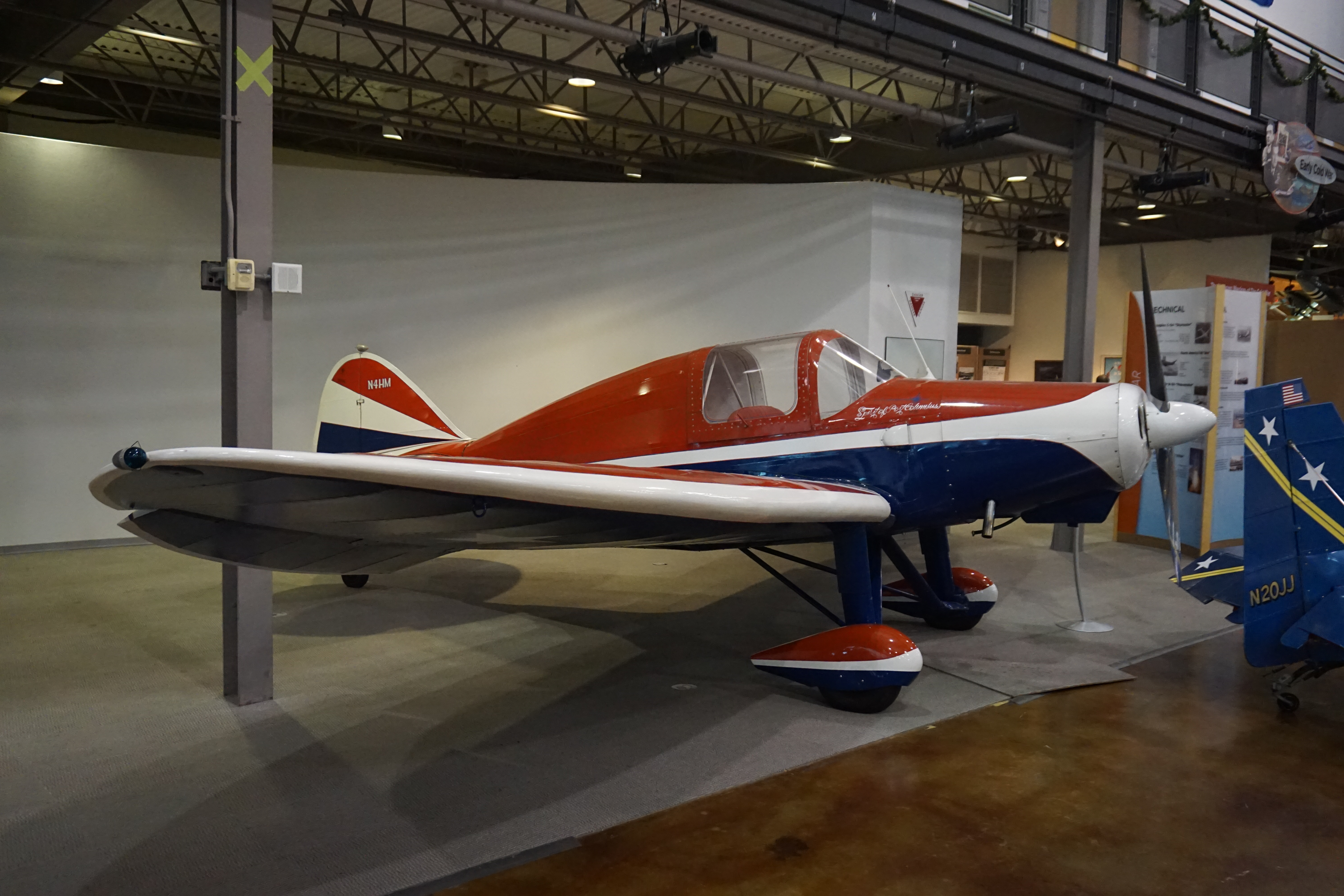
Dart GC at the Frontiers of Flight Museum

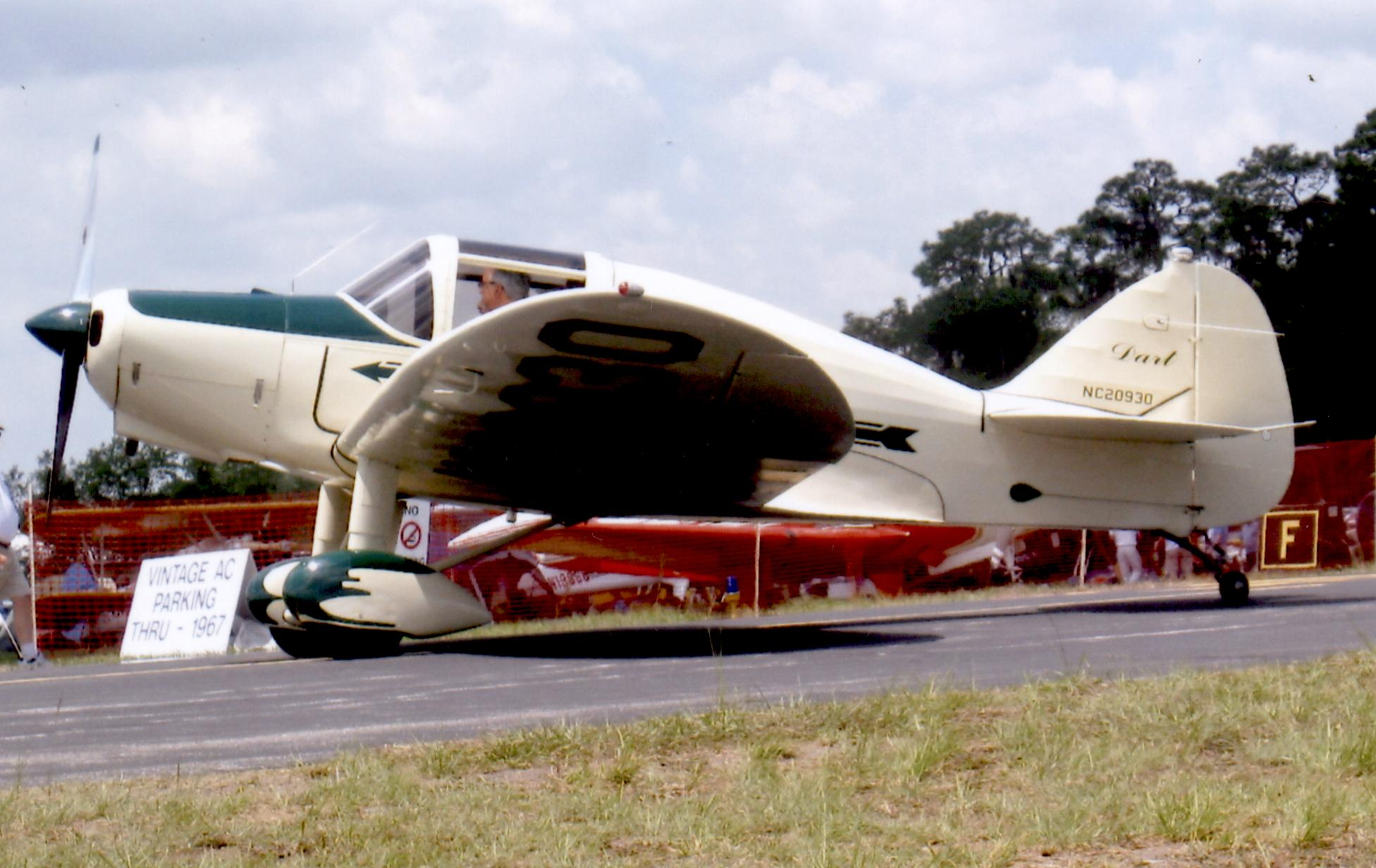
Dart GW of 1939 at Lakeland, Florida in April 2009

Dart G
Initial production version powered by a 90 hp (67 kW) Lambert R-266 - ca. 50 built.
Dart GC
125 hp (93 kW) Continental O-200 - 10 built
Dart GK
Variant fitted with a 90 hp (67 kW) Ken-Royce 5G engine - 25 built.
Dart GW
Final production version powered by a 90 hp (67 kW) Warner Scarab Junior - 8 built.
Dart GW Special
Two aircraft fitted with larger Warner engines, one with a 125 hp (93 kW) Warner Scarab engine, and the other with 145 hp (108 kW) Warner Super Scarab SS-50A engine.
X-F 220 Super Dart
An experimental variant modified with a 220 hp (160 kW) Continental R-670, 8 foot wing reduction and a 188 mph (163 kn; 303 km/h) cruise speed. Used by Rodney Jocelyn in national aerobatics.

== Surviving aircraft ==
The Ohio History Connection holds a Culver Dart G, NC18449, in its permanent collection since 2000. The airplane currently resides in offsite storage. WAAAM Western Antique Aeroplane and Automobile Museum displays an operational Dart G, serial no. G-11, N20993. This airplane appeared in Tarnished Angels.

== Specifications (Dart GW) ==
Data from Simpson, 2001, p.170

General characteristics

- Crew: 2
- Length: 18 ft 6 in (5.64 m)
- Wingspan: 29 ft 6 in (8.99 m)
- Height: 6 ft 1 in (1.85 m)
- Wing area: 176 sq ft (16.35 m^{2})
- Empty weight: 940 lb (426 kg)
- Max takeoff weight: 1,540 lb (699 kg)
- Powerplant: 1 × Warner Scarab Junior 5-cyl. air-cooled radial piston engine, 90 hp (67 kW)

Performance

- Maximum speed: 131 mph (211 km/h, 114 kn)
- Range: 495 mi (797 km, 430 nmi)
- Service ceiling: 16,000 ft (4,875 m)
