= Pretty =

Pretty may refer to:

- Beauty, the quality of being pleasing, especially to look at
  - Physical attractiveness, of a person's physical features

== Arts, entertainment, and media ==
- Pretty (advertisement), a 2006 television advertisement for Nike Women
- "Pretty (Ugly Before)", a 2003 song by Elliott Smith
- Pretty: A Memoir, a 2024 book by KB Brookins
- "Pretty", a 2018 song by Indian singer Aaliyah Qureishi
- "Pretty", a song on the Gigolo Aunts album Tales from the Vinegar Side
- "Pretty", a song on the Korn album Follow the Leader
- "Pretty", a song on the Nicky Byrne album Sunlight
- "Pretty", a song on The Cranberries album Everybody Else Is Doing It, So Why Can't We?
- "Pretty", a song by Nicole Scherzinger that leaked in 2016
- "Pretty", a song on the Weeknd's album Kiss Land
- "'Pretty", a song by Naaz from her EP Bits of Naaz
- "Pretty", a song on the Chance the Rapper album Star Line

== People ==
- Pretty John (1890–1964), Finnish forest laborer and storyteller
- Charles Fenn Pretty (1865–1940), Canadian forestry businessman
- David Pretty (born 1951), Australian rules footballer
- Diane Pretty (1958–2002), British euthanasia campaigner
- Edith Pretty (1883–1942), English landowner and amateur archaeologist
- Graeme Lloyd Pretty (1940–2000), Australian anthropologist
- Harold Pretty (1875–1952), English cricketer
- Walter Pretty (1909–1975), Royal Air Force air marshal
- Wayne Pretty (born 1936), Canadian rower

== Other ==
- Pretty, a Japanese clothing retailer later rebranded to Angelic Pretty in 2001

== See also ==
- Preti (disambiguation)
- Pretti (disambiguation)
- Pretty Baby (disambiguation)
- Pretty Boy (disambiguation)
- Pretty Creek, Hickman County, Tennessee
- Pretty Girl (disambiguation)
- Pretty Lady (disambiguation)
- Pretty Little Liars (disambiguation)
- Pretty Woman (disambiguation)
- Pretties, a 2005 novel by Scott Westerfeld
