= Prettyman =

Prettyman may refer to:

== People ==
- Albert I. Prettyman (1883-1963), American sports coach, athletics administrator, and educator
- Alfred Prettyman (born 1935), American publisher
- E. Barrett Prettyman (1891–1971), United States federal judge
- E. Barrett Prettyman Jr. (1925–2016), American lawyer
- Elijah Barrett Prettyman (1830–1907), the second principal of Maryland State Normal School (now Towson University)
- F. J. Prettyman (1860 - 1945), Methodist Clergyman and two-time Chaplain of the United States Senate
- Horace Greely Prettyman (1857–1945), American football player in the early years of the sport
- Quandra Prettyman (1933-20210, American scholar and educator
- Roxane L. Prettyman (born 1957), Democratic politician from Maryland
- Tristan Prettyman (born 1982), singer-songwriter and former Roxy model from San Diego, California
- William Prettyman (1858-1932), early American photographer

== Places ==
- E. Barrett Prettyman United States Courthouse, Home to the U.S. District Court for the District of Columbia and the U.S. Court of Appeals for the District of Columbia Circuit

== Other ==
- Bel Ami (TV series) (also known as Pretty Man), South Korean romantic comedy television series
- Pretty Woman, 1990 romantic comedy film
- Pretty Boy (disambiguation)
- Pretty Girl (disambiguation)
