= Lopresti =

Lopresti is an Italian surname, also written LoPresti or Lo Presti. Notable people with the surname include:

- Aaron Lopresti (born 1964), American comic book artist
- Charles LoPresti (born 1957), American race horse trainer
- Danielle LoPresti (born 1969), American musician
- Matthew LoPresti, American academic and politician
- Michael LoPresti Jr., (1947-2004), American politician
- Mike Lopresti (born 1953), American sportswriter
- Jack Lopresti (born 1969), British politician
- Jaime Lopresti (born 1974), Chilean footballer
- Anna Banti (1895–1985), Italian writer, art historian, critic, and translator, born Lucia Lopresti
- Pete LoPresti (born 1954), American ice hockey player, son of Sam
- Peter Essex-Lopresti (1916–1951), British orthopaedic surgeon
- Rodrigo Lopresti (born 1976), American actor, director, and musician
- Rocco Lo Presti (1937–2009), Italian mob boss of the Lo Presti 'ndrina
- Roy LoPresti (1929–2002), American aeronautical engineer
- Sam LoPresti (1917–1984), American ice hockey player, father of Pete
- Mike Lopresti (born 1981), Internet personality
