= Pretti =

Pretti is a surname of Italian origin. It originates as a patronymic or plural form of the surname Pretto. Notable people with the surname include:

- Alex Jeffrey Pretti (1988–2026), American nurse killed by United States Border Patrol agents
- Angelo Carlos Pretti (born 1965), Brazilian football player
- Francesco Pretti (1903–1988), Italian racewalker and Olympic athlete

== See also ==
- Presti (surname)
- Preti (disambiguation)
- Pretty (disambiguation)
