= Palladium-Item =

American newspaper from Indiana

- Type: Daily newspaper
- Format: Broadsheet
- Owner: USA Today Co.
- Founded: 1831
- Headquarters: 739 North 18th Street, Richmond, Indiana
- Country: United States
- ISSN: 2993-9534
- Website: pal-item.com

The Palladium-Item is an American daily morning newspaper for Richmond, Indiana, and surrounding areas. The paper is a merger of two older papers, the Richmond Palladium and the Richmond Item, and traces its history back to 1831, making it the oldest continuous business in Richmond.

The company was sold in 1976 to the Gannett Company, and is currently part of the USA Today network of titles. Its news director is Greg Fallon. Notable writers from the paper's staff include Mike Lopresti, who is now a sports columnist for the Gannett News Service and is published in many of their papers.

== Naming ==
The paper's website explains the origin of "Palladium" as referring to "Pallas Athena, whose warlike nature was provoked by injustice and interference with constructive, peaceful living. Pallas Athena was the Goddess of Wisdom and considered a symbol of protection," and that Palladium denotes "the protection of the rights of people, is believed to have come from Greek history where theft of a statue of Pallas Athena from ancient Troy is said to have resulted in Troy's destruction."
