= Presti (surname) =

Presti is a surname of Italian origin. Notable people with the surname include:

- Ida Presti (1924–1967), French classical guitarist and composer
- José Sérgio Presti, best known as Zé Sérgio (born 1957), Brazilian former football (soccer) player
- Philippe Presti (born 1965), French sailor
- Pino Presti, Italian bassist, arranger, composer, conductor and record producer
- Sam Presti (born c. 1976), American basketball executive
- Simon 'Presti' Prestigiacomo (born 1978), retired Australian rules footballer
- Thaissa Presti (born 1985), Brazilian track and field sprint athlete

== Other ==
- Stadio Vincenzo Presti, multi-use stadium in Gela, Italy

== See also ==
- Lopresti
