= George Bancroft Cornish =

American photographer

George Bancroft Cornish (1867 - 1946) was an early 20th century photographer of portraits and scenes from the American West including Native Americans and ranchers. He was based out of Arkansas City, Kansas. The Library of Congress has four of his images in their collection. The University of Kansas Libraries have a collection of his papers.

He took over William Prettyman's studio and eventually published an album of his and Prettyman's work. Some of Cornish's photographs were published along with the work of Thomas Croft (photographer) in the Arkansas City Illustrated.

Cornish left his studio business to his assistant Edith Berroth (1895 - 1989) who carried on the business. Berroth was an assistant from 1912 until his death and operated the studio until her retirement in 1969.

Berroth sold the building to World War II veteran and part owner of the studio Michael M. Marotta on April 25, 1969. She died November 9, 1989. Marotta eventually sold the studio building to Otis Morrow and it is now occupied by law offices.

== Gallery ==
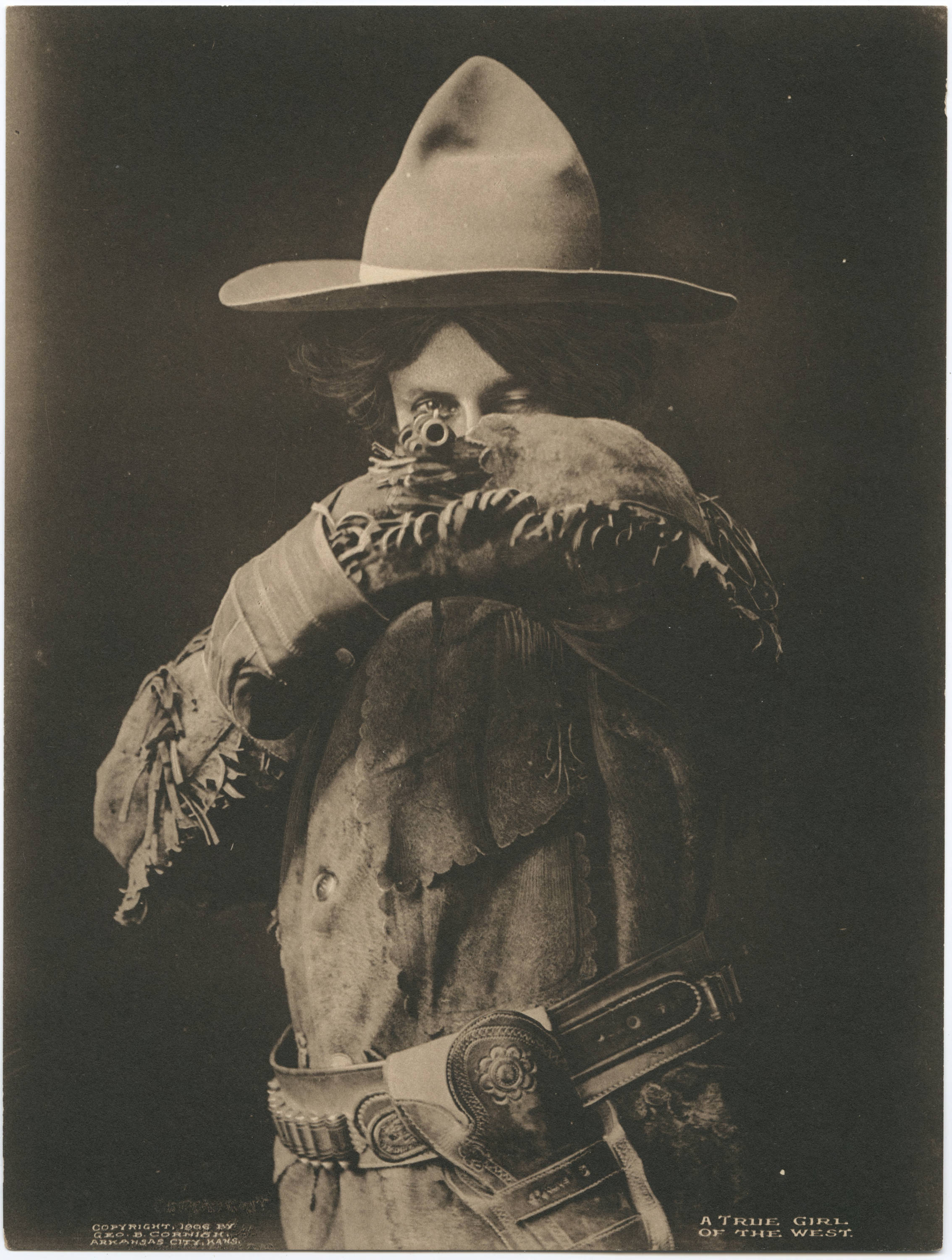

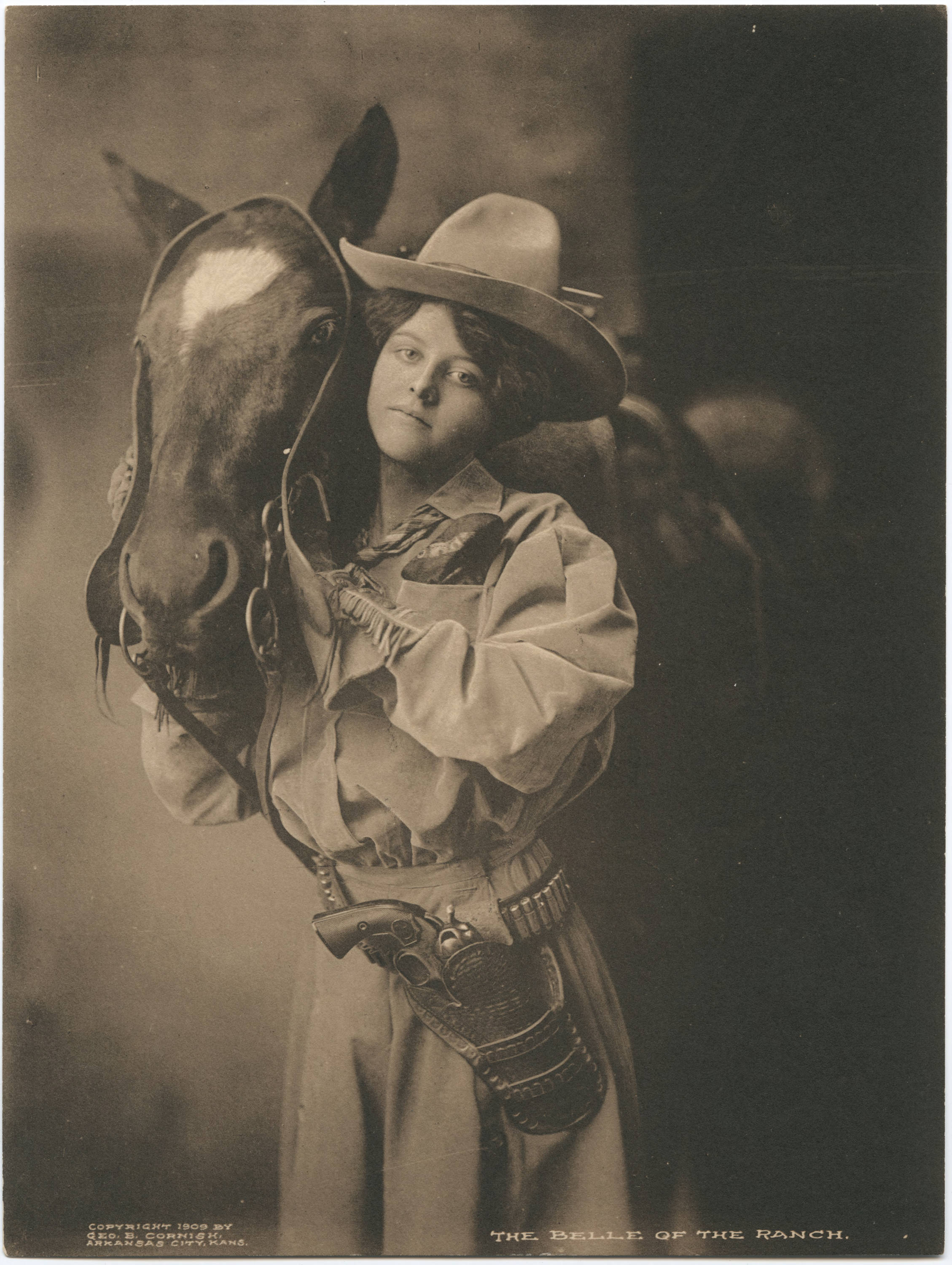

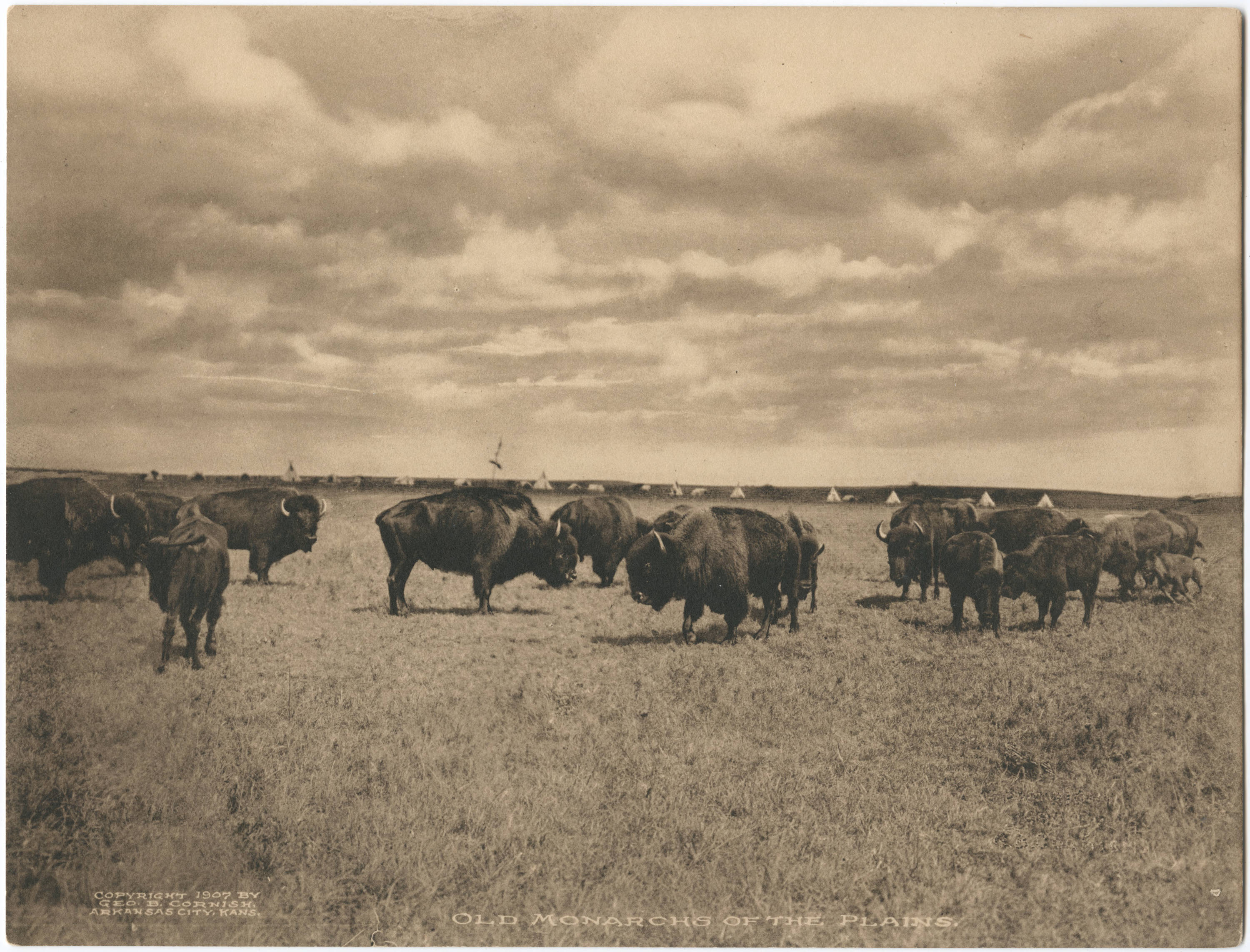

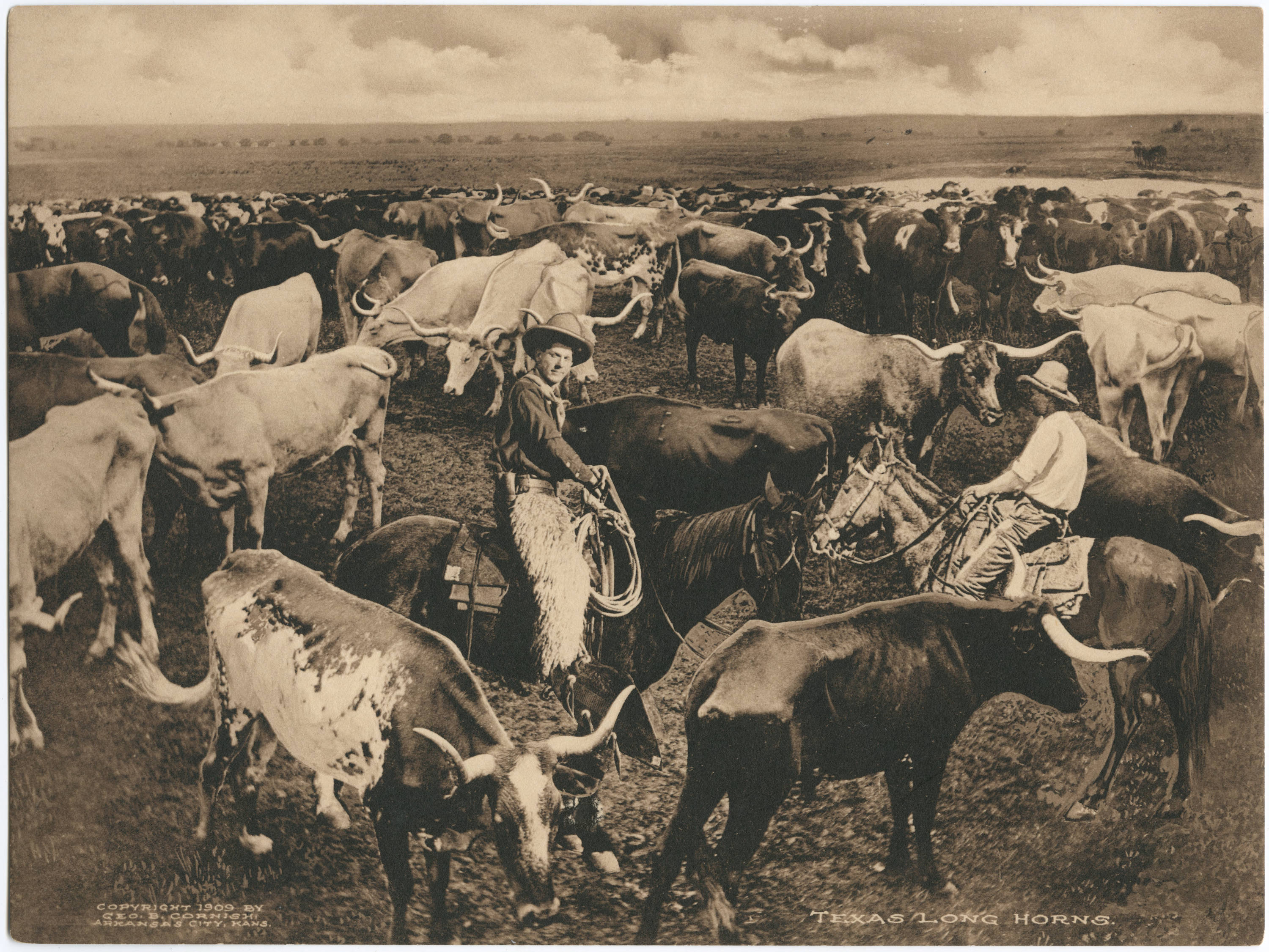

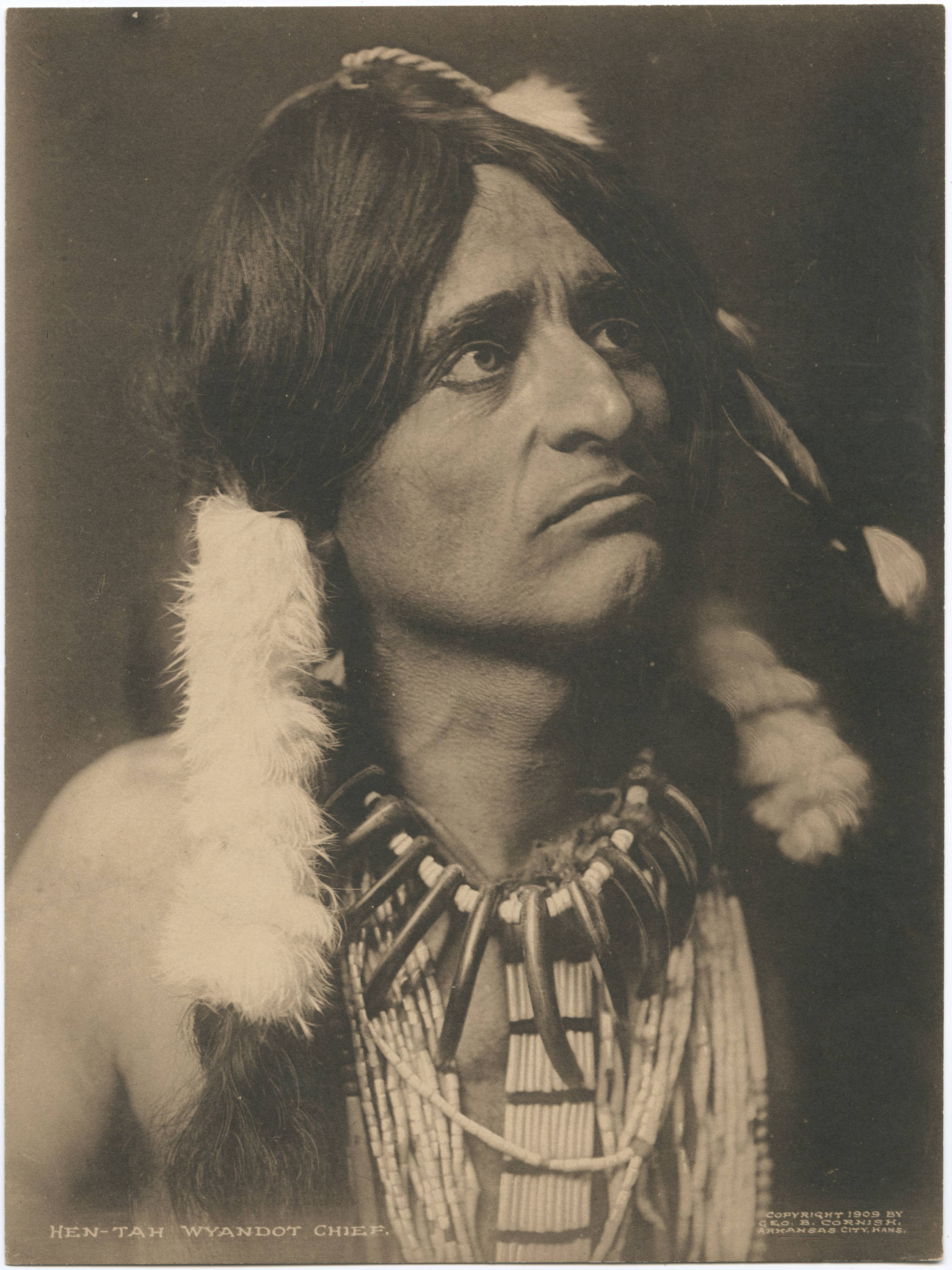
Wyandot chief

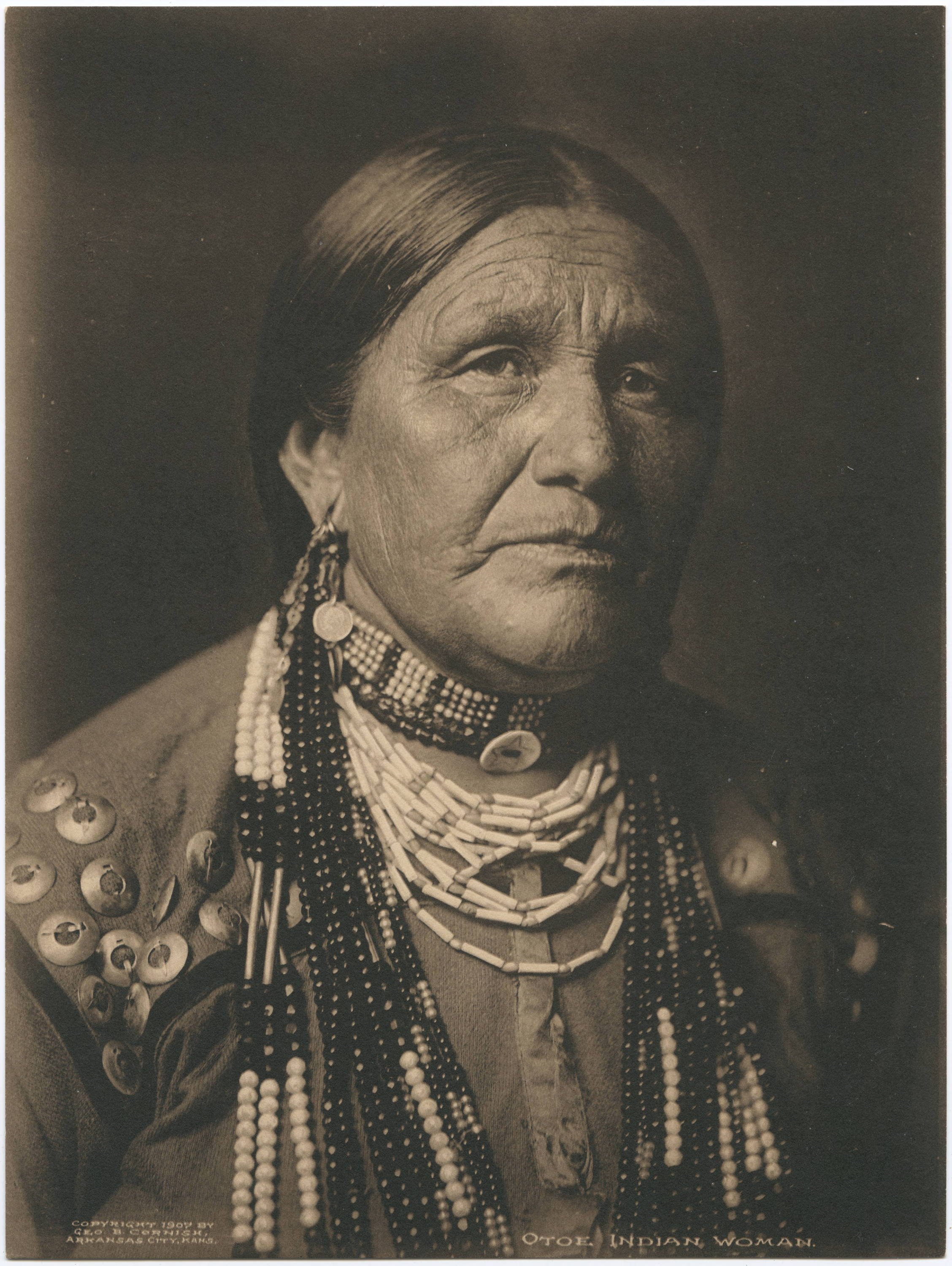

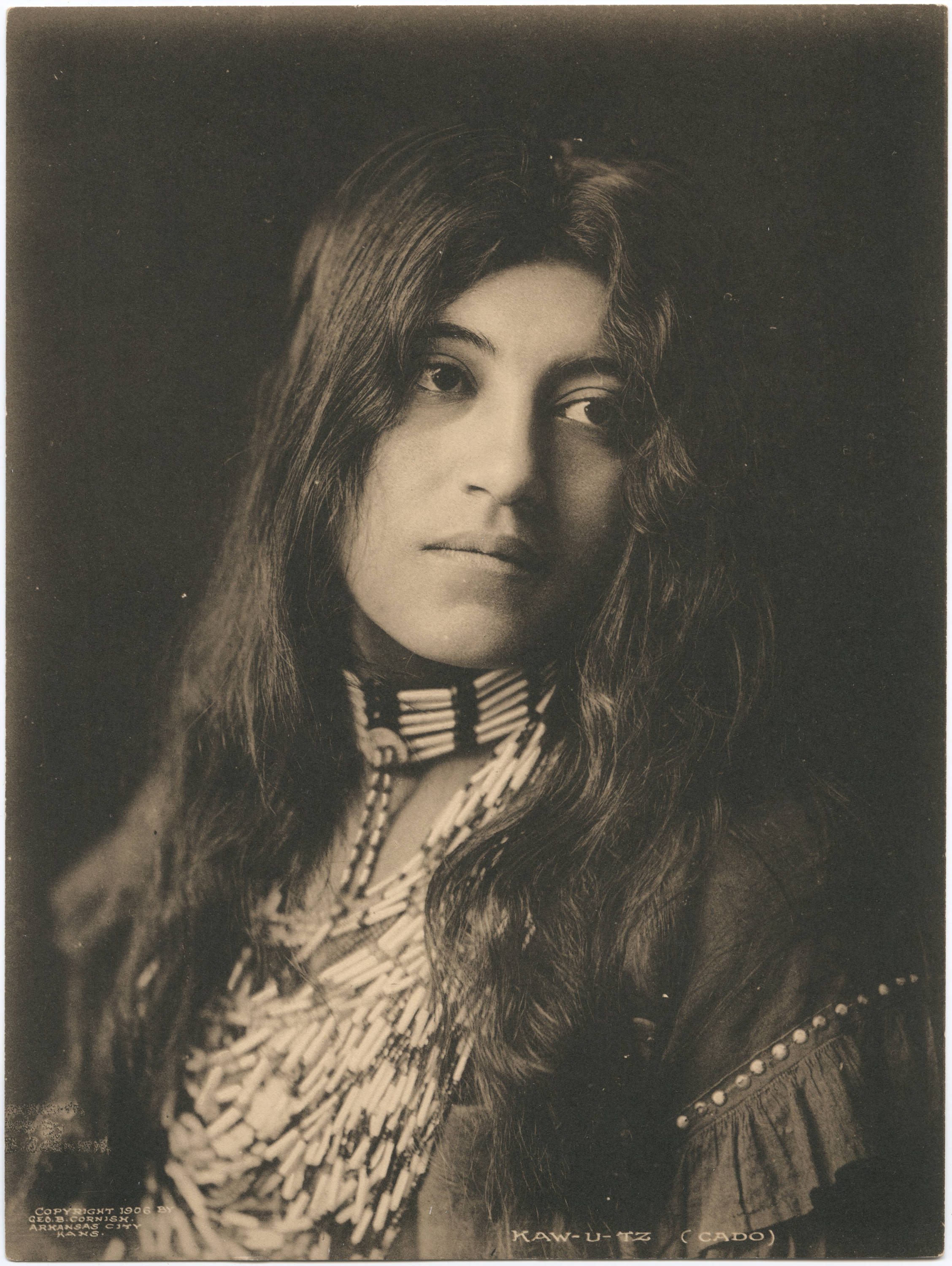

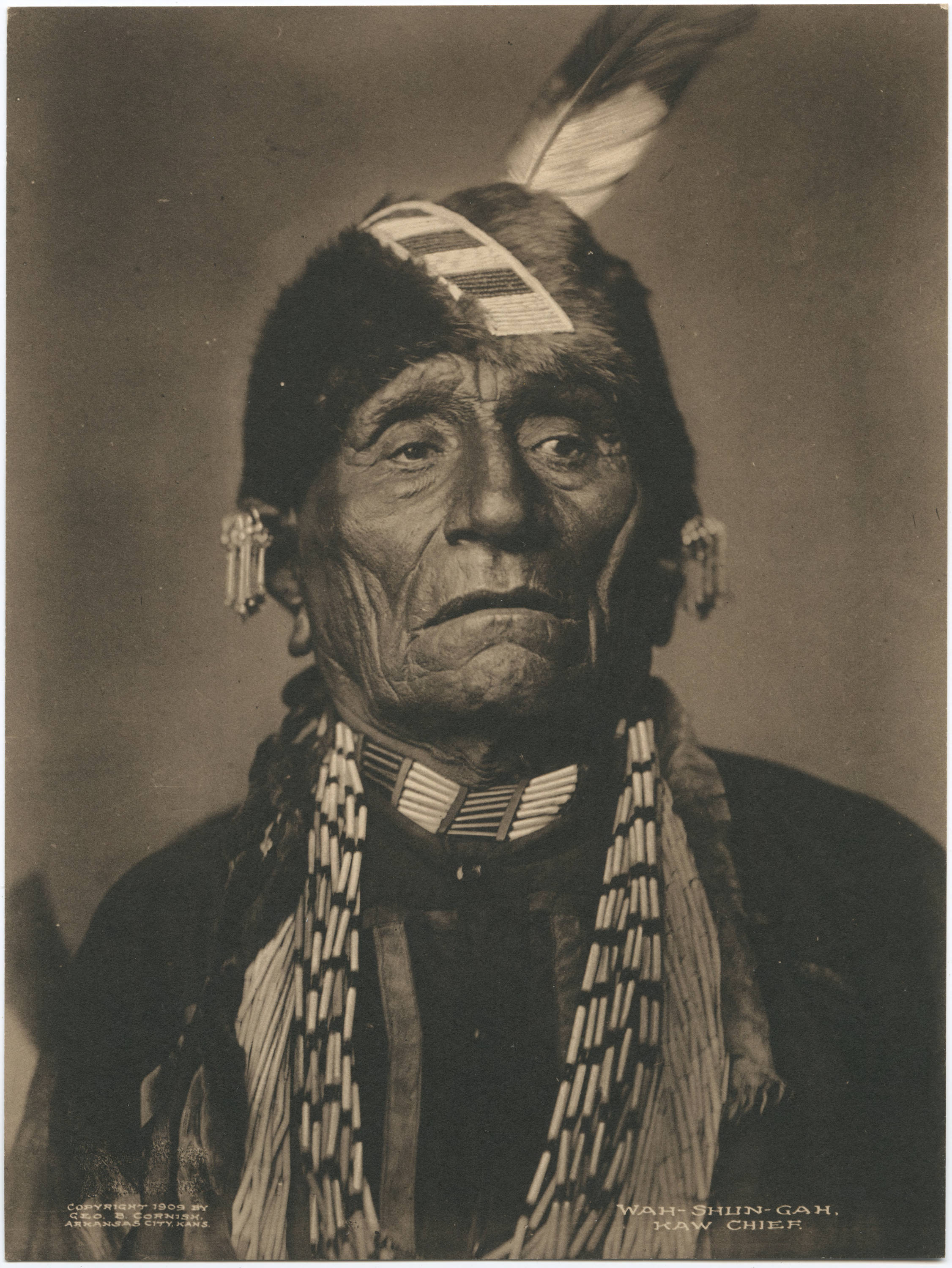

== See also ==
- Edward S. Curtis
