= Pretty Lady =

Pretty Lady may refer to:

- Pretty Lady (album), 1961 album by Les McCann
- "Pretty Lady" (Keith Stegall song), 1985
- "Pretty Lady" (Lighthouse song), 1973
- "Pretty Lady" (Tash Sultana song), 2020
- "Oh, Pretty Lady", song by the Canadian band Trooper
- "Pretty Lady", song from the musical Pacific Overtures
- Pretty Lady, the musical play at the centre of the film 42nd Street

== See also ==
- Pretty Girl (disambiguation)
- Pretty Woman (disambiguation)
