= Preti =

Preti is an Italian surname. Notable people with the surname include:

- Armando Preti (1911–?), Italian footballer
- Francesco Maria Preti (1701–1774), Italian Baroque architect
- Gaetano Preti, Italian artistic gymnast
- George Preti (1944–2020), American chemist
- Gregorio Preti (1603–1672), Italian Baroque painter
- Jean-Louis Preti (1798–1881), French chess writer
- Luigi Preti (1914–2009), Italian politician
- Luis Preti (born 1983), Ecuadorian footballer
- Mattia Preti (1613–1699), Italian Baroque painter

== See also ==
- Pretti (disambiguation)
- Pretty (disambiguation)
