= I. H. Bonsall =

American photographer

- Born: 1833; Ohio
- Died: 1909 (aged 75–76)
- Citizenship: America
- Occupation: Photographer

Isaac H. Bonsall (1833 - 1909) was an early American photographer, settler of Kansas, justice of the peace for Creswell Township, census taker, and U.S. Commissioner for Kansas.

He documented the American Civil War under the command of William S. Rosecrans. Photographer William Prettyman apprenticed with him in Arkansas.

== Personal life ==
Bonsall married Susan Merrill in 1856. He belonged to the Masons. Bonsall was born in Ohio to Joseph and Eliza Bonsall. He served in the volunteer army during the American Civil War photographing maps for the engineering department and photographed war era sights around Chattanooga.

== Recognition ==
The Library of Congress has a photograph attributed to Bonsall in their collection. The Isaac Bonsall Collection of Photographs at The Huntington Library in San Marino, California has 50 of his photographs.

== Gallery ==
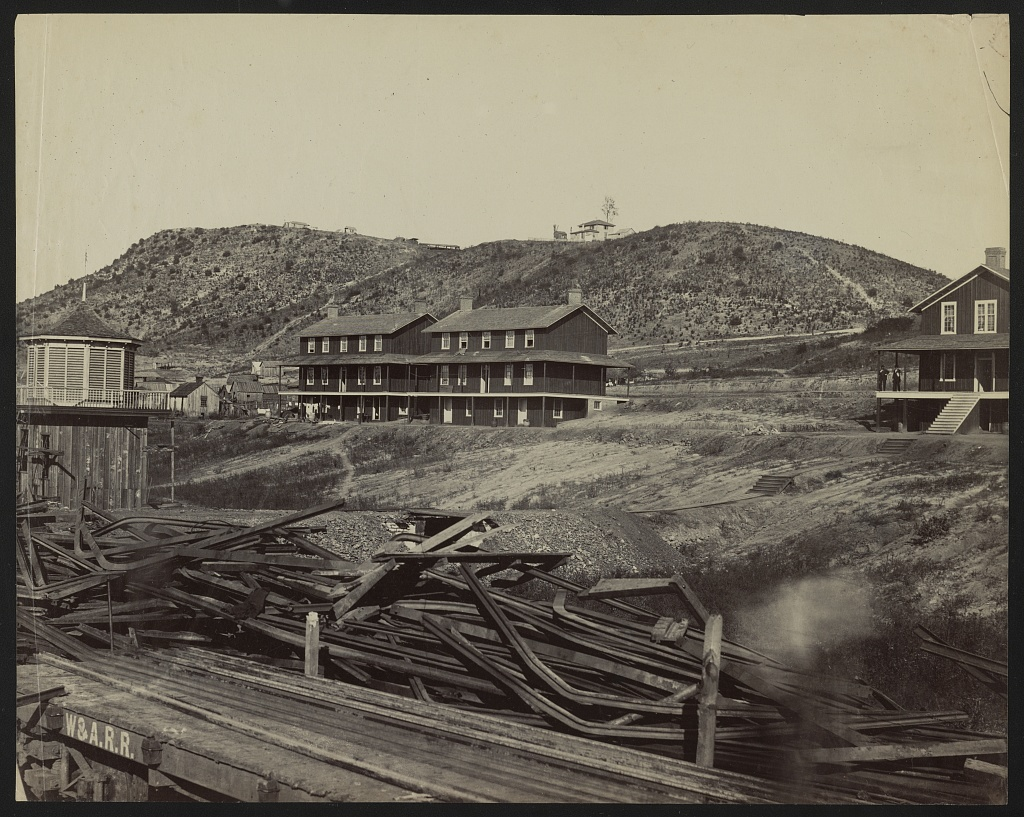

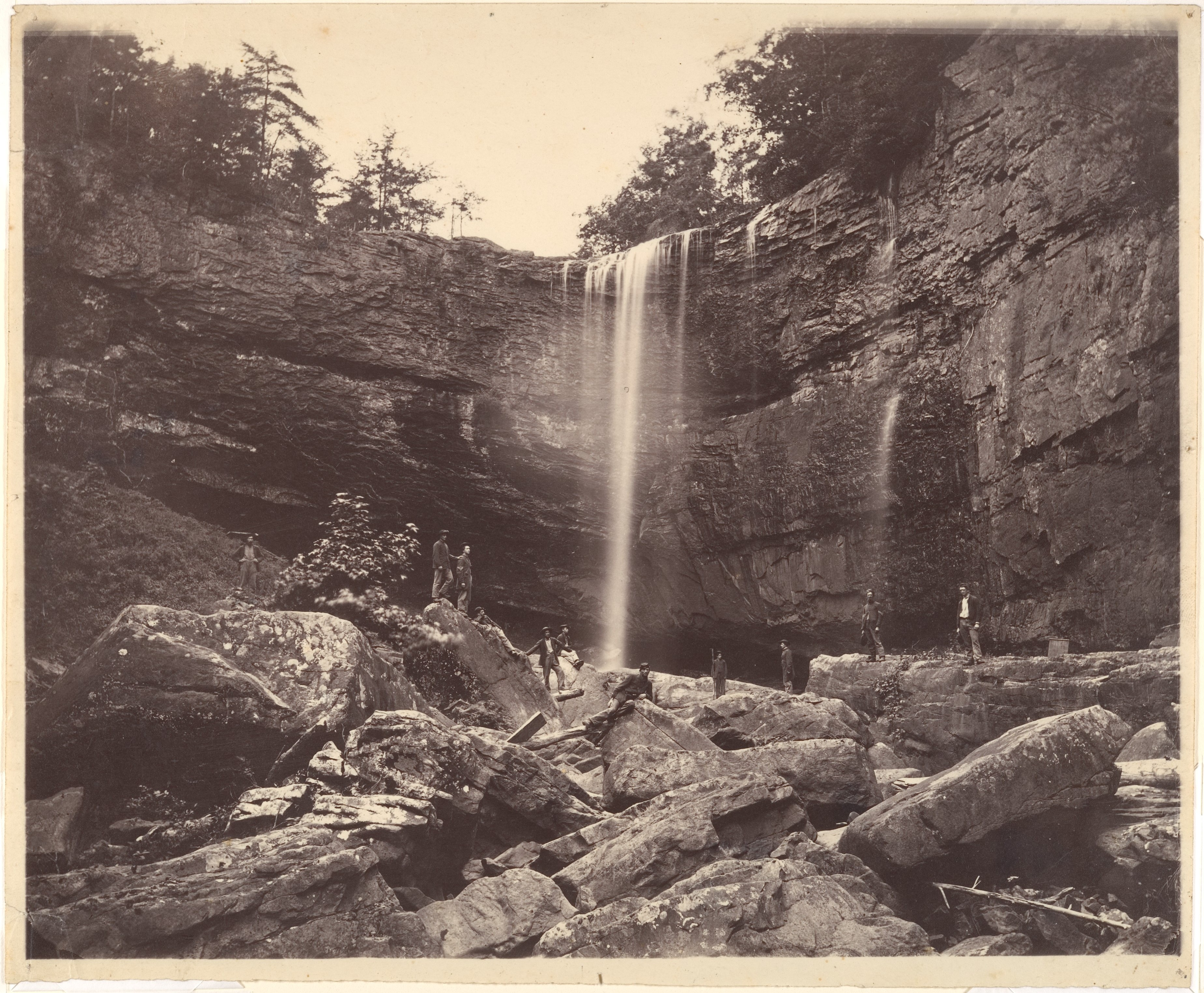

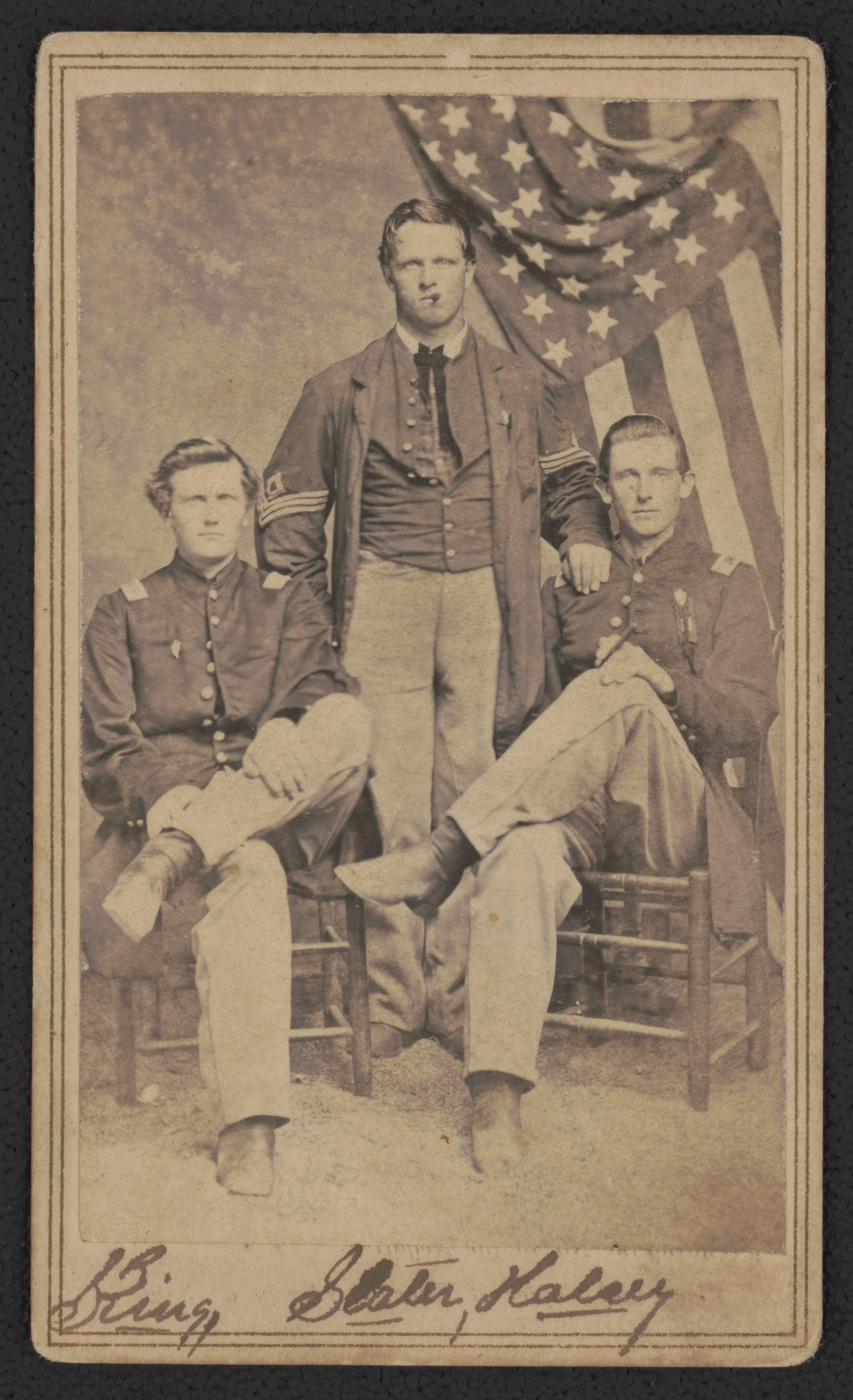

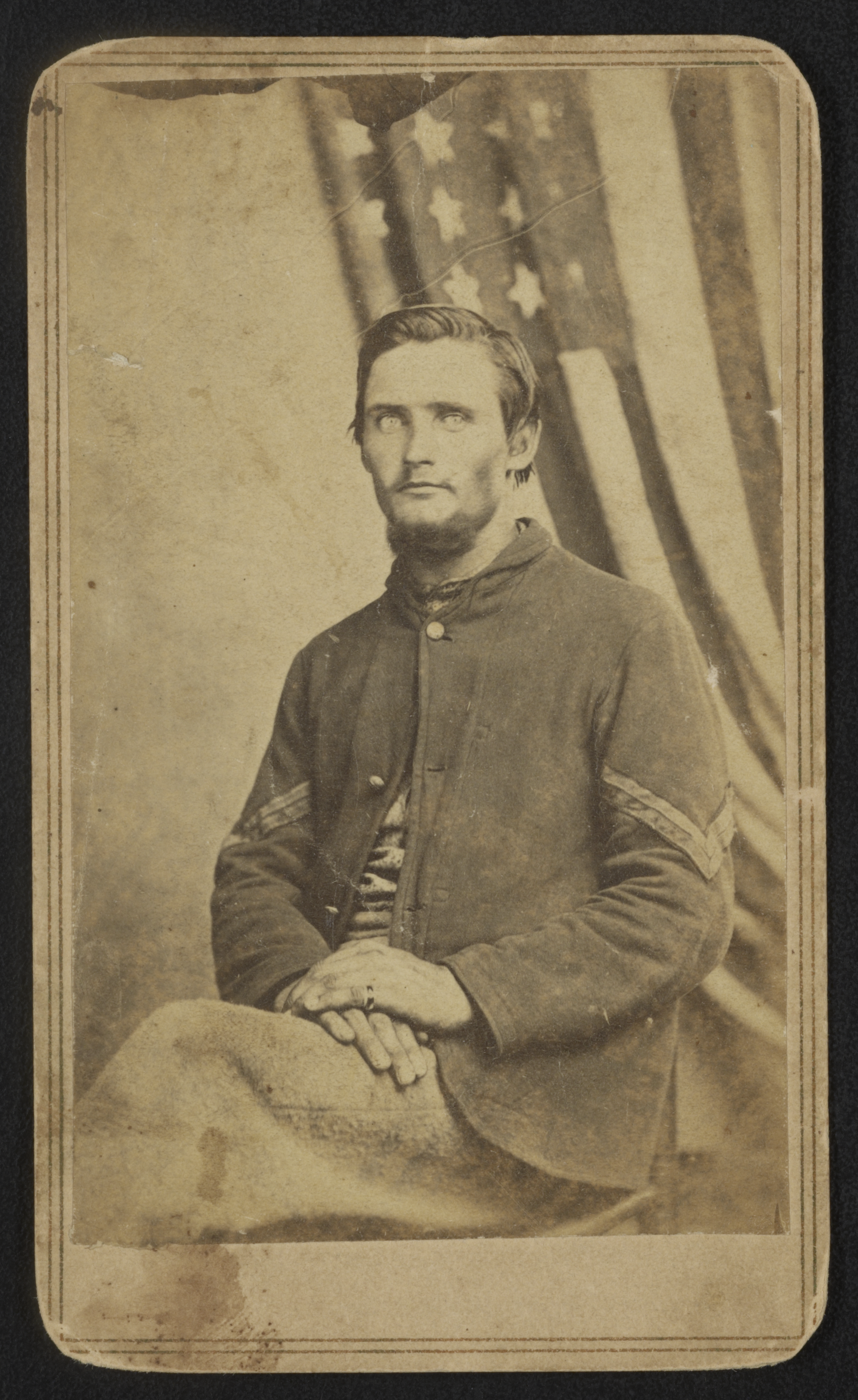

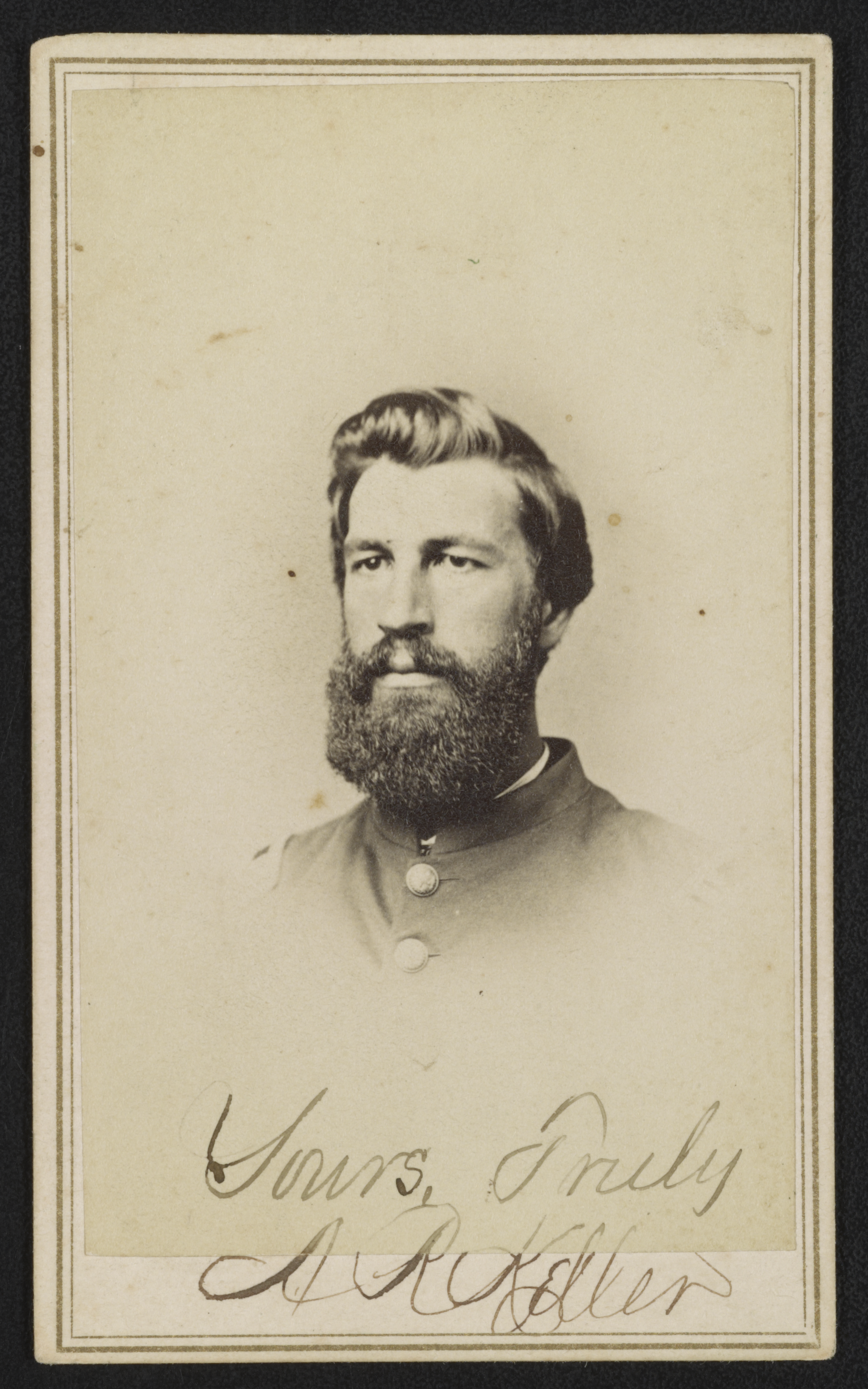

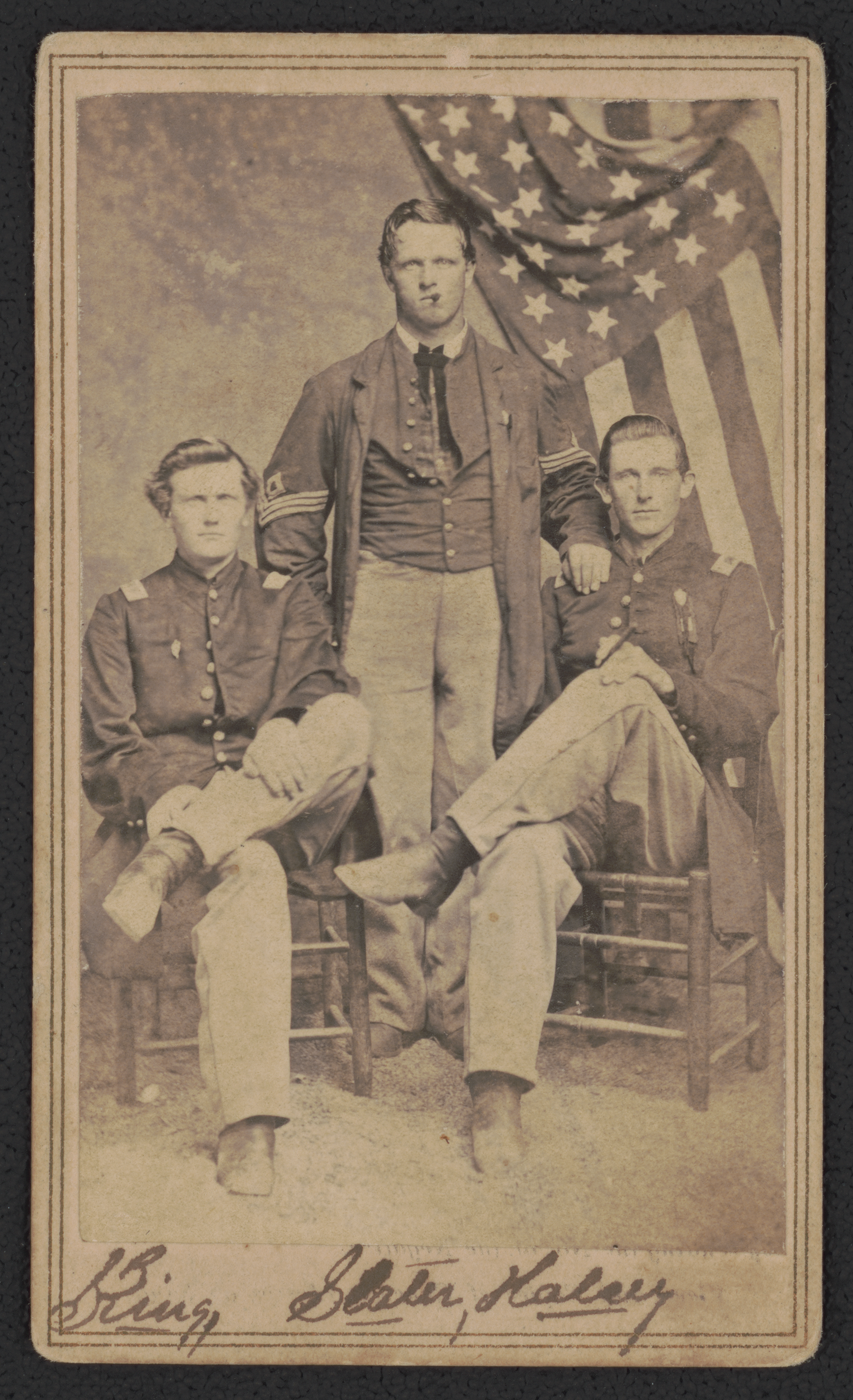
