= Pretty Boy =

Pretty Boy may refer to:

== People ==
- Pretty Boy Floyd (1904–1934), American gangster and bank robber
- Don Covay (1936–2015), American singer
- Larry Hennig (1936–2018), American professional wrestler
- Doug Somers (1951–2017), American professional wrestler
- Floyd Mayweather Jr. (born 1977), American boxer

== Songs ==
- "Pretty Boy" (song), by Isabel LaRosa, 2024
- "Pretty Boy", by 2NE1 from 2NE1, 2009
- "Pretty Boy", by Erreway from Señales, 2003
- "Pretty Boy", by Danity Kane from Welcome to the Dollhouse, 2008
- "Pretty Boy", by Edurne, 2013
- "Pretty Boy", by Janet Jackson from Dream Street, 1984
- "Pretty Boy", by Joji from Nectar, 2020
- "Pretty Boy", by Juniel, 2013
- "Pretty Boy", by M2M from Shades of Purple, 2000
- "Pretty Boy", by Noel Gallagher's High Flying Birds from Council Skies, 2023 (released as a single in 2022)
- "Pretty Boy", by P1Harmony from Duh!, 2025
- "Pretty Boy", by S Club 8 from Sundown, 2003
- "Pretty Boy", by Young Galaxy from Ultramarine, 2013

== Other uses ==
- Pretty Boy (comics), a Marvel Comics character
- "Pretty Boy" (short story), a 2006 Ender's Game story by Orson Scott Card
- Prettyboy Reservoir, Baltimore County, Maryland, US
- Pretty Man, or Pretty Boy, a South Korean romantic comedy television series

== See also ==
- Prettyman (disambiguation)
- Pretty Girl (disambiguation)
