= William Prettyman =

American photographer

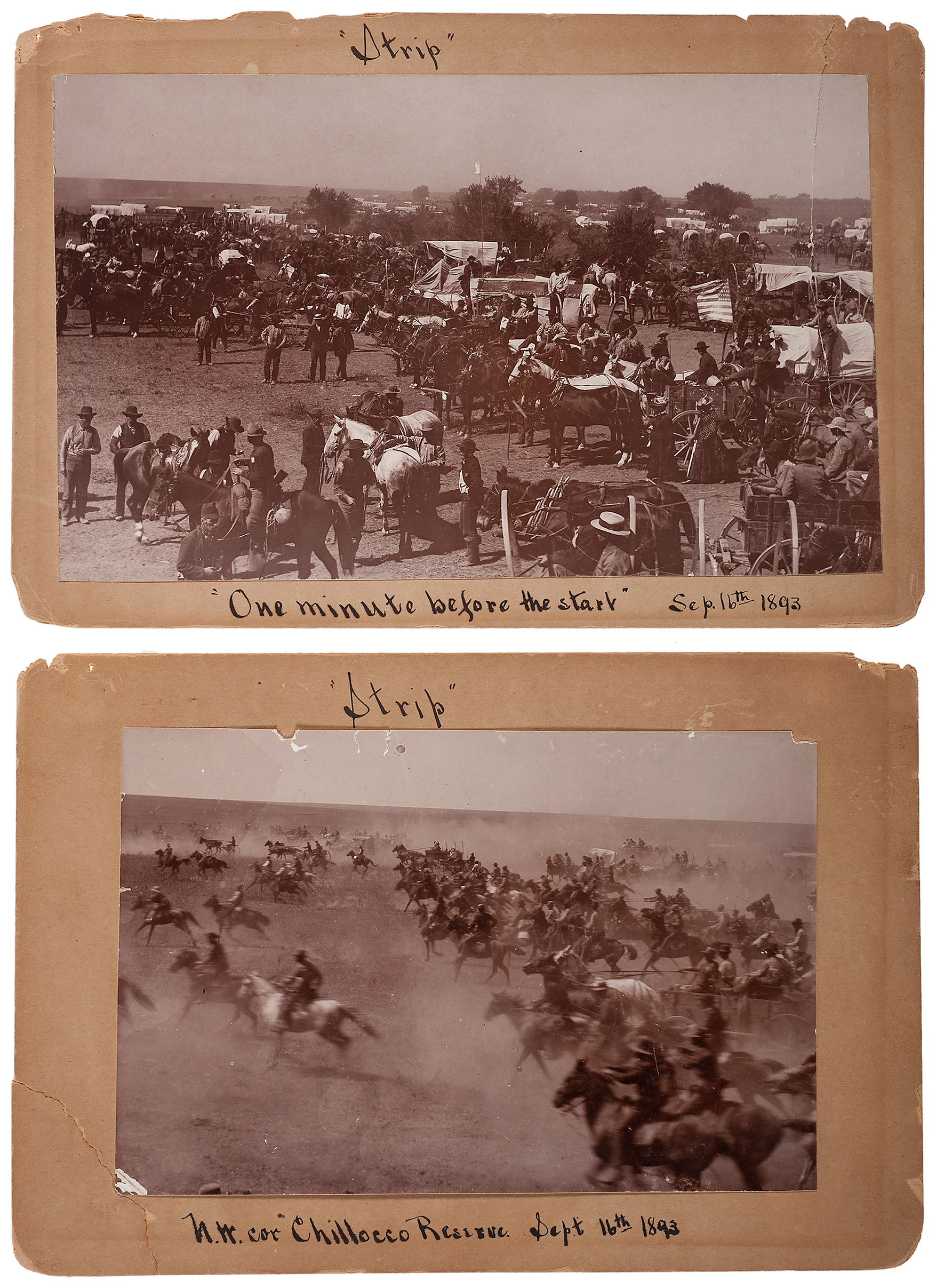
Oklahoma land rush in the Cherokee Outlet photographs (1893) by William S. Prettyman

William S. Prettyman (1858 — 1932) was an early American photographer. According to the Oklahoma Historical Society, he is one of the best known photographers of the American frontier in Oklahoma Territory. He apprenticed with I.H. Bonsall. George Bancroft Cornish eventually took over his studio. The Harvey County Historical Museum has a couple of his photographs. Prettyman was the mayor of Blackwell, Oklahoma. He had a buggy setup he used to photograph Native Americans in situ. He also had a construction built to capture the action of the Cherokee Outlet land run.
