= Pretty Woman (disambiguation) =

Pretty Woman is a 1990 romantic comedy film.

Pretty Woman may also refer to:

- "Oh, Pretty Woman", a song co-written and recorded by Roy Orbison, later covered by Van Halen
  - "Pretty Woman", a remake by Shankar-Ehsaan-Loy and Ravi Khote for the 2003 Indian film Kal Ho Naa Ho
- "Pretty Woman", a song by Robbie Williams from the 2016 album The Heavy Entertainment Show
- Pretty Woman: The Musical, a 2018 musical
- Pretty Women, a song in the 1979 musical Sweeney Todd: The Demon Barber of Fleet Street
- "Oh, Pretty Woman", a song by A. C. Williams recorded on Albert King's 1967 album Born Under a Bad Sign, later recorded by several others including Gary Moore
- "Pretty Woman", The Keith & Paddy Picture Show season 2, episode 3 (2018)

== See also ==
- Pretty Girl (disambiguation)
- Pretty Lady (disambiguation)
