= Danielle LoPresti =

American singer-songwriter

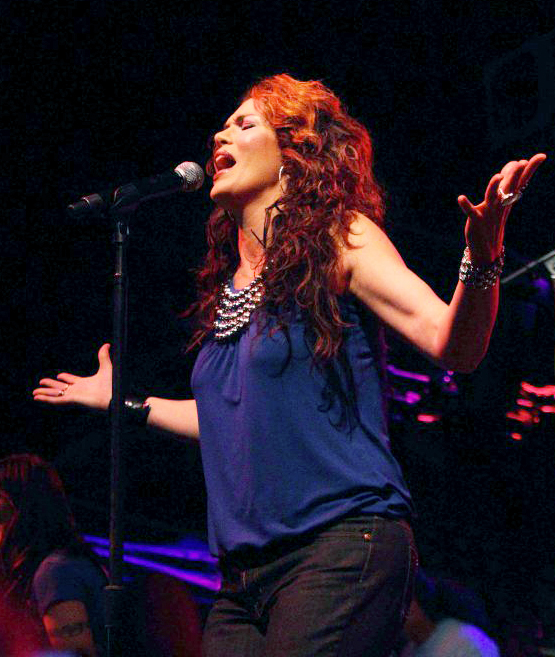
- Danielle LoPresti on stage at San Diego IndieFest 2010

Background information
- Born: January 25, 1969 (age 57); Bellflower, California, United States
- Genres: Rock, pop, soul, jazz
- Occupations: Musician, actress (voice)
- Instrument: Voice
- Years active: 1991–present
- Labels: Say It Records, Trevino Music Group, Universal Music Group
- Website: DanielleAndTheMasses.com

Danielle LoPresti (born January 25, 1969) is an American musician, actress and activist. She is the lead singer of Danielle LoPresti and The Masses, an activist rock band from San Diego, California, and is the co-founder and producer of San Diego IndieFest.

== Early life ==
Danielle LoPresti (born Danielle Marie Lo Preste) is the eldest of three children by San Diego sport-fisherman, Frank Lo Preste and Mary Lou Lo Preste. She was born in Bellflower, CA and raised in San Diego, CA. After she graduated valedictorian from Chula Vista School of the Creative and Performing Arts in 1987, LoPresti accepted a scholarship to United States International University where she studied acting alongside talents such as Jamie Foxx and John Barrowman. She graduated valedictorian from USIU in 1991.

== Career ==
=== Music ===
Upon college graduation, LoPresti put her primary focus on music performance. She fronted the San Diego party band, The Fabulous Mar Dels, from 1991 to 1993 before moving to Los Angeles to pursue songwriting. In 1996, LoPresti co-wrote original music for the Universal Studios motion picture, The Nutty Professor, with André Berry and Worthy Davis, including the end-title track, Homework, which she also performed.

LoPresti next collaborated with producer/ composer Richie Rodriguez on her first original project, Stone7, which combined heavy electronic elements with socially-conscious lyrics that tackled subject matter from racism, child abuse, sexism and more. The Stone7 band included Printz Board, George Pajon Jr. and Tim Izo who found success shortly thereafter as members of The Black Eyed Peas. LoPresti's live performances attracted the interest of several major labels. Interscope A&R executive, Tony Ferguson (No Doubt, Eminem), said that "as an artistic performer, (he's) yet to see better." LoPresti was eventually told after several years of major label courtship that the lyrical content of her music proved too much of a risk for labels to sign her.

In 2000, LoPresti hired Producer and Interscope A&R executive, Michael James, to be Executive Producer of her first release under her new indie label, Say It Records. The debut album and title track, Dear Mr. Penis Head, was inspired by a phone call LoPresti had with an entertainment attorney who used 30 minutes of the phone call to list the numerous reasons he believed she should quit making music. Dear Mr. Penis Head caught the attention of indie music pioneer, Ani DiFranco, who called the album one of her favorites of the year.

She formed the band, Danielle LoPresti and The Masses (named after turn-of-the century activist magazine, The Masses), and has since put out three more full-length albums through the Say It Records label – 22 Mountains (2003), Outloud (2006) and Run With It (2010). LoPresti signed a one album distribution contract for Run With it with Trevino Music Group/ Universal Music Group.

=== Acting ===
LoPresti began professionally acting, singing and modeling as a teenager. At the age of 15, she was signed by the Shamon Freitas Talent Agency and began doing runway and print modeling, as well as live acting/ singing/ dancing for a variety of theater and commercial entities.

As a college student she starred in several USIU Professional Company productions including Man of La Mancha (Dulcinea / Aldonza), Hello, Dolly! (Dolly), The Mikado (Katisha), and The Boy Friend (Madame Dubonnet). Out of college, LoPresti took a few minor television roles (screen and voice), before shifting her focus to music and event production exclusively.

== San Diego IndieFest ==
In November 2004, LoPresti produced the first San Diego IndieFest (originally called San Diego Indie Music Fest) with fellow musicians and collaborators, Alicia Champion and Kelly Bowen. The inaugural event featured 25 independent musicians and bands on three stages, headlined by Jonatha Brooke.

The festival continued to grow on an annual basis. In 2007, the event introduced independent film to the program and officially changed its name to San Diego IndieFest. The event has featured hundreds of bands over the last decade including Cake, Metric, Talib Kweli, Best Coast, Semi Precious Weapons, Juliette Lewis, among others.

In 2014, California State Senator, Toni Atkins, said that she "can attest to the singular effect that IndieFest had on the early years of North Park’s renaissance," and that "cross-cultural activities like IndieFest reach across boundaries and strengthen the social fabric of neighborhoods."

== Personal life ==
LoPresti married her partner of ten years, Alicia Champion, in May 2014. The couple have one child whom they adopted at birth through San Diego County Child Welfare Services in 2011.

The couple divorced in 2024.

In 2013, LoPresti was diagnosed with Stage III Non-Hodgkins Lymphoma and underwent an eight-month-long treatment regimen. She has been in remission ever since.
