= Pretty Creek =

Stream in Hickman County, Tennessee, U.S.

Coordinates: 35.8708987°N 87.5011266°W

Pretty Creek is a stream in Hickman County, Tennessee in the United States. It is a tributary to the Piney River.

According to legend, Pretty Creek was named after the beautiful daughters of a minister who lived on the creek.

== See also ==
- List of rivers of Tennessee
