= Quandra Prettyman =

Professor of African-American studies and English Literature

Professor Quandra Prettyman
- Born: January 19, 1933; Baltimore, Maryland
- Died: October 21, 2021 (aged 88)
- Occupations: Professor of Africana Studies and English, Barnard College

Academic background
- Education: University of Michigan

Academic work
- Discipline: Literature

Quandra Prettyman Stadler (January 19, 1933 – October 21, 2021) was senior associate of Africana Studies and English Literature at Barnard College, New York City, United States. She inaugurated Black literary studies in the United States and university courses examining novel topics that later were adopted broadly by others in her profession. She was described as the champion of Black women's literature by the New York Times.

== Biography ==
Prettyman was born in Baltimore, Maryland on January 19, 1933, and grew up there. She was the daughter of two schoolteachers. She studied history at Antioch College from 1950 to 1954. Her bachelor of arts thesis was on Antioch student publications. She then studied literature the University of Michigan and was graduated in 1957.

She moved to New York in the 1950s and taught English at the College of Insurance and The New School for Social Research.

She taught in the English department at Barnard College from 1970 until her death in 2021, continuing to teach occasionally post-retirement. She was Barnard's first full-time Black faculty member. Prettyman is credited with inaugurating Black literary studies in the USA. The president of Barnard, Sian Beilock, told The New York Times that "[Prettyman] was pushing the canon open, not just at Barnard, but far beyond".

Prettyman received the Walter F. Anderson Award from Antioch College in 2020, for "[advancing] Antioch College's ideals by breaking down racial and ethnic barriers". She is among those listed in Who's Who Among African Americans.

She died on October 21, 2021, at age 88. The obituary tribute to her issued by Barnard noted that Prettyman introduced several courses that were "new to the College (and sometimes new to the field)". Her novel course topics included the Harlem Renaissance; slavery; women and race; literature by Native American, African American, Latina, and Asian American women; and "Early African American literature 1760-1890".

Her family established the Quandra Prettyman Prize in her memory.

== Selected publications ==
- (ed.) The open boat and other stories by Stephen Crane. New York: Scholastic Book Service, 1968
- Poems in Arnold Adoff (ed.) The Poetry of Black America. Harperteen, 1973
- (ed.) Out of our lives: a selection of contemporary Black fiction, Washington, D.C., Howard University Press, 1975 - includes work by Amiri Baraka, Ann Petry, Ernest Gaines, Sherley Anne Williams, and Louise Meriwether
- 'Come Eat at My Table: Lives with Recipes', Southern Quarterly (1992)
- 'The Black Bard of North Carolina: George Moses Horton and His Poetry', African American Review, 33(4), pp. 701–701, (1999)
