= Pretty Baby =

Pretty Baby may refer to:

- Pretty Baby (1950 film), a comedy film featuring Dennis Morgan and Betsy Drake
- Pretty Baby (1978 film), a drama film featuring Brooke Shields
  - Pretty Baby (soundtrack), a soundtrack album from the film
- Pretty Baby: Brooke Shields, a 2023 documentary film
- "Pretty Baby....", an episode of EastEnders
- Pretty Baby (album), an album by Dean Martin
- "Pretty Baby" (Vanessa Carlton song) (2003)
- "Pretty Baby" (Tony Jackson song) (1916)
- "Pretty Baby" (The Primettes song)
- "Pretty Baby", a song by Blondie from Parallel Lines
- "Pretty Baby", a song by Kool & The Gang from As One
