= Pretty Little Liars (disambiguation) =

Pretty Little Liars is an American teen drama television series, with an eponymous spin-off which premiered in 2022.

Pretty Little Liars may also refer to:

- Pretty Little Liars (novel series), by Sara Shepard.
- Pretty Little Liars (franchise), American multimedia teen drama franchise.
- Pretty Little Liars (Indonesian TV series), an Indonesian remake of the 2010 American TV series.
- Tatlı Küçük Yalancılar, a Turkish remake of the 2010 American TV series Pretty Little Liars.
