= Mike Lopresti =

American sportswriter

Mike Lopresti (born 1953) is an American sportswriter for the Gannett News Service.

Lopresti graduated from Ball State University in 1975 and worked for Gannett's Palladium-Item in Richmond, Indiana until he joined the Gannett News Service in 1982. He lives in Richmond, Indiana.

In 2005 he was inducted into the Ball State University Journalism Hall of Fame.
