= Graeme Lloyd Pretty =

Australian anthropologist

Graeme Lloyd Pretty (June 24, 1940 – November 6, 2000) was an Australian anthropologist. Working at the South Australian Museum for over three decades, he worked with and studied many peoples, reaching almost every continent. Pretty assisted in the largest salvaging of ethnographic materials at the time in Papua New Guinea. His work curating and preserving cultural objects stretched beyond his tenure at the South Australian Museum; he worked as a researcher for the South Australian Museum and was a visiting fellow in the Department of Anatomical Sciences at the University of Adelaide. He is considered a "principal figure" in developing the professional field of archaeology in Australia.

== Early life ==
Though he was born in Melbourne, Pretty and his family moved to Richmond, New South Wales, because his father was in the Royal Australian Air Force and was stationed there. He grew up and attended school there. He would make his return to the area in college.

== Educational background ==
Pretty attended Sydney University and received a BA (Hons) in History and Archaeology in 1960. He also received a postgraduate diploma in Education in 1961 from Sydney University.

== South Australian Museum ==
Pretty worked his way up with the South Australian Museum during his 32 years there. About one year after graduating from Sydney University and working at the Koonalda Caves and Nullarbor Plains excavating Pleistocene limestone cave deposits, Pretty was hired as the Assistant Curator for the museum. Studying under Norman Tindale, Pretty undertook several "rescue expeditions" to recover artifacts across Southern Australia. Many of these excavation sites were around the lower River Murray. While on these excavation projects, he sought advice from John Mulvaney, who had recently excavated sites at Fromm's Landing. His relationship with Tindale continued long after his retirement. He was appointed the curator of archaeology in 1965 and stayed in this role until 1973. This position took Pretty across the world, working in the United Kingdom, elsewhere in Europe, and Southeast Asia. Pretty long had an interest in Melanesia and did fieldwork in the area from 1968 to 1969, specifically in Papua New Guinea. Because of these efforts, he was invited back to review Papua New Guinea's Museum and Art Gallery and assist in creating reports and inventory of their cave paintings. He also directed the South Australian Museum in salvaging and returning over 1,000 artifacts to the PNG Museum. 1968 was also the year he began an operation to recover human remains at a surface campsite in Roonka near the River Murray. Potentially, one of his most important contributions to Australian anthropology was his unusual consultation with the Aboriginal people who lived there. Instead of taking the traditional approach, Pretty engaged the community and co-created the project with them. Continuing until 1977, they worked to salvage one of the largest prehistoric Aboriginal skeletons in Australia. This effort was carefully organized and documented and provided a wealth of information on the community. In 1973, Pretty was promoted to Senior Curator of the Human Sciences Collections and then promoted to Senior Curator of Archaeology until he resigned from the position in 1994.

== Leadership roles in curation and anthropology ==
Outside the South Australian Museum, Pretty held roles in the ASSA (Anthropological Society of South Australia) from 1969 to 1973 and the AIATSIS (Australian Institute of Aboriginal and Torres Strait Islander Studies) from 1965 to 2000. During his time with the ASSA, he served in several capacities, including secretary and president.
