= Pretty Girl =

Pretty Girl or Pretty Girls may refer to:

- Pretty Girl (EP), a 2008 EP by Kara, or the title track
- Pretty Girls (album), a 1979 album by Lisa Dal Bello, or the title track
- "Pretty Girls" (Britney Spears and Iggy Azalea song), 2015
- "Pretty Girl" (Clairo song), 2017
- "Pretty Girl" (Ice Spice song), 2023
- "Pretty Girls" (Iyaz song), 2011
- "Pretty Girl" (Jon B. song), 1995
- "Pretty Girl" (Maggie Lindemann song), 2016
- "Pretty Girl" (Rescene song), 2026
- "Pretty Girls" (Wale song), 2009
- "Pretty Girls", by Against Me! from the 2005 album Searching for a Former Clarity
- "Pretty Girls", by Dierks Bentley from the 2014 album Riser
- "Pretty Girl", by The Easybeats from the 1967 album The Best of The Easybeats + Pretty Girl
- "Pretty Girl", by f(x) from the 2013 album Pink Tape
- "Pretty Girl", by Hayley Kiyoko from the Citrine EP, 2016
- "Pretty Girl", by Kanika Kapoor and Ikka Singh, 2018
- "Pretty Girls", by Little Dragon from the 2014 album Nabuma Rubberband
- "Pretty Girls", by Melissa Manchester from the 1979 album Melissa Manchester
- "Pretty Girls", by Neko Case from the 2002 album Blacklisted
- "Pretty Girls", by Reneé Rapp from the 2023 album Snow Angel
- "Pretty Girl (The Way)", by Sugarcult from the 2001 album Start Static
- Pretty Girls (video game series), developed by Zoo Corporation

== See also ==
- Pretty Girls Make Graves, an American art punk band
- Pretty Boys and Pretty Girls (1988 single), single by Book of Love
- Pretty Boy (disambiguation)
- Prettyman (disambiguation)
- Pretty Woman (disambiguation)
