= North American P-51 Mustang =

American WWII-era fighter aircraft

P-51 Mustang
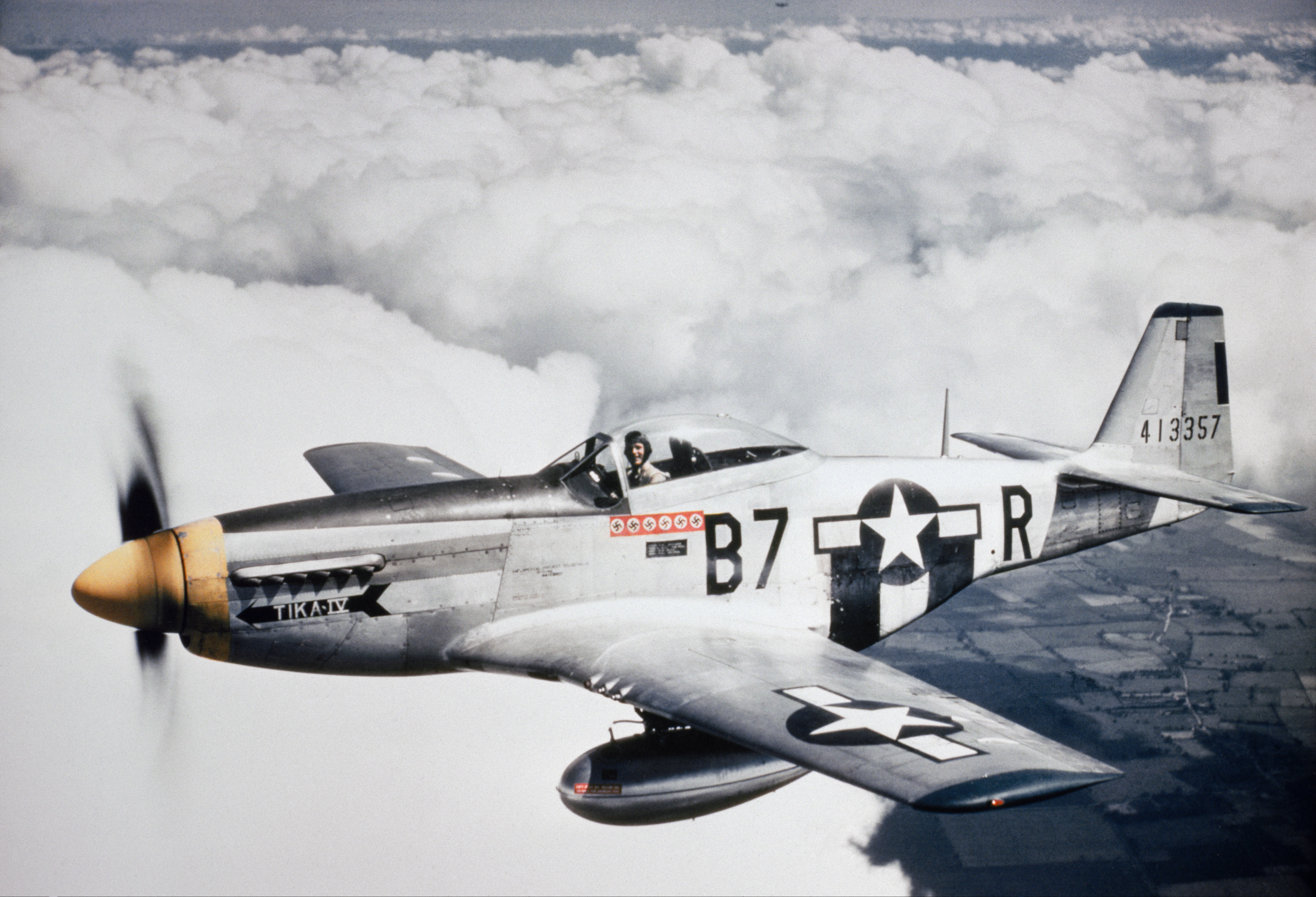
- P-51D nicknamed "Tika IV" of 361st Fighter Group with underwing drop tanks

General information
- Type: Fighter
- National origin: United States
- Manufacturer: North American Aviation
- Status: Retired from service, a number airworthy as warbirds
- Primary users: United States Army Air Forces Royal Air Force; Royal New Zealand Air Force; Royal Canadian Air Force
- Number built: 15,686

History
- Introduction date: 5 January 1942, with the Royal Air Force
- First flight: 26 October 1940
- Retired: Retired from military service 1984 (Dominican Air Force)
- Variants: North American A-36; Rolls-Royce Mustang Mk.X; CAC Mustang; Cavalier Mustang
- Developed into: North American F-82 Twin Mustang; Piper PA-48 Enforcer

The North American Aviation P-51 Mustang is an American long-range, single-seat fighter and fighter-bomber used during World War II and the Korean War, among other conflicts. The Mustang was designed in 1940 by a team headed by James H. Kindelberger of North American Aviation (NAA) in response to a request from the British Purchasing Commission. The commission approached NAA to build Curtiss P-40 fighters under license for the Royal Air Force (RAF). Rather than build an old design from another company, NAA proposed the design and production of a more modern fighter. The prototype NA-73X airframe was completed on 9 September 1940, 102 days after contract signing, achieving its first flight on 26 October.

The Mustang was designed to use the Allison V-1710 engine without an export-sensitive turbocharger or a multi-stage supercharger, resulting in limited high-altitude performance. The aircraft was first flown operationally by the RAF as a tactical-reconnaissance aircraft and fighter-bomber (Mustang Mk I). In mid 1942, a development project known as the Rolls-Royce Mustang X, replaced the Allison engine with a Rolls-Royce Merlin 65 two-stage inter-cooled supercharged engine. During testing at Rolls-Royce's airfield at Hucknall in England, it was clear the engine dramatically improved the aircraft's performance at altitudes above 15,000 ft (4,600 m) without sacrificing range. Following receipt of the test results and after further flights by USAAF pilots, the results were so positive that North American began work on converting several aircraft developing into the P-51B/C (Mustang Mk III) model, which became the first long-range fighter to be able to compete with the Luftwaffe's fighters. The definitive version, the P-51D, was powered by the Packard V-1650-7, a license-built version of the two-speed, two-stage-supercharged Merlin 66, introduced the "bubble" canopy, and was armed with six .50 caliber (12.7 mm) AN/M2 Browning machine guns.

From late 1943 into 1945, P-51Bs and P-51Cs (supplemented by P-51Ds from mid-1944) were used by the USAAF's Eighth Air Force to escort bombers in raids over Germany, while the RAF's Second Tactical Air Force and the USAAF's Ninth Air Force used the Merlin-powered Mustangs as fighter-bombers, roles in which the Mustang helped ensure Allied air superiority in 1944. The P-51 was also used by Allied air forces in the North African, Mediterranean, Italian, and Pacific theaters. During World War II, Mustang pilots claimed to have destroyed 4,950 enemy aircraft. (Note: Among Allied aircraft, the P-51's claimed victory total in World War II was second to the carrier-borne Grumman F6F Hellcat.)

At the start of the Korean War, the Mustang, by then redesignated F-51, was the main fighter of the United States until jet fighters, including North American's F-86 Sabre, took over this role; the Mustang then became a specialized fighter-bomber. Despite the advent of jet fighters, the Mustang remained in service with some air forces until the early 1980s. After the Korean War, Mustangs became popular civilian warbirds and air racing aircraft.

== Design and development ==
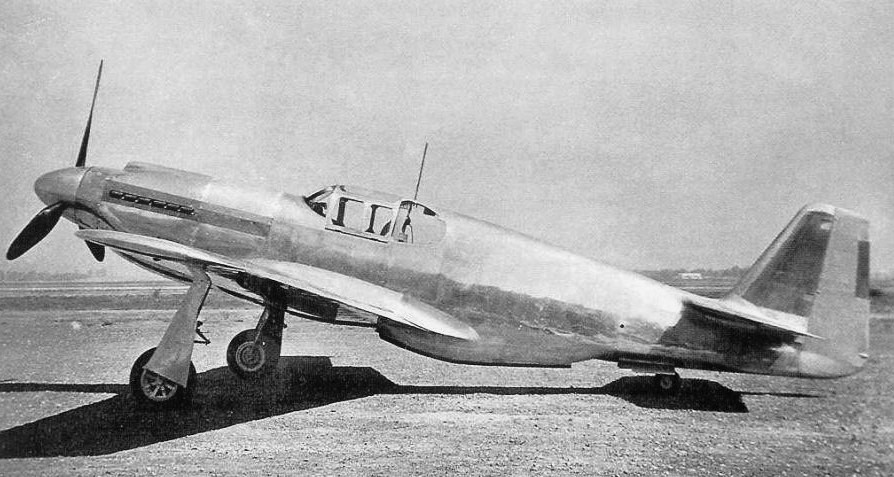
North American NA-73X, with a short carburetor air-intake scoop and the frameless, rounded windshield: On the production Mustang Mk Is, the frameless windshield was replaced with a three-piece unit that incorporated a bullet-resistant windshield.

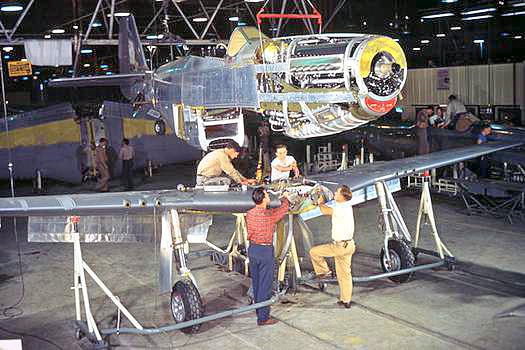
P-51D on the Inglewood assembly line

In 1938, the British government established a purchasing commission in the United States, headed by Sir Henry Self. Self was given overall responsibility for RAF production, research, and development, and also served with Sir Wilfrid Freeman, the Air Member for Development and Production. Self also sat on the British Air Council Subcommittee on Supply (or "Supply Committee"), and one of his tasks was to organize the manufacturing and supply of American fighter aircraft for the RAF. At the time, the choice was very limited, as no US aircraft then in production or flying met European standards, with only the Curtiss P-40 Tomahawk coming close. The Curtiss-Wright plant was running at capacity, so P-40s were in short supply.

North American Aviation (NAA) was already supplying its T-6 Texan (known in British service as the "Harvard") trainer to the RAF, but was otherwise underused. NAA president "Dutch" Kindelberger approached Self to sell a new medium bomber, the North American B-25 Mitchell. Instead, Self asked if NAA could manufacture P-40s under license from Curtiss. Kindelberger said NAA could have a better aircraft with the same Allison V-1710 engine in the air sooner than establishing a production line for the P-40.

John Attwood of NAA spent much time from January to April 1940 at the British Purchasing Commission's offices in New York discussing the British specifications of the proposed aircraft with British engineers. The discussions consisted of free-hand conceptual drawings of an aircraft with the British officials. Self was concerned that NAA had not ever designed a fighter, insisting they obtain the drawings and study the wind-tunnel test results for the P-40, before presenting them with detailed design drawings based on the agreed concept. NAA purchased the drawings and data from Curtiss for £56,000, confirming the purchase with the British Purchasing Commission. The commission approved the resulting detailed design drawings, signing the commencement of the Mustang project on 4 May 1940, and firmly ordering 320 on 29 May 1940. Prior to this, NAA only had a letter of intent for an order of 320 aircraft. Curtiss engineers accused NAA of plagiarism.

The British Purchasing Commission stipulated armament of four .303 in (7.7 mm) machine guns (as used on the Tomahawk), a unit cost of no more than $40,000, and delivery of the first production aircraft by January 1941. In March 1940, 320 aircraft were ordered by Freeman, who had become the executive head of the Ministry of Aircraft Production (MAP) and the contract was promulgated on 24 April.

The NA-73X, which was designed by a team led by lead engineer Edgar Schmued, followed the best conventional practice of the era, designed for ease of mass manufacturing. The design included several new features. (Note: Because the new fighter was designed to a British, rather than an American or USAAC specification, it was allocated a private-venture civil designation instead of the more usual XP- (eXperimental Pursuit) group.) One was a wing designed using laminar flow airfoils, which were developed co-operatively by NAA and the National Advisory Committee for Aeronautics (NACA). These airfoils generated low drag at high speeds. (Note: The Mustang, with its relatively thin laminar flow wing, had a tactical Mach number (the maximum speed at which combat was feasible) of 0.78. This compared favourably with the Messerschmitt Bf 109 and the Focke-Wulf Fw 190, which both had a tactical Mach number of 0.75. The other escort fighters available to the Allies were the Lockheed P-38 Lightning, with a tactical Mach number of only 0.68 and the Republic P-47 Thunderbolt, at 0.71. At the high altitudes at which fighter escorts operated in Europe made this an important performance difference.) During the development of the NA-73X, a wind-tunnel test of two wings, one using NACA five-digit airfoils and the other using the new NAA/NACA 45–100 airfoils, was performed in the University of Washington Kirsten Wind Tunnel. The results of this test showed the superiority of the wing designed with the NAA/NACA 45–100 airfoils. (Note: For more specific information on the P-51's airfoil, known as the NAA/NACA 45–100 series, see)

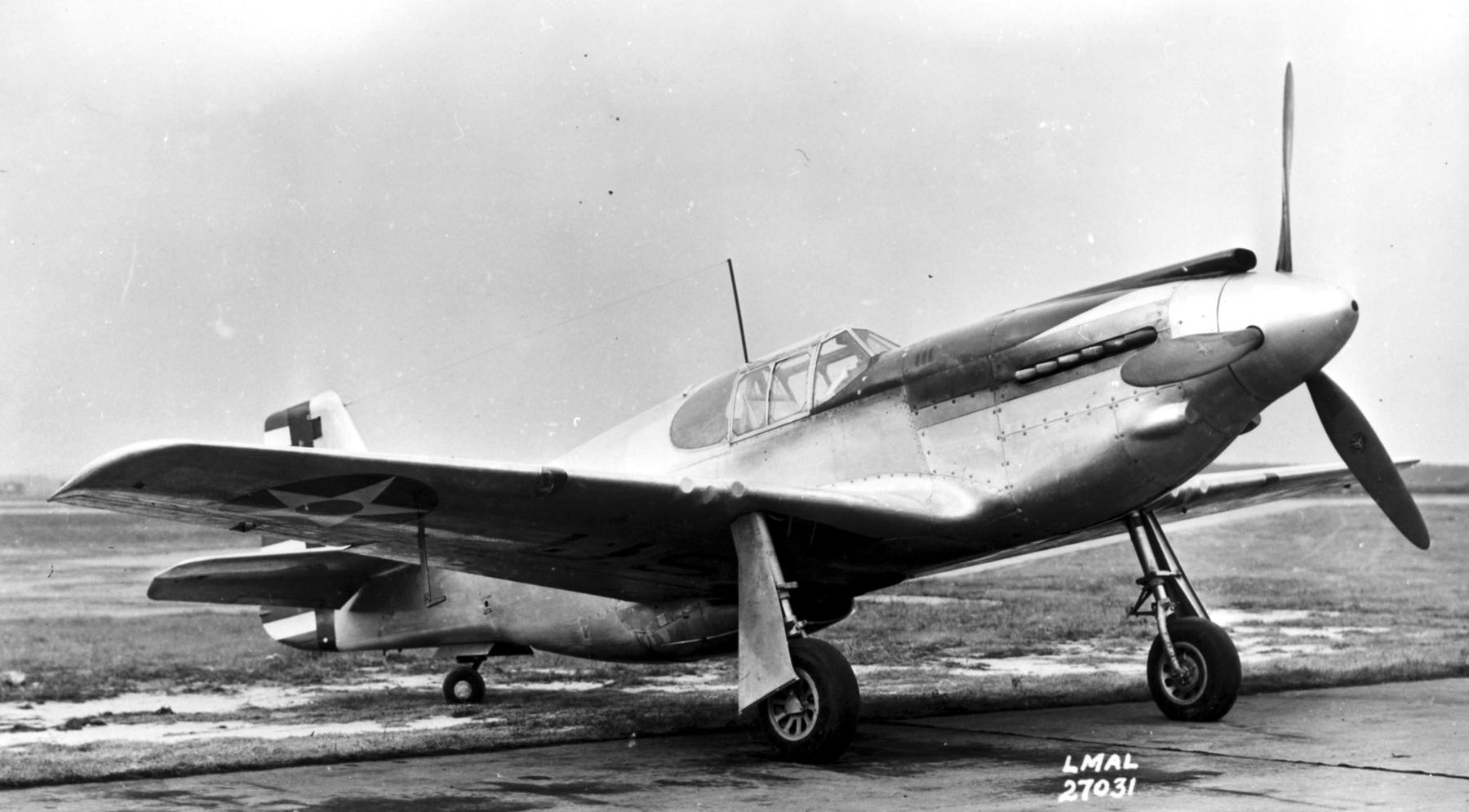
XP-51 41-039 is one of two Mustang Mk I aircraft handed over to the USAAC for testing

The other feature was a new cooling arrangement positioned aft (single ducted water and oil radiators assembly) that reduced the fuselage drag and effects on the wing. Later, after much development, they discovered that the cooling assembly could take advantage of the Meredith effect, in which heated air exited the radiator with a slight amount of jet thrust. Because NAA lacked a suitable wind tunnel to test this feature, it used the GALCIT 3.0 m (10 ft) wind tunnel at the California Institute of Technology. This led to some controversy over whether the Mustang's cooling system aerodynamics were developed by NAA's engineer Schmued or by Curtiss, as NAA had purchased the complete set of P-40 wind tunnel data and flight test reports. The NA-73X was also one of the first aircraft to have a fuselage lofted mathematically using conic sections; this resulted in smooth, low-drag surfaces. To aid production, the airframe was divided into five main sections—forward, center, rear fuselage, and two wing halves—all of which were fitted with wiring and piping before being joined.

The prototype NA-73X was rolled out in September 1940, just 102 days after the order had been placed; it first flew on 26 October 1940, 149 days into the contract, an uncommonly short development period even during the war. With test pilot Vance Breese at the controls, the prototype handled well and accommodated an impressive fuel load. The aircraft's three-section, semi-monocoque fuselage was constructed entirely of 24S aluminum alloy (a type of Duralumin) to save weight. It was armed with four .30 caliber (7.62 mm) AN/M2 Browning machine guns in the wings and two .50 caliber (12.7 mm) AN/M2 Browning machine guns mounted under the engine and firing through the propeller arc using a gun-synchronizing gear. (Note: This was one of the last US applications of gun synchronization – later American single piston-engined fighters, including later models of the Mustang, all had their gun armament concentrated in the wings.)

While the USAAC could block any sales it considered detrimental to the interests of the US, the NA-73 was considered to be a special case because it had been designed at the behest of the British and all dealings were directly between the BPC and NAA, and did not involve the US Army or Wright Field in any way. In September 1940, a further 300 NA-73s were ordered by the MAP. To ensure uninterrupted delivery, Colonel Oliver P. Echols arranged with the Anglo-French Purchasing Commission to deliver the aircraft and NAA gave two examples (41-038 and 41-039) to the USAAC for evaluation. (Note: One of the NA-73s given to the army, s/n 41-038 is still in existence and last flew in 1982.)

The Mustang I (NA-73 and NA-83) and the Ia (NA-91), produced for the British, were not equivalent to the P-51A which was a later model (NA-99). Two British Mustang Is were held back by the USAAF and given the provisional model number XP-51. The USAAF held back 57 Mustang Ia aircraft armed with 4 x 20mm Hispano cannon, from the third British order, converting most of them to tactical reconnaissance aircraft and designating them P-51-2/F6A. North American retained the second aircraft of this batch to help develop the P-51A.

The Allison engine in the Mustang I had a single-stage supercharger that caused power to drop off rapidly above 15,000 feet (4,600 m). This made it unsuitable for use at the altitudes where combat was taking place in Europe. Allison's attempts at developing a high-altitude engine were underfunded, but produced the V-1710-45, which featured a variable-speed auxiliary supercharger and developed 1,150 horsepower (860 kW) at 22,400 feet (6,800 m). In November 1941, NAA studied the possibility of using it, but fitting its excessive length in the Mustang would require extensive airframe modifications and cause long production delays. In May 1942, following positive reports from the RAF on the Mustang I's performance below 15,000 ft, Ronald Harker, a test pilot for Rolls-Royce, suggested fitting a Merlin 61, as fitted to the Spitfire Mk IX. The Merlin 61 had a two-speed, two-stage, intercooled supercharger, designed by Stanley Hooker of Rolls-Royce. Both the Merlin 61 and V-1710-39 were capable of about 1,570 horsepower (1,170 kW) war emergency power at relatively low altitudes, but the Merlin developed 1,390 horsepower (1,040 kW) at 23,500 feet (7,200 m) versus the Allison's 1,150 horsepower (860 kW) at 11,800 feet (3,600 m), delivering an increase in top speed from 390 mph (340 kn; 630 km/h) at ~15,000 feet (4,600 m) to an estimated 440 mph (380 kn; 710 km/h) at 28,100 feet (8,600 m). In the end the Merlin 61 was never fitted to the Mustang X, (or any other Mustang). The 65 series (a medium altitude engine) was fitted to all Mustang X prototypes.

Initially, the Mustang's steadfast champion, USAAC/F Assistant Air Attaché Major Thomas Hitchcock, was concerned that the USAAF had little or no interest in the potential of the P-51A and its development with the Merlin engine. He wrote: "Its development in this theatre has suffered for various reasons. Sired by the English out of an American mother, the Mustang has no parent in the Army Air Corps to appreciate and push its good points. It does not fully satisfy good people on both sides of the Atlantic who seem more interested in pointing with pride to the development of a 100% national product..."

Nevertheless, during the British service development program of the Mustang I at Rolls-Royce's airfield at Hucknall, a close relationship was developed between NAA, the RAF Air Fighting Development Unit and Rolls-Royce Flight Test Establishment at Hucknall.

Following extensive communication between Hitchcock (based in England), Rolls Royce engineers and Phillip Legarra at NAA regarding the promising outlook of a Merlin Mustang, along with the subsequent work in progress by Rolls Royce on the Mustang X, NAA representatives including Mustang designer Schmued visited the UK to examine and discuss the project in detail.

The promising calculations and modification progress by Rolls Royce led in July 1942 to a contract being let for two NAA Merlin prototypes, briefly designated XP-78, but soon to become the XP-51B. Based on the Packard V-1650-3 duplicating the Merlin 61's performance, NAA estimated for the XP-78 a top speed of 445 mph (387 kn; 716 km/h) at 28,000 feet (8,500 m), and a service ceiling of 42,000 feet (13,000 m).

Initial flights of what was known to Rolls-Royce as the Mustang X were completed at Hucknall in October 1942.

The first flight of the US version, designated XP-51B took place in November 1942, but the USAAF had become so interested in the Merlin Mustang project that an initial contract for 400 aircraft was placed three months beforehand in August. The conversion led to production of the P-51B beginning at NAA's Inglewood, California, plant in June 1943, and P-51s started to become available to the 8th and 9th air forces in the winter of 1943–1944. Conversion to the two-stage supercharged and intercooled Merlin 60 series, over 350 lb (160 kg) heavier than the single-stage Allison, driving a four-bladed Hamilton Standard propeller, required moving the wing slightly forward to correct the aircraft's center of gravity. After the USAAF, in July 1943, directed fighter aircraft manufacturers to maximize internal fuel capacity, NAA calculated the P-51B's center of gravity to be forward enough to include an additional 85 US gal (320 L; 71 imp gal) fuel tank in the fuselage behind the pilot, greatly increasing the aircraft's range over that of the earlier P-51A. NAA incorporated the tank in the production of the P-51B-10, and supplied kits to retrofit it to all existing P-51Bs.

== Operational history ==
=== United Kingdom operational service ===
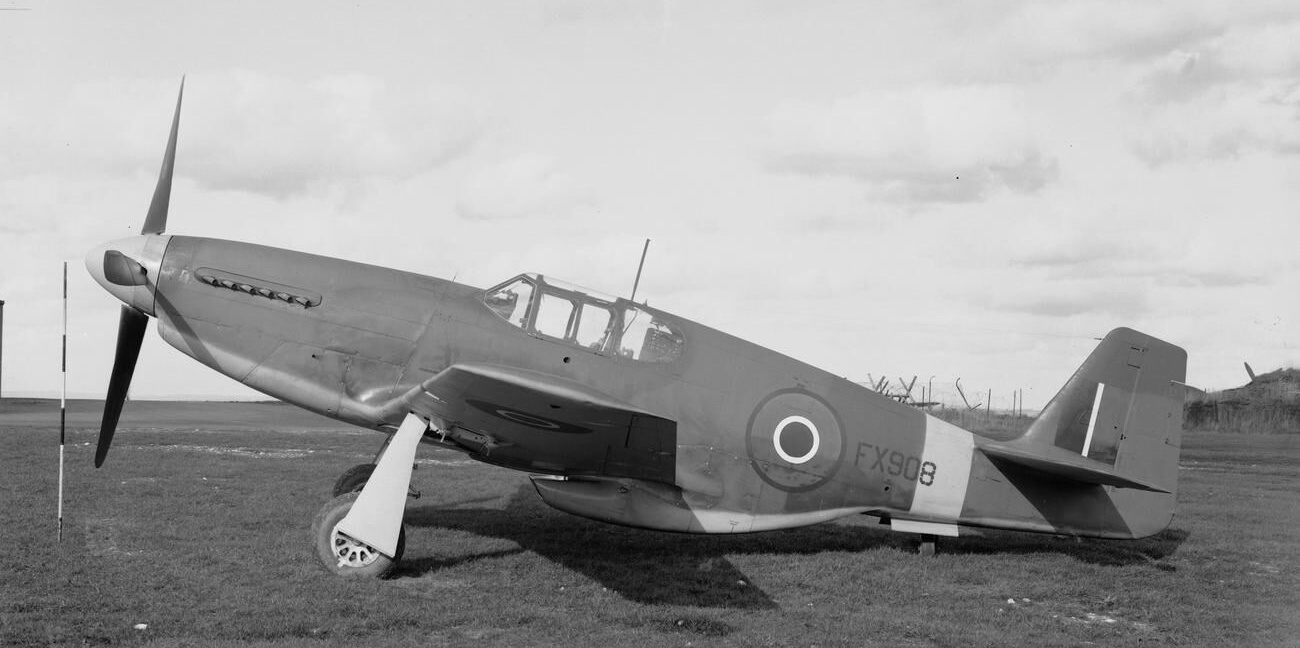
A Royal Air Force North American Mustang Mk III (FX908) on the ground at Hucknall

The Mustang was initially developed for the RAF, which was its first user. As the first Mustangs were built to British requirements, these aircraft used factory numbers and were not P-51s; the order comprised 320 NA-73s, followed by 300 NA-83s, all of which were designated Mustang Mark I by the RAF. The first RAF Mustangs supplied under Lend-Lease were 93 Mk Ia designated as P-51s by the USAAF, followed by 50 P-51As used as Mustang Mk IIs. Aircraft supplied to Britain under Lend-Lease were required for accounting purposes to be on the USAAC's books before they could be supplied to Britain, but the British Aircraft Purchasing Commission signed its first contract for the North American NA-73 on 24 April 1940, before Lend-Lease was in effect.

After the arrival of the initial aircraft in the UK in October 1941, the first squadron of Mustang Mk Is entered service in January 1942, the first being No. 26 Squadron RAF. Due to poor high-altitude performance, the Mustangs were used by Army Co-operation Command, rather than Fighter Command, and were used for tactical reconnaissance and ground-attack duties. On 10 May 1942, Mustangs first flew over France, near Berck-sur-Mer. On 27 July 1942, 16 RAF Mustangs undertook their first long-range reconnaissance mission over Germany. During the amphibious Dieppe Raid on the French coast (19 August 1942), four British and Canadian Mustang squadrons, including 26 Squadron, saw action covering the assault on the ground. By 1943–1944, British Mustangs were used extensively to seek out V-1 flying bomb sites. The last RAF Mustang Mk I and Mustang Mk II aircraft were struck off charge in 1945.

Army Co-operation Command used the Mustang's superior speed and long range to conduct low-altitude "Rhubarb" raids over continental Europe, sometimes penetrating German airspace. The V-1710 engine ran smoothly at 1,100 rpm, versus 1,600 for the Merlin, enabling long flights over water at 50 ft (15 m) altitude before approaching the enemy coastline. Over land, these flights followed a zig-zag course, turning every six minutes to foil enemy attempts at plotting an interception. During the first 18 months of Rhubarb raids, RAF Mustang Mk.Is and Mk.Ias destroyed or heavily damaged 200 locomotives, over 200 canal barges, and an unknown number of enemy aircraft parked on the ground, for a loss of eight Mustangs. At sea level, the Mustangs were able to outrun all enemy aircraft encountered. The RAF gained a significant performance enhancement at low altitude by removing or resetting the engine's manifold pressure regulator to allow overboosting, raising output as high as 1,780 horsepower at 70 in Hg. In December 1942, Allison approved only 1,570 horsepower at 60 in Hg manifold pressure for the V-1710-39.

The RAF later operated 308 P-51Bs and 636 P-51Cs, which were known in RAF service as Mustang Mk IIIs; the first units converted to the type in late 1943 and early 1944. Mustang Mk III units were operational until the end of World War II, though many units had already converted to the Mustang Mk IV (P-51D) and Mk IVa (P-51K) (828 in total, comprising 282 Mk IV and 600 Mk IVa). As all except the earliest aircraft were obtained under Lend-Lease, all Mustang aircraft still on RAF charge at the end of the war were either returned to the USAAF "on paper" or retained by the RAF for scrapping. The last RAF Mustangs were retired from service in 1947.

=== US operational service ===
==== Prewar theory ====
Prewar doctrine was based on the idea "the bomber will always get through". Despite RAF and Luftwaffe experience with daylight bombing, the USAAF still incorrectly believed in 1942 that tightly packed formations of bombers would have so much firepower that they could fend off fighters on their own. Fighter escort was a low priority, but when the concept was discussed in 1941, the Lockheed P-38 Lightning was considered to be most appropriate, as it had the speed and range. Another school of thought favored a heavily up-armed "gunship" conversion of a strategic bomber. A single-engined, high-speed fighter with the range of a bomber was thought to be an engineering impossibility.

==== Eighth Air Force bomber operations 1942–1943 ====
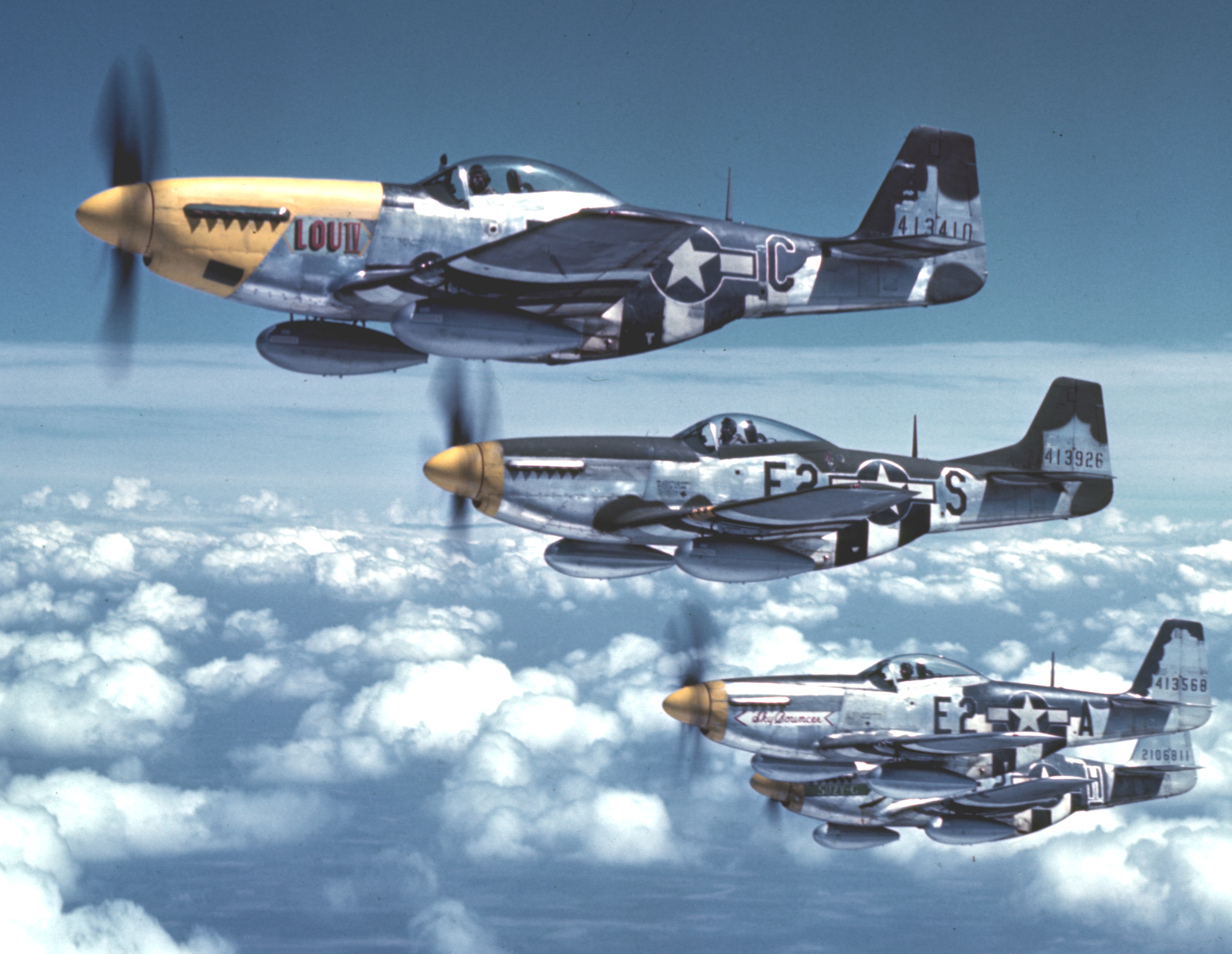
P-51 Mustangs of the 375th Fighter Squadron, Eighth Air Force mid-1944

The 8th Air Force started operations from Britain in August 1942. At first, because of the limited scale of operations, no conclusive evidence showed American doctrine was failing. In the 26 operations flown to the end of 1942, the loss rate had been under 2%.

In January 1943, at the Casablanca Conference, the Allies formulated the Combined Bomber Offensive (CBO) plan for "round-the-clock" bombing – USAAF daytime operations complementing the RAF nighttime raids on industrial centers. In June 1943, the Combined Chiefs of Staff issued the Pointblank Directive to destroy the Luftwaffe's capacity before the planned invasion of Europe, putting the CBO into full implementation. German daytime fighter efforts were, at that time, focused on the Eastern Front and several other distant locations. Initial efforts by the 8th met limited and unorganized resistance, but with every mission, the Luftwaffe moved more aircraft to the west and quickly improved their battle direction. In late 1943, the 8th Air Force's heavy bombers conducted a series of deep penetration raids into Germany, beyond the range of escort fighters. The Schweinfurt–Regensburg mission in August lost 60 B-17s of a force of 376, the 14 October attack lost 77 of a force of 291—26% of the attacking force.

For the US, the very concept of self-defending bombers was called into question, but instead of abandoning daylight raids and turning to night bombing, as the RAF suggested, they chose other paths; at first, bombers converted to gunships (the Boeing YB-40) were believed to be able to escort the bomber formations, but when the concept proved to be unsuccessful, thoughts then turned to the Lockheed P-38 Lightning. In early 1943, the USAAF also decided that the Republic P-47 Thunderbolt and P-51B be considered for the roles of smaller escort fighters, and in July, a report stated that the P-51B was "the most promising plane" with an endurance of 4 hours 45 minutes with the standard internal fuel of 184 US gallons (700 L) plus 150 US gallons (570 L) carried externally. In August, a P-51B was fitted with an extra internal 184-US-gallon (700 L) tank, but problems with longitudinal stability occurred, so some compromises in performance with the full tank were made. Since the fuel from the fuselage tank was used during the initial stages of a mission, the fuel tank would be fitted in all Mustangs destined for VIII Fighter Command.

==== P-51 introduction ====
The P-51 Mustang was a solution to the need for an effective bomber escort. It used a common, reliable engine and had internal space for a larger-than-average fuel load. With external fuel tanks, it could accompany the bombers from England to Germany and back.

By the time the Pointblank offensive resumed in early 1944, matters had changed. Bomber escort defenses were initially layered, using the shorter-range P-38s and P-47s to escort the bombers during the initial stages of the raid before handing over to the P-51s when they were forced to turn for home. This provided continuous coverage during the raid. The Mustang was so clearly superior to earlier US designs that the 8th Air Force began to steadily switch its fighter groups to the Mustang, first swapping arriving P-47 groups to the 9th Air Force in exchange for those that were using P-51s, then gradually converting its Thunderbolt and Lightning groups. By the end of 1944, 14 of its 15 groups flew Mustangs.

==== Fighting the Luftwaffe ====
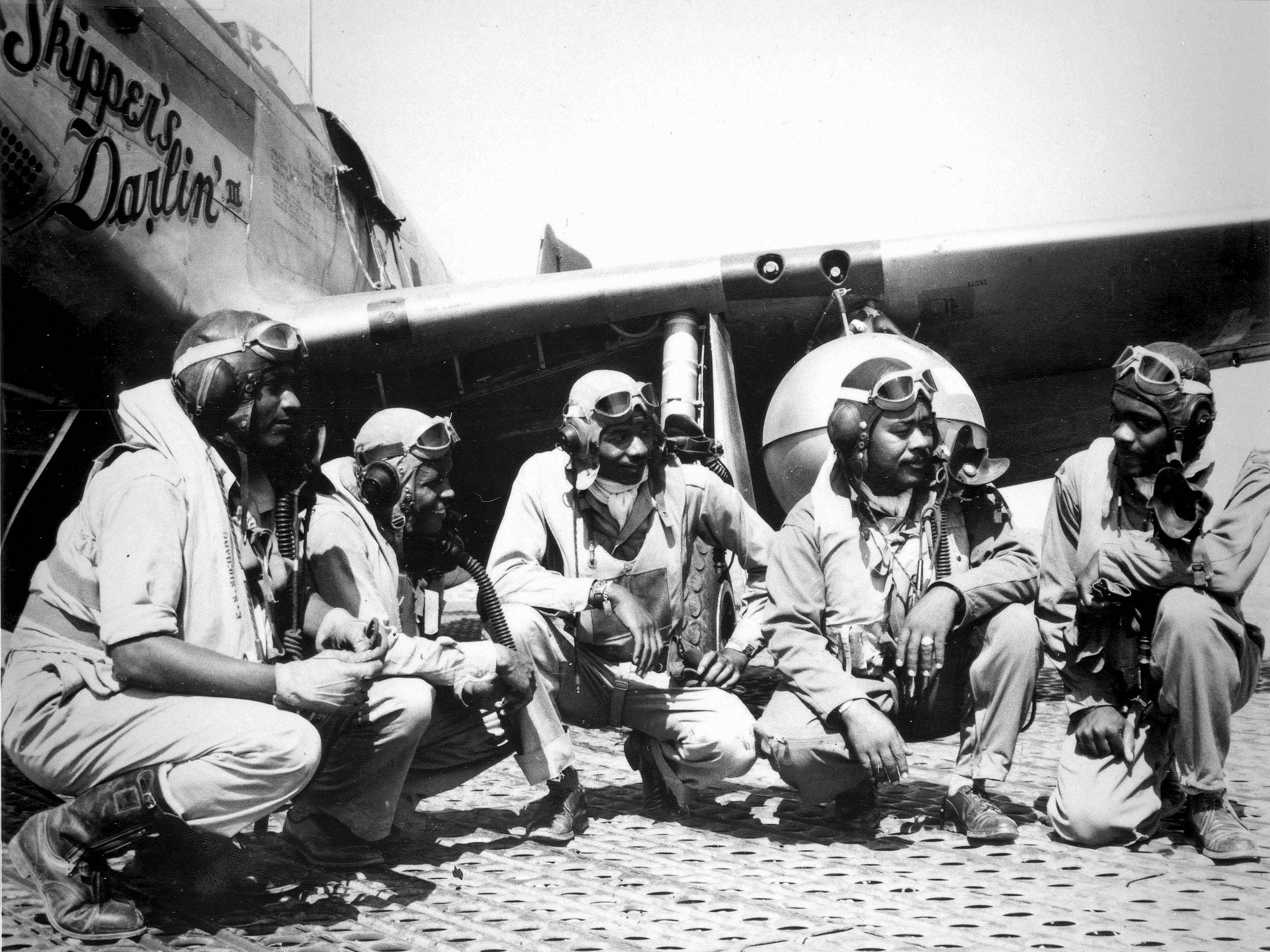
Pilots of the all-Black American 332nd Fighter Group (the Tuskegee Airmen) at Ramitelli, Italy: From left, Lt. Dempsey W. Morgran, Lt. Carroll S. Woods, Lt. Robert H. Nelron, Jr., Capt. Andrew D. Turner, and Lt. Clarence D. Lester

At the start of 1944, Major General James Doolittle, the new commander of the 8th Air Force, released most fighters from the requirement of flying in close formation with the bombers, allowing them free rein to attack the Luftwaffe wherever it could be found. The aim was to achieve air supremacy. Mustang groups were sent far ahead of the bombers in a "fighter sweep" to intercept German fighters. Bomber crews complained, but by June, supremacy was achieved.

The Luftwaffe's twin-engined Messerschmitt Bf 110 Zerstörer heavy fighters brought up to deal with the bombers proved to be easy prey for the Mustangs, and had to be quickly withdrawn from combat. The Focke-Wulf Fw 190A, already suffering from poor high-altitude performance, was outperformed by the Mustang at the B-17's altitude, and when laden with heavy bomber-hunting weapons and extra armor as a replacement for the more vulnerable twin-engined Zerstörer heavy fighters, these variants had poor maneuverability and suffered heavy losses. The Messerschmitt Bf 109 had comparable performance to the P-51 at high altitudes, but its lightweight airframe was even more affected by increases in armament.

The Luftwaffe answered with the Gefechtsverband ("battle formation"). This consisted of a Sturmgruppe of heavily armed and armored Fw 190As escorted by two Begleitgruppen of Bf 109s, whose task was to keep the Mustangs away from the Fw 190s as they attacked the bombers. This strategy proved to be problematic, as the large German formation took a long time to assemble and was difficult to maneuver. It was often intercepted by the P-51 "fighter sweeps" before it could attack the bombers. However, German attacks against bombers could be effective when they did occur; the bomber-destroyer Fw 190As swept in from astern and often pressed their attacks to within 90 m (100 yd).

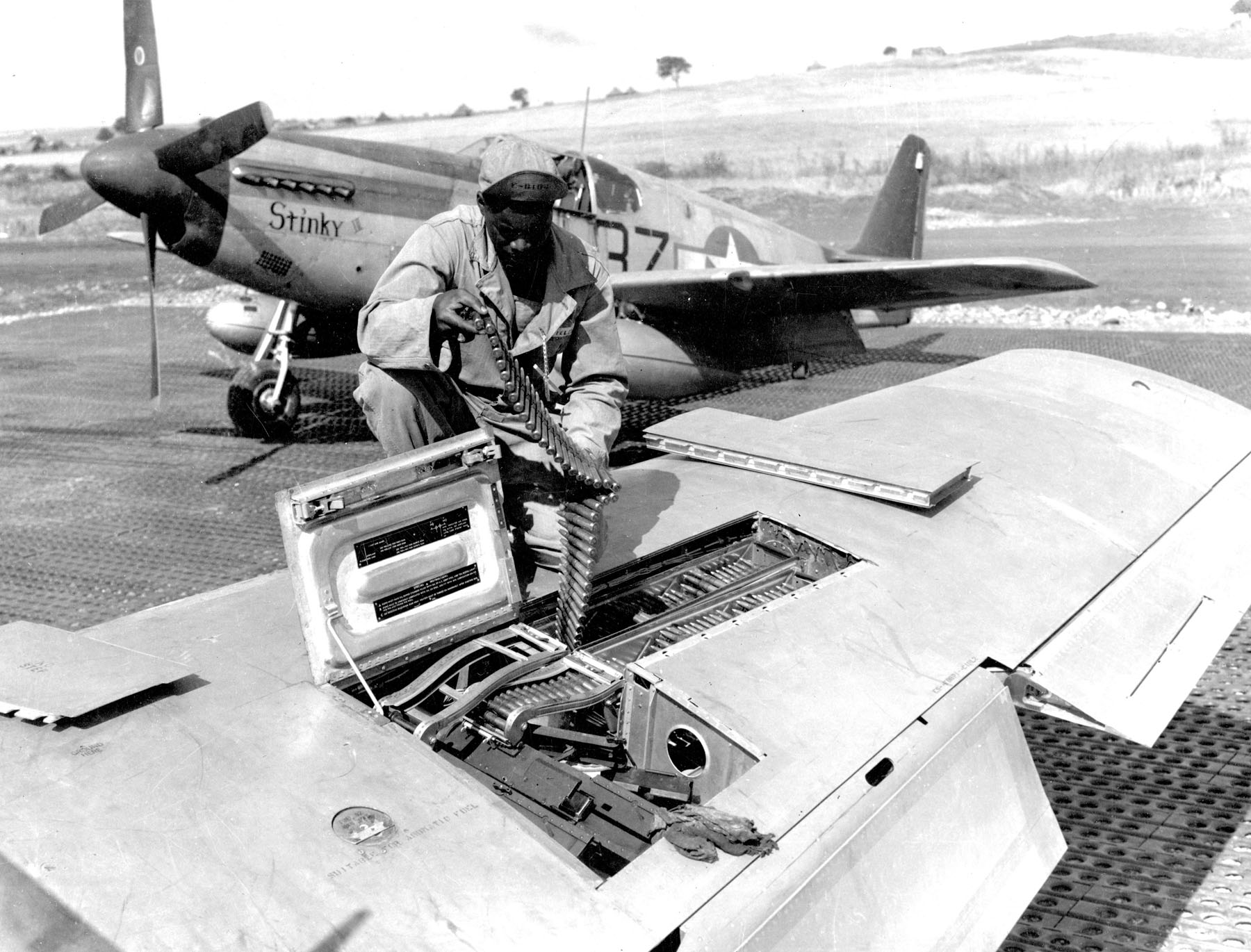
A USAAF armorer of the 100th Fighter Squadron, 332nd Fighter Group, 15th US Air Force checks ammunition belts of the .50 caliber (12.7 mm) Browning machine guns in the wings of a North American P-51B Mustang in Italy, circa September 1944

While not always able to avoid contact with the escorts, the threat of mass attacks and later the "company front" (eight abreast) assaults by armored Sturmgruppe Fw 190As brought an urgency to attacking the Luftwaffe wherever it could be found, either in the air or on the ground. Beginning in late February 1944, 8th Air Force fighter units began systematic strafing attacks on German airfields with increasing frequency and intensity, with the objective of gaining air supremacy over the Normandy battlefield. In general, these were conducted by units returning from escort missions, but beginning in March, many groups also were assigned airfield attacks instead of bomber support. The P-51, particularly with the advent of the K-14 gyro gunsight and the development of "Clobber Colleges" for the training of fighter pilots in late 1944, was a decisive element in Allied countermeasures against the Jagdverbände.

The numerical superiority of the USAAF fighters, superb flying characteristics of the P-51, and pilot proficiency helped cripple the Luftwaffe's fighter force. As a result, the fighter threat to the US, and later British, bombers was greatly diminished by July 1944. The RAF, long proponents of night bombing for protection, were able to reopen daylight bombing in 1944 as a result of the crippling of the Luftwaffe fighter arm. Reichsmarschall Hermann Göring, commander of the Luftwaffe during the war, was quoted as saying, "When I saw Mustangs over Berlin, I knew the jig was up."

==== Beyond Pointblank ====
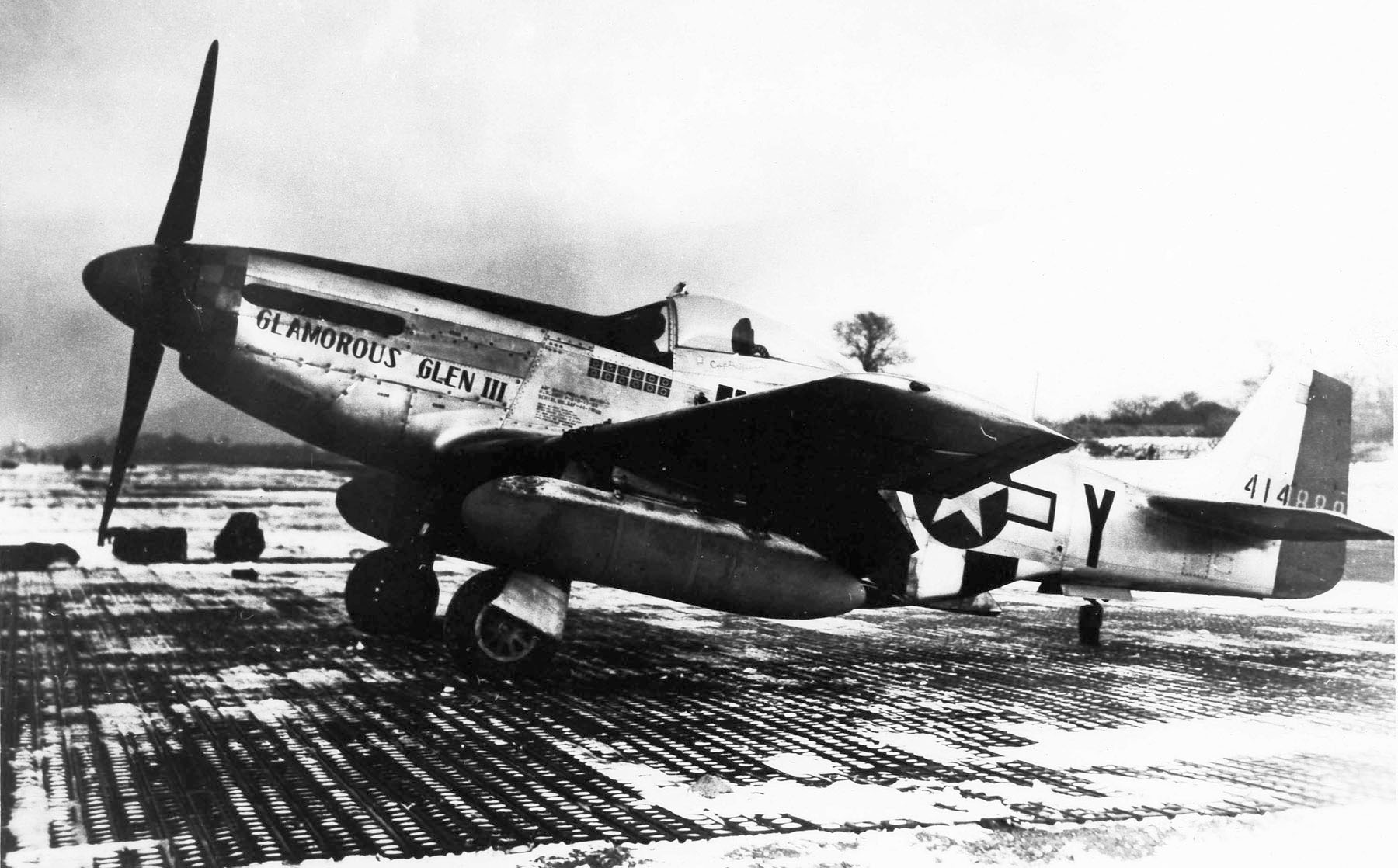
P-51D 44-14888 of the 8th AF/357th FG/363rd FS, named Glamorous Glen III, is the aircraft in which Chuck Yeager achieved most of his 12.5 kills, including two Me 262s – shown here with twin single-use 108-US-gallon (410 L) drop tanks fitted. This aircraft was renamed "Melody's Answer" and crashed on 2 March 1945, from unknown causes at Haseloff, west of Treuenbrietzen, Germany.

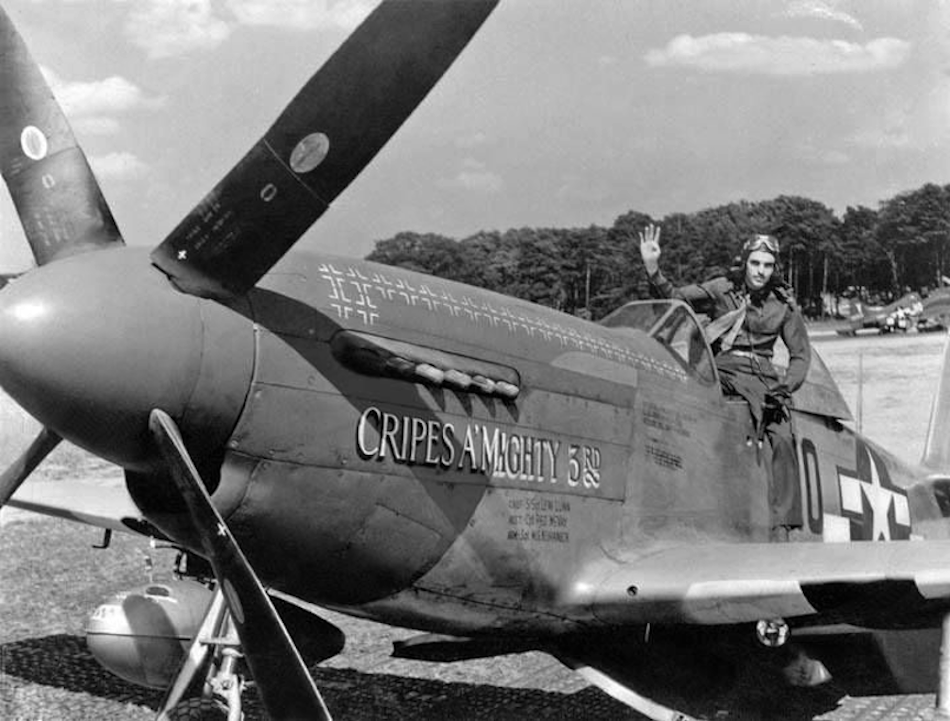
Top-scoring Mustang ace of WWII, Major George Earl Preddy Jr., with 26.83 aerial victories and five aircraft destroyed on the ground (first three victories were achieved on P-47)

On 15 April 1944, VIII Fighter Command began "Operation Jackpot", attacks on Luftwaffe fighter airfields. As the efficacy of these missions increased, the number of fighters at the German airbases fell to the point where they were no longer considered worthwhile targets. On 21 May, targets were expanded to include railways, locomotives, and other rolling stock used by the Germans to transport materiel and troops, in missions dubbed "Chattanooga". The P-51 excelled at this mission, although losses were much higher on strafing missions than in air-to-air combat, partially because the Mustang's Merlin engine, being liquid cooled, was vulnerable to radiator and coolant line damage from small-arms gunfire. On the other hand, the Mustang's stablemate, the Republic P-47 Thunderbolt, being powered by an air-cooled radial engine, could usually shrug off small-arms fire, and thus was regularly tasked with ground-strafing missions.

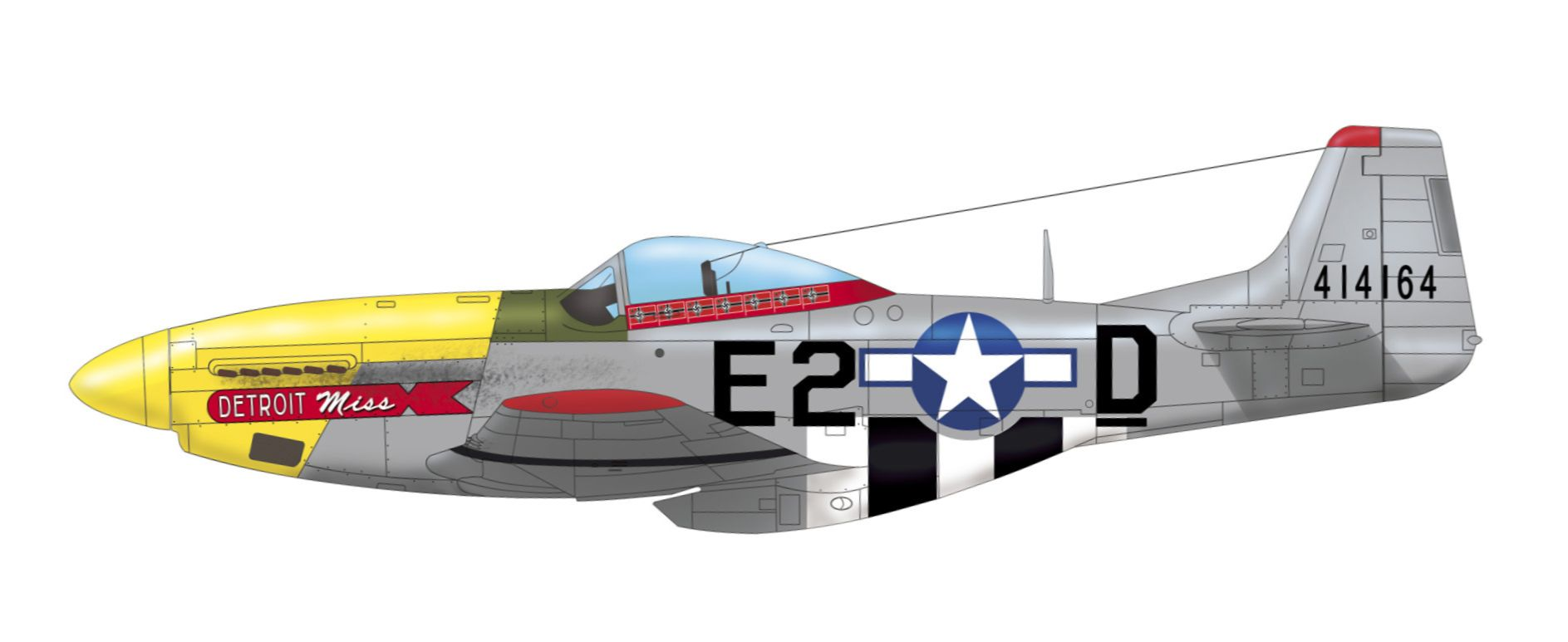
P-51D Mustang Detroit Miss of the 375th Fighter Squadron: Urban L. Drew flew this aircraft in late 1944 and shot down six German aircraft, including two jet-powered Me 262s in a single mission.

Given the overwhelming Allied air superiority, the Luftwaffe put its effort into the development of aircraft of such high performance that they could operate with impunity, but which also made bomber attack much more difficult, merely from the flight velocities they achieved. Foremost among these were the Messerschmitt Me 163B point-defense rocket interceptors, which started their operations with JG 400 near the end of July 1944, and the longer-endurance Messerschmitt Me 262A jet fighter, first flying with the Gruppe-strength Kommando Nowotny unit by the end of September 1944. In action, the Me 163 proved to be more dangerous to the Luftwaffe than to the Allies and was never a serious threat. The Me 262A was a serious threat, but attacks on their airfields neutralized them. The pioneering Junkers Jumo 004 axial-flow jet engines of the Me 262As needed careful nursing by their pilots, and these aircraft were particularly vulnerable during takeoff and landing. Lt. Chuck Yeager of the 357th Fighter Group was one of the first American pilots to shoot down an Me 262, which he caught during its landing approach. On 7 October 1944, Lt. Urban L. Drew of the 361st Fighter Group shot down two Me 262s that were taking off, while on the same day, Lt. Col. Hubert Zemke, who had transferred to the Mustang-equipped 479th Fighter Group, shot down what he thought was a Bf 109, only to have his gun camera film reveal that it may have been an Me 262. On 25 February 1945, Mustangs of the 55th Fighter Group surprised an entire Staffel of Me 262As at takeoff and destroyed six jets.

By 8 May 1945, the 8th, 9th, and 15th Air Force's P-51 groups (Note: All but three of these FGs flew P-38s, P-40s, or P-47s before converting to the Mustang.) claimed some 4,950 aircraft shot down (about half of all USAAF claims in the European theater, the most claimed by any Allied fighter in air-to-air combat) and 4,131 destroyed on the ground. Losses were about 2,520 aircraft.

In air combat, the top-scoring P-51 units (both of which exclusively flew Mustangs) were the 357th Fighter Group of the 8th Air Force with 565 air-to-air combat victories and the 9th Air Force's 354th Fighter Group with 664, which made it one of the top-scoring fighter groups. The top Mustang ace was the USAAF's George Preddy, whose final tally stood at 26.83 victories (a number that includes shared one half- and one third victory credits), 23 of which were scored with the P-51. Preddy was shot down and killed by friendly fire on Christmas Day 1944 during the Battle of the Bulge.

==== In China and the Pacific Theater ====
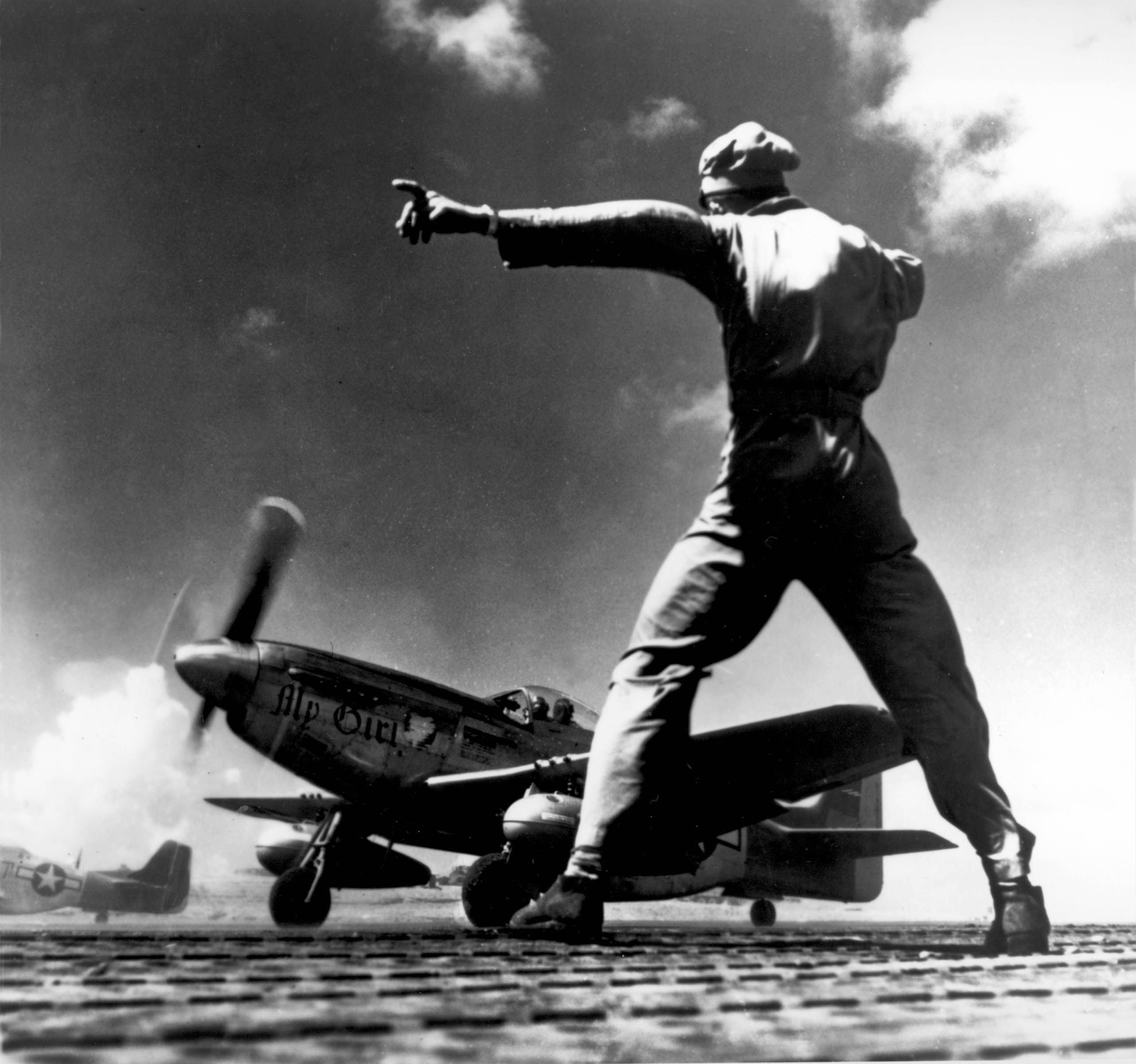
A P-51 Mustang taking off from Iwo Jima

In early 1945, P-51C, D, and K variants also joined the Chinese Nationalist Air Force. These Mustangs were provided to the 3rd, 4th, and 5th Fighter Groups and used to attack Japanese targets in occupied areas of China. The P-51 became the most capable fighter in China, while the Imperial Japanese Army Air Force used the Nakajima Ki-84 Hayate against it.

The P-51 was a relative latecomer to the Pacific theater, due largely to the need for the aircraft in Europe, plus the P-38 was already successful in the Pacific since its twin-engined design was considered a safety advantage for long, over-water flights. The first P-51s were deployed in the Far East later in 1944, operating in close-support and escort missions, as well as tactical photoreconnaissance. As the war in Europe wound down, the P-51 became more common in the Far East.

With the capture of Iwo Jima, USAAF P-51 Mustang fighters of the VII Fighter Command were stationed on that island starting in March 1945, being initially tasked with escorting Boeing B-29 Superfortress missions against the Japanese homeland. Iwo Jima's extreme humidity and blowing volcanic dust made aircraft maintenance challenging. To achieve the range required on very-long range missions, the P-51's engine was operated for very long periods at minimum power settings, leading to lead fouling of the spark plugs which had to be replaced after each mission. P-51s would fly round trips of 1,500 miles, mostly flown over water with minimal navigation equipment, and these escort missions would take seven or eight hours. While P-51s used 110-US-gallon (420 L) drop tanks over Europe, for Japan they frequently used 165-US-gallon (620 L) drop tanks which allowed more loitering time over Japan. While USAAF B-17 and B-24 bombers in Europe were arranged in combat box formations, over Japan the B-29s formed a stream that could stretch up to 200 miles. The escorting P-51s formed three Tar-Cap (Target Combat Air Patrol) squadrons, two squadrons flying on one side of the B-29 stream and the third on the other side, each squadron being 2,000 feet above and 4,000 to 5,000 feet laterally from the bomber stream.

Compared to its Japanese adversaries, the P-51 largely outclassed the Imperial Japanese Army Air Service's aging A6M Zero (the most numerous Japanese fighter available), as the A6M's poor high-altitude performance put it at a disadvantage in the P-51's favorable performance envelope. When the P-51 was used for interdiction or strike missions, the A6M was slower but could still out-turn or out climb the P-51 at low to medium altitude. Newer Japanese designs were potent but too few in number. The Kawanishi N1K-J Shiden was fast and agile, but not effective as an interceptor due to a poor rate of climb and reduced engine performance at high altitude. The Imperial Japanese Army Air Service's Nakajima Ki-84 Hayate had performance and an operation ceiling that could match the P-51, however the Ki-84 suffered from manufacturing defects, and its high-maintenance Nakajima Homare engine could not reach its full potential due to lack of ample high-octane fuel.

In actual practice, the P-51 escorts proved both impractical and unnecessary, and only ten such missions were flown from Iwo Jima. The actual threat to American bombers from Japanese interceptor fighters continued to diminish, as all that remained in the Japanese inventory were mostly obsolescent types, exacerbated by numerous quality control issues and fuel shortages as well as insufficient pilot training, and soon the Japanese were saving their remaining planes and fuel for kamikazes. By the time Iwo Jima had been captured, the bombing campaign against Japan had switched from daylight precision bombing to nighttime incendiary attacks, so fighter escorts were of limited utility.

The command's last major raid of May was a daylight incendiary attack on Yokohama on 29 May conducted by 517 B-29s escorted by 101 P-51s. This force was intercepted by 150 A6M Zero fighters, sparking an intense air battle in which five B-29s were shot down and another 175 damaged. In return, the P-51 pilots claimed 26 "kills" and 23 "probables" for the loss of three fighters. The 454 B-29s that reached Yokohama struck the city's main business district and destroyed 6.9 square miles (18 km^{2}) of buildings; over 1000 Japanese were killed. Overall, the attacks in May destroyed 94 square miles (240 km^{2}) of buildings, which was equivalent to one-seventh of Japan's total urban area. The minister of home affairs, Iwao Yamazaki, concluded after these raids that Japan's civil defense arrangements were "considered to be futile". On the first day of June, which would be known as "Black Friday", 521 B-29s escorted by 148 P-51s were dispatched in a daylight raid against Osaka. While en route to the city, the Mustangs flew through thick clouds, and 27 of the fighters were destroyed in collisions. Nevertheless, 458 heavy bombers and 27 P-51s reached the city, and the bombardment killed 3,960 Japanese and destroyed 3.15 square miles (8.2 km^{2}) of buildings. On 5 June 473 B-29s struck Kobe by day and destroyed 4.35 square miles (11.3 km^{2}) of buildings for the loss of 11 bombers. A force of 409 B-29s attacked Osaka again on 7 June; during this attack, 2.21 square miles (5.7 km^{2}) of buildings were burnt out and the Americans did not suffer any losses. Osaka was bombed for the fourth time that month, on 15 June, when 444 B-29s destroyed 1.9 square miles (4.9 km^{2}) of the city and another 0.59 square miles (1.5 km^{2}) of nearby Amagasaki; 300,000 houses were destroyed in Osaka. This attack marked the end of the first phase of XXI Bomber Command's attack on Japan's cities. During May and June, the bombers had destroyed much of the country's six largest cities, killing between 112,000 and 126,762 people and rendering millions homeless. The widespread destruction and high number of casualties from these raids caused many Japanese to realize that their country's military was no longer able to defend the home islands. American losses were low compared to Japanese casualties; 136 B-29s were downed during the campaign. In Tokyo, Osaka, Nagoya, Yokohama, Kobe, and Kawasaki, "over 126,762 people were killed ... and a million and a half dwellings and over 105 square miles (270 km^{2}) of urban space were destroyed." In Tokyo, Osaka and Nagoya, "the areas leveled (almost 100 square miles (260 km^{2})) exceeded the areas destroyed in all German cities by both the American and British air forces (about 79 square miles (200 km^{2}))."

P-51s also conducted a series of independent ground-attack missions against targets in the home islands. The first of these operations took place on 16 April, when 57 P-51s strafed Kanoya Air Field in Kyushu. In operations conducted between 26 April and 22 June, the American fighter pilots claimed the destruction of 64 Japanese aircraft and damage to another 180 on the ground, as well as a further 10 shot down in flight; these claims were lower than the American planners had expected, however, and the raids were considered unsuccessful. USAAF losses were 11 P-51s to enemy action and seven to other causes.

Due to the lack of Japanese air opposition to the American bomber raids, VII Fighter Command was solely tasked with ground-attack missions from July. These raids were frequently made against airfields to destroy aircraft being held in reserve to attack the expected Allied invasion fleet. While the P-51 pilots only occasionally encountered Japanese fighters in the air, the airfields were protected by antiaircraft batteries and barrage balloons. By the end of the war, VII Fighter Command had conducted 51 ground-attack raids, of which 41 were considered successful. The fighter pilots claimed to have destroyed or damaged 1,062 aircraft and 254 ships, along with large numbers of buildings and railway rolling stock. American losses were 91 pilots killed and 157 Mustangs destroyed.

Overall, P-51 pilots on Iwo Jima flew 51 missions (4,172 sorties) over Japan during their VLR campaign of 1945, including both bomber escort and independent ground-attack missions, encountering enemy aircraft on 33 occasions.

==== Medal of Honor recipients ====
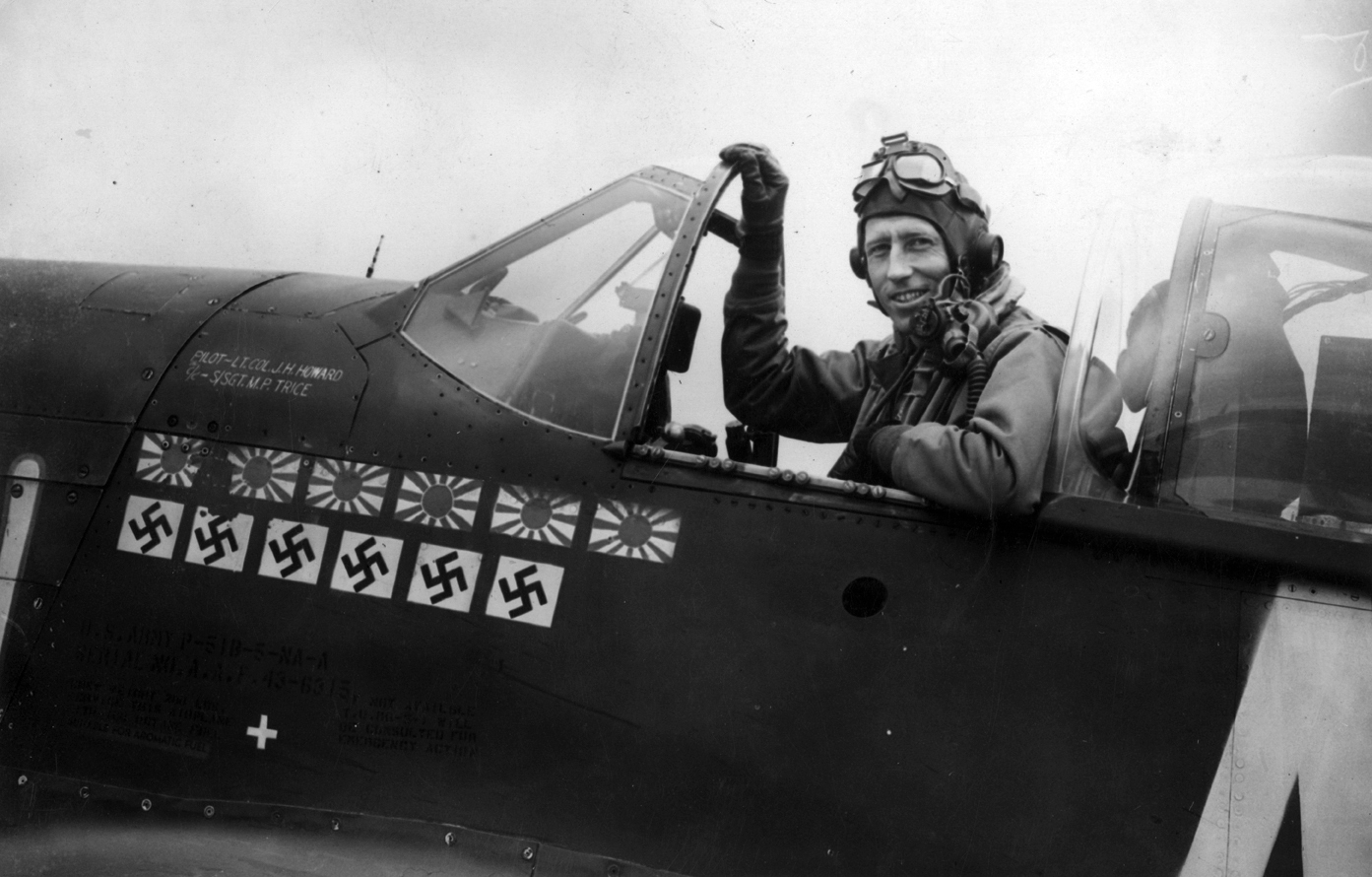
Medal of Honor recipient Lt. Col. James H. Howard, in the cockpit of his P-51 Mustang

Two P-51 pilots received the Medal of Honor during World War II:

- USAAF Lt Col. James H. Howard of the 356th Fighter Squadron, 354th Fighter Group was awarded the Medal of Honor for his action during a bomber escort mission near Oschersleben, Germany on 11 January 1944, flying P-51B, serial number 43-6315 nicknamed "Ding Hao". Despite being outnumbered, Howard shot down three German planes and continued to defend the bombers even when his guns went out of action and fuel supply became dangerously low.
- USAAF Maj. William A. Shomo of the 82nd Reconnaissance Squadron, 71st Reconnaissance Group was awarded the Medal of Honor for his action during a mission over Luzon, Philippines on 11 January 1945, flying an F-6D, the armed photo reconnaissance variant of the P-51, serial number 44-14841 nicknamed "Snooks the 5th". On that mission, Shomo shot down seven Japanese planes and became an "ace in a day".

=== Pilot observations ===
Chief Naval Test Pilot and C.O. Captured Enemy Aircraft Flight Capt. Eric Brown, RN, tested the Mustang at RAE Farnborough in March 1944 and noted:

The Mustang was a good fighter and the best escort due to its incredible range, make no mistake about it. It was also the best American dogfighter. But the laminar-flow wing fitted to the Mustang could be a little tricky. It could not by any means out-turn a Spitfire. No way. It had a good rate-of-roll, better than the Spitfire, so I would say the plusses to the Spitfire and the Mustang just about equate. If I were in a dogfight, I'd prefer to be flying the Spitfire. The problem was I wouldn't like to be in a dogfight near Berlin, because I could never get home to Britain in a Spitfire!

The US Air Forces, Flight Test Engineering, assessed the Mustang B on 24 April 1944 thus:

The rate of climb is good and the high speed in level flight is exceptionally good at all altitudes, from sea level to 40,000 feet. The airplane is very maneuverable with good controllability at indicated speeds up to 400 MPH [sic]. The stability about all axes is good and the rate of roll is excellent; however, the radius of turn is fairly large for a fighter. The cockpit layout is excellent, but visibility is poor on the ground and only fair in level flight.

Kurt Bühligen, the third-highest scoring German fighter pilot of World War II's Western Front (with 112 confirmed victories, three against Mustangs), later stated:

We would out-turn the P-51 and the other American fighters, with the Bf 109 or the Fw 190. Their turn rate was about the same. The P-51 was faster than us, but our munitions and cannon were better.

German fighter ace Heinz Bär said that the P-51:

was perhaps the most difficult of all Allied aircraft to meet in combat. It was fast, maneuverable, hard to see, and difficult to identify because it resembled the Me 109.

=== After World War II ===
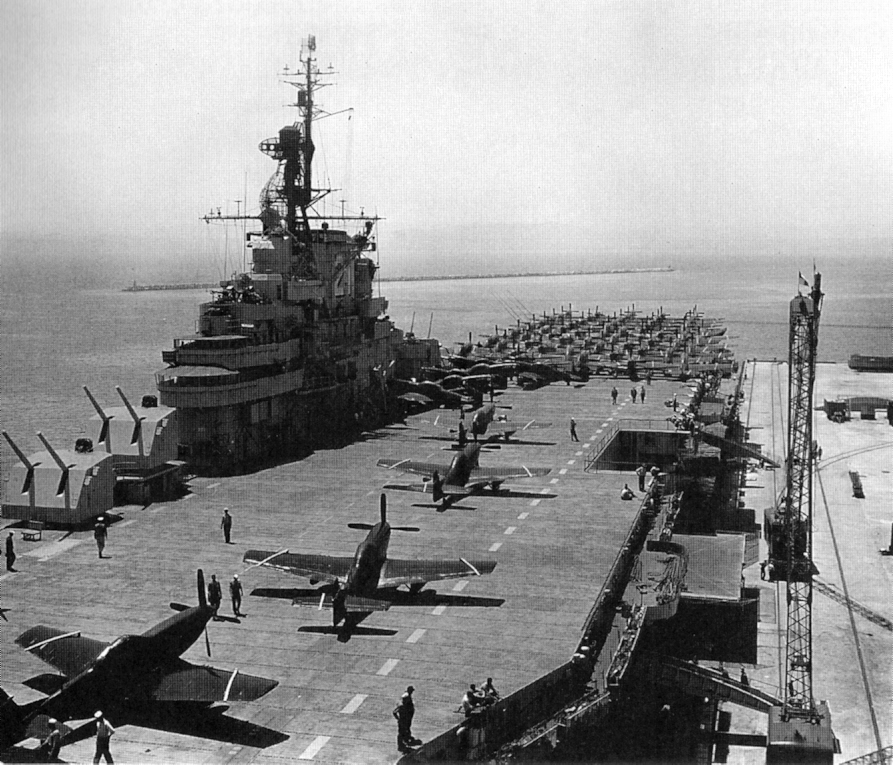
USS Boxer loads 146 USAF F-51Ds at Alameda for the Korean theater, in July 1950.

In the aftermath of World War II, the USAAF consolidated much of its wartime combat force and selected the P-51 as a "standard" piston-engined fighter, while other types, such as the P-38 and P-47, were withdrawn or given substantially reduced roles. As the more advanced (P-80 and P-84) jet fighters were introduced, the P-51 was also relegated to secondary duties.

In 1947, the newly formed USAF Strategic Air Command employed fighter Mustangs alongside F-6 Mustangs and F-82 Twin Mustangs, due to their range capabilities. In 1948 a new designation scheme for USAF aircraft was introduced, with the prefix "P-" for "pursuit" changed to "F-" for "fighter" and the existing "F-" designation for photographic reconnaissance replaced with "RF-;" Mustang variants still in service in the USAF or Air National Guard (ANG) when the system was changed included: F-51B, F-51D, F-51K, RF-51D (formerly F-6D), RF-51K (formerly F-6K) and TRF-51D (two-seat trainer conversions of F-6Ds). By 1950, the majority of the USAF's Mustangs had become surplus to requirements and had been placed in storage or transferred to the Air Force Reserve and the ANG.

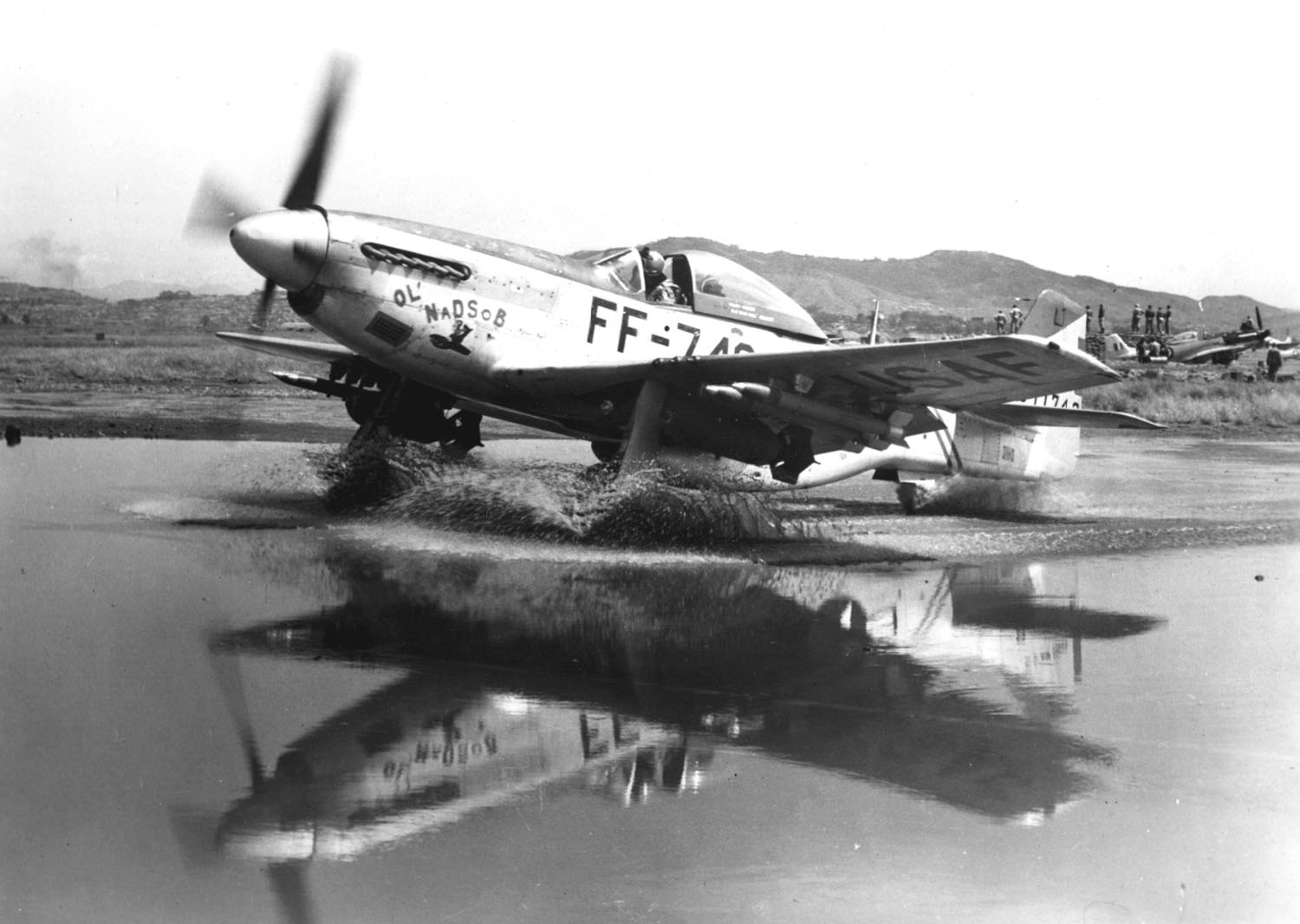
An F-51 Mustang, laden with bombs and rockets, taxis through a puddle at an airbase in Korea.

From the start of the Korean War, the Mustang once again proved useful. A "substantial number" of stored or in-service F-51Ds were shipped, via aircraft carriers, to the combat zone, and were used by the USAF, the South African Air Force, and the Republic of Korea Air Force (ROKAF). The F-51 was used for ground attack, fitted with rockets and bombs, and photo reconnaissance, rather than being as interceptors or "pure" fighters, where it was already surpassed by early jets. After the first North Korean invasion, USAF units were forced to fly from bases in Japan and the F-51Ds, with their long range and endurance, could attack targets in Korea that short-ranged F-80 jets could not. Because of the vulnerable liquid cooling system, however, the F-51s sustained heavy losses to ground fire. On 5 August 1950, Major Louis J. Sebille of the 67th Fighter-Bomber Squadron attacked a North Korean armored column advancing on United Nations military units during the Battle of Pusan Perimeter. Though his aircraft was heavily damaged and he was wounded during the first pass on the column, he turned his F-51 around and deliberately crashed into the convoy at the cost of his life, and was posthumously awarded the Medal of Honor.

Mustangs continued flying with USAF and ROKAF fighter-bomber units on close support and interdiction missions in Korea until 1953 when they were largely replaced as fighter-bombers by USAF F-84s and by United States Navy (USN) Grumman F9F Panthers. Other air forces and units using the Mustang included the Royal Australian Air Force's 77 Squadron, which flew Australian-built Mustangs as part of British Commonwealth Forces Korea. The Mustangs were replaced by Gloster Meteor F8s in 1951.

F-51s flew in the Air Force Reserve and ANG throughout the 1950s; the very last Mustang in this role was F-51D-30-NA AF serial no. 44-74936, which was finally withdrawn from the West Virginia Air National Guard's 167th Fighter Interceptor Squadron in January 1957 and retired to what was then called the Air Force Central Museum, although it was briefly reactivated to fly at the 50th anniversary of the Air Force Aerial Firepower Demonstration at the Air Proving Ground, Eglin AFB, Florida, on 6 May 1957. This aircraft, painted as P-51D-15-NA serial no. 44-15174, is on display at the National Museum of the United States Air Force, Wright-Patterson AFB, in Dayton, Ohio.

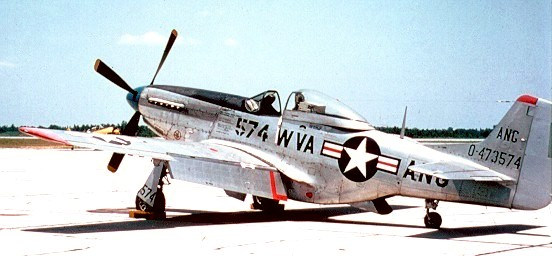
West Virginia Air National Guard F-51D with postwar "uncuffed" propeller unit

The final withdrawal of the Mustang from USAF placed hundreds of P-51s onto the civilian market. The rights to the Mustang design were purchased from North American by the Cavalier Aircraft Corporation, which attempted to market the surplus Mustang aircraft in the US and overseas. In 1967 and again in 1972, the USAF procured batches of remanufactured Mustangs from Cavalier, most of them destined for air forces in South America and Asia that were participating in the Military Assistance Program (MAP). These aircraft were remanufactured from existing original F-51D airframes fitted with new V-1650-7 engines, a new radio, tall F-51H-type vertical tails, and a stronger wing that could carry six 12.7 mm (0.50 in) machine guns and a total of eight underwing hardpoints. Two 1,000-pound (450 kg) bombs and six 127 mm (5 in) rockets could be carried. They all had an original F-51D-type canopy but carried a second seat for an observer behind the pilot. One additional Mustang was a two-seat, dual-control TF-51D (67-14866) with an enlarged canopy and only four wing guns. Although these remanufactured Mustangs were intended for sale to South American and Asian nations through the MAP, they were delivered to the USAF with full USAF markings. They were, however, allocated new serial numbers (67-14862/14866, 67-22579/22582 and 72-1526/1541).

The last US military use of the F-51 was in 1968 when the US Army employed a vintage F-51D (44-72990) as a chase aircraft for the Lockheed YAH-56 Cheyenne armed helicopter project. This aircraft was so successful in this mission that the Army ordered two F-51Ds from Cavalier in 1968 for use at Fort Rucker. They were assigned the serials 68-15795 and 68-15796. These F-51s had wingtip fuel tanks and were unarmed. Following the end of the Cheyenne program, these two chase aircraft were used for other projects. One of them (68-15795) was fitted with a 106 mm recoilless rifle for evaluation of the weapon's value in attacking fortified ground targets. Cavalier Mustang 68-15796 survives at the Air Force Armament Museum, Eglin AFB, Florida, displayed indoors in World War II markings.

The F-51 was adopted by many foreign air forces and continued to be an effective fighter into the mid-1980s with smaller air arms. The last Mustang ever downed in battle occurred during Operation Power Pack in the Dominican Republic in 1965, with the last aircraft finally being retired by the Dominican Air Force in 1984.

=== Service with other air forces ===
After World War II, the P-51 Mustang served in the air arms of more than 25 nations. During the war, a Mustang cost about $51,000, while many hundreds were sold postwar for the nominal price of one dollar to signatories of the Inter-American Treaty of Reciprocal Assistance, ratified in Rio de Janeiro in 1947.

These countries used the P-51 Mustang:

Australia

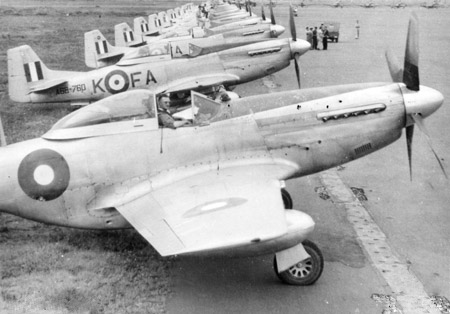
P-51Ds of 82 Squadron RAAF in Bofu, Japan, as part of the British Commonwealth Occupation Force, in 1947

In November 1944, 3 Squadron RAAF became the first Royal Australian Air Force unit to use Mustangs. At the time of its conversion from the P-40 to the Mustang, the squadron was based in Italy with the RAF's Desert Air Force.
3 Squadron was renumbered 4 Squadron after returning to Australia from Italy, and converted to P-51Ds. Several other Australian or Pacific-based squadrons converted to either CAC-built Mustangs or to imported P-51Ks from July 1945, having been equipped with P-40s or Boomerangs for wartime service; these units were: 76, 77, 82, 83, 84 and 86 squadrons. Only 17 Mustangs reached the RAAF's First Tactical Air Force front-line squadrons by the time World War II ended in August 1945.

76, 77 and 82 squadrons were formed into 81 Fighter Wing of the British Commonwealth Air Force, which was part of the British Commonwealth Occupation Force stationed in Japan from February 1946. 77 Squadron used its P-51s extensively during the first months of the Korean War, before converting to Gloster Meteor jets.

Five reserve units from the Citizen Air Force also operated Mustangs. 21 "City of Melbourne" Squadron, based in the state of Victoria; 22 "City of Sydney" Squadron, based in New South Wales; 23 "City of Brisbane" Squadron, based in Queensland; 24 "City of Adelaide" Squadron, based in South Australia; and 25 "City of Perth" Squadron, based in Western Australia; all of these units were equipped with CAC Mustangs, rather than P-51D or Ks. The last Mustangs were retired from these units in 1960 when CAF units adopted a nonflying role.

Bolivia

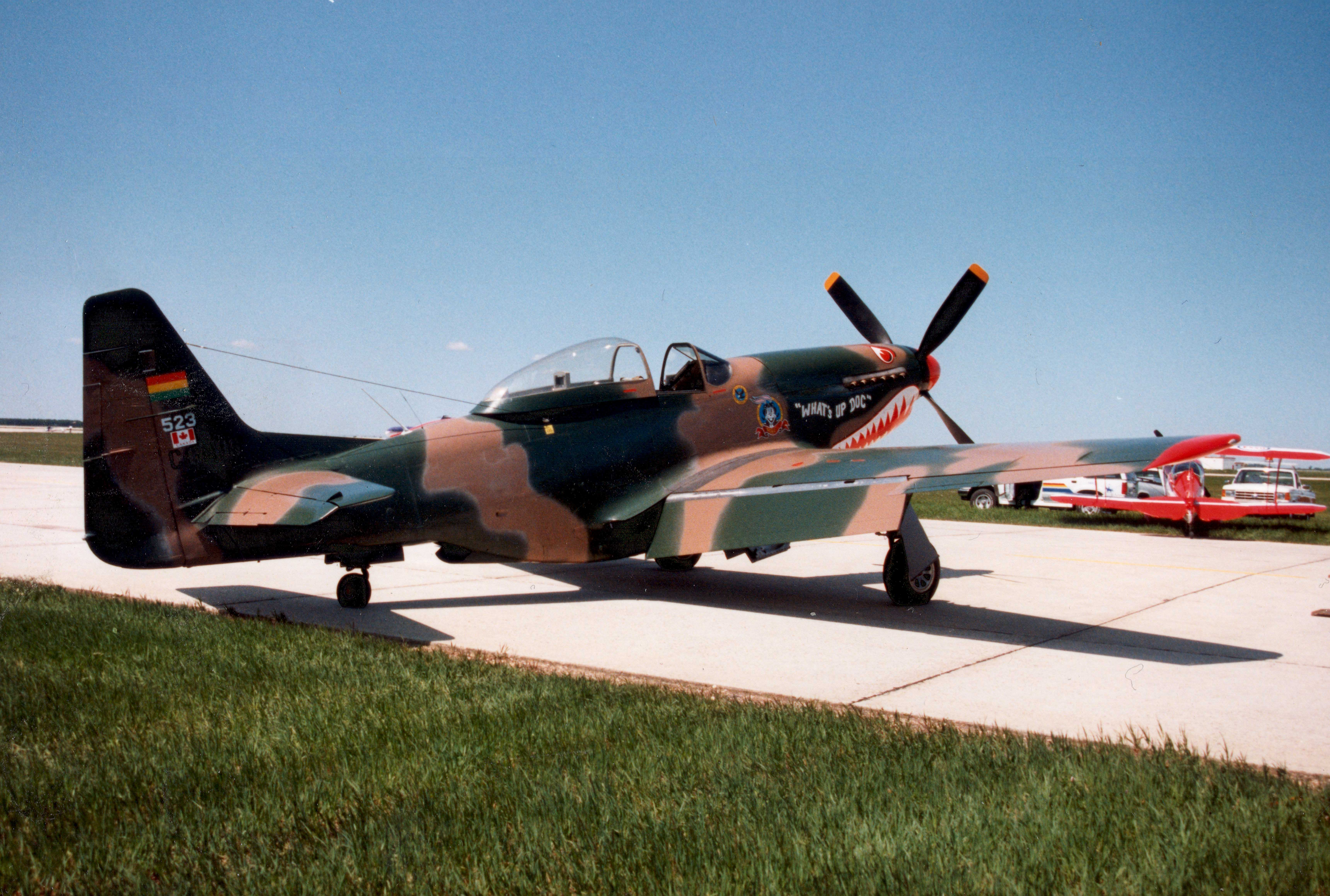
A Cavalier Mustang, formerly of the Bolivian Air Force, parked on a Canadian airfield

Nine Cavalier F-51D (including the two TF-51s) were given to Bolivia, under a program called Peace Condor.

Canada

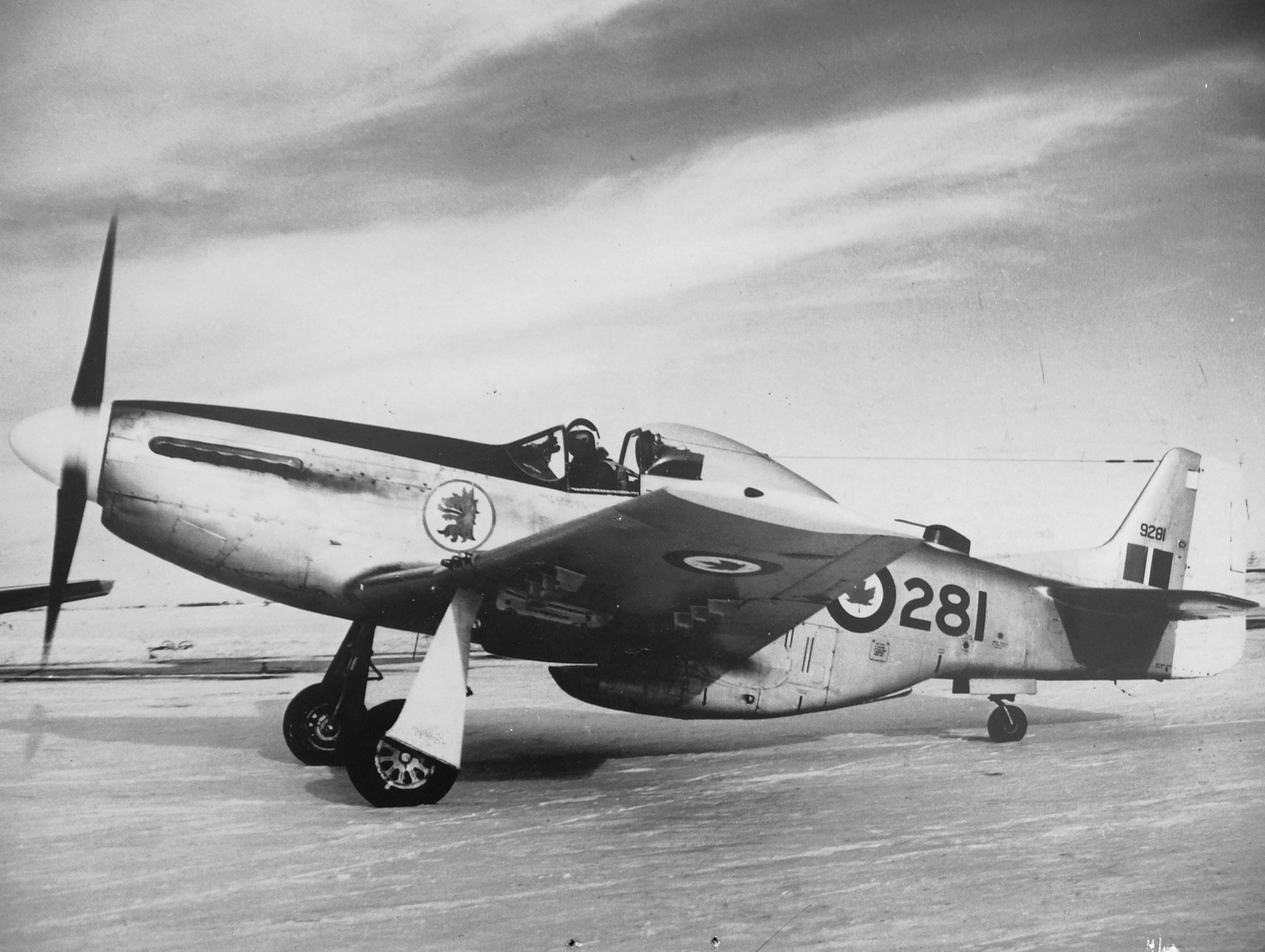
Lynn Garrison with RCAF 9281, 1956, subsequently flown during the 1969 Football War, returned to the US by Jerry Janes and flown as Cottonmouth

Canada had five squadrons equipped with Mustangs during World War II. RCAF 400, 414, and 430 squadrons flew Mustang Mk Is (1942–1944) and 441 and 442 squadrons flew Mustang Mk IIIs and IVAs in 1945. Postwar, a total of 150 Mustang P-51Ds were purchased and served in two regular (416 "Lynx" and 417 "City of Windsor") and six auxiliary fighter squadrons (402 "City of Winnipeg", 403 "City of Calgary", 420 "City of London", 424 "City of Hamilton", 442 "City of Vancouver" and 443 "City of New Westminster"). The Mustangs were declared obsolete in 1956, but special-duty versions served on into the early 1960s.

Republic of China

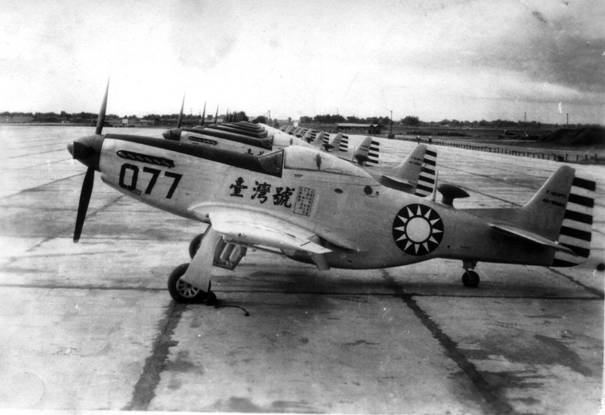
P-51 of the Republic of China Air Force, 1953

The Chinese Nationalist Air Force obtained the P-51 during the late Sino-Japanese War to fight against the Japanese. After the war, Chiang Kai-shek's Nationalist government used the planes against insurgent Communist forces. The Nationalists retreated to Taiwan in 1949. Pilots supporting Chiang brought most of the Mustangs with them, where the aircraft became part of the island's defense arsenal.

People's Republic of China

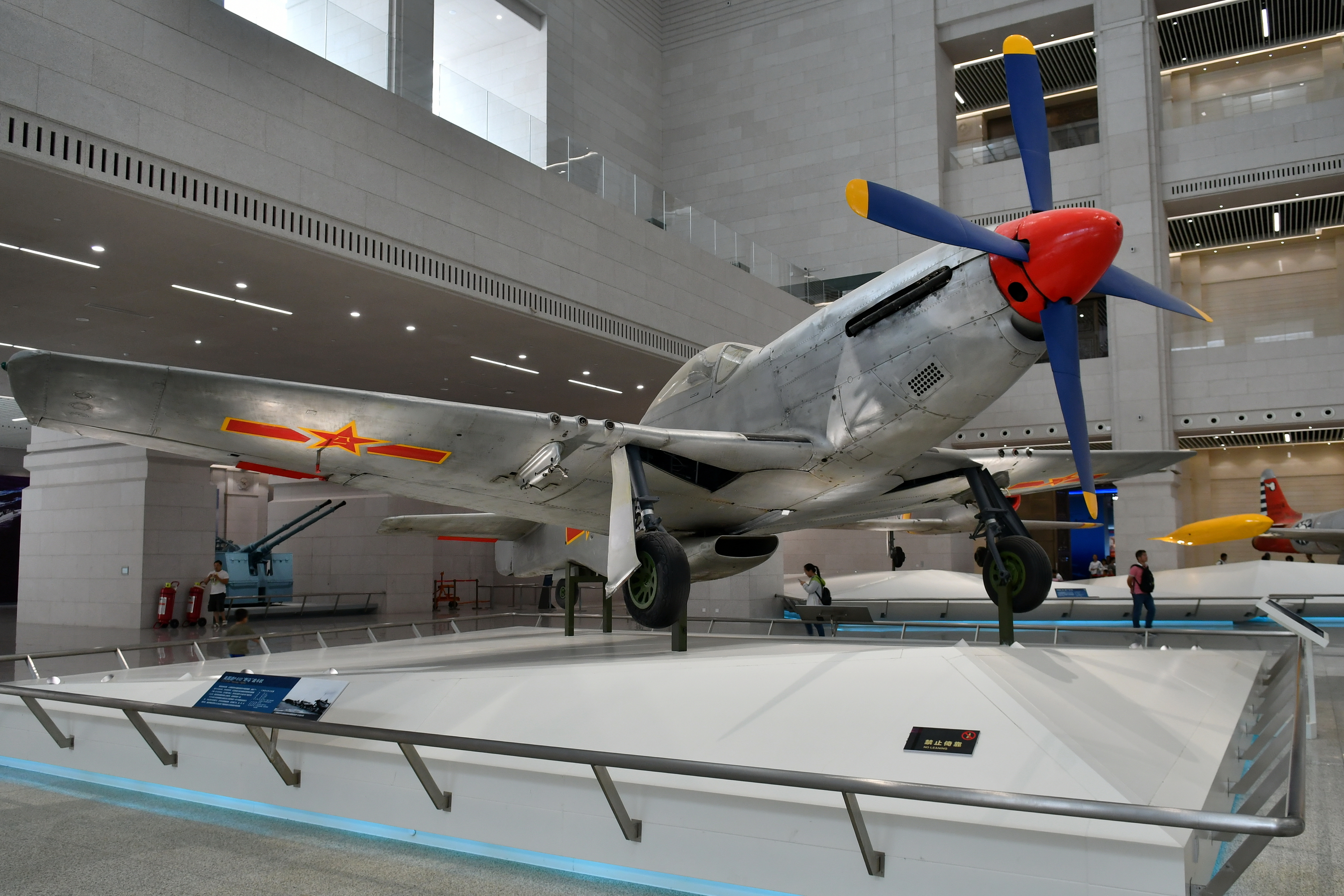
P-51D Mustang in Military Museum of the Chinese People's Revolution

The Communist Chinese captured 39 P-51s from the Nationalists while they were retreating to Taiwan. In August 1949, the People's Liberation Army Air Force formed its first P-51 squadron at Beijing Nanyuan Airport and were tasked of the defending Beijing's airspace from Nationalist Air Force aircraft. On 1 October 1949, when Mao Zedong proclaimed the founding of the People's Republic of China, nine P-51s conducted a fly-past during the military parade in Beijing. By 1950, when Soviet Union began supplying modern military equipment to China, surviving P-51s were relegated to PLAAF's aviation school and 13 P-51s were modified as two-seat trainers. By September 1953, most P-51s were retired from service and only eight P-51s remained in service to teach Ilyushin Il-10 pilots on how to taxi aircraft.

Costa Rica
The Costa Rican Air Force flew four P-51Ds from 1955 to 1964.

Cuba
In November 1958, three US-registered civilian P-51D Mustangs were illegally flown separately from Miami to Cuba, on delivery to the rebel forces of the 26th of July Movement, then headed by Fidel Castro during the Cuban Revolution. One of the Mustangs was damaged during delivery and none of them were used operationally. After the success of the revolution in January 1959, with other rebel aircraft plus those of the existing Cuban government forces, they were adopted into the Fuerza Aérea Revolucionaria. Due to increasing US restrictions and lack of spares and maintenance experience, they never achieved operational status. At the time of the Bay of Pigs invasion, the two intact Mustangs were already effectively grounded at Campo Columbia and at Santiago. After the failed invasion, they were placed on display with other symbols of "revolutionary struggle" and one remains on display at the Museo del Aire.

Dominican Republic
The Dominican Republic was the largest Latin American air force to employ the P-51D, with six aircraft acquired in 1948, 44 ex-Swedish F-51Ds purchased in 1948, and a further Mustang obtained from an unknown source. It was the last nation to have any Mustangs in service, with some remaining in use as late as 1984. Nine of the final 10 aircraft were sold back to American collectors in 1988.

El Salvador
The Salvadoran Air Force (Fuerza Aérea Salvadoreña or FAS) purchased five Cavalier Mustang IIs (and one dual-control Cavalier TF-51) that featured wingtip fuel tanks to increase combat range and up-rated Merlin engines. Seven P-51D Mustangs were also in service. They were used during the 1969 Football War against Honduras, the last time the P-51 was used in combat. One of them, FAS-404, was shot down by a Vought F4U-5 Corsair flown by Captain Fernando Soto in the last aerial combat between piston-engined fighters in the world.

France
In late 1944, the first French unit began its transition to reconnaissance Mustangs. In January 1945, the Tactical Reconnaissance Squadron 2/33 of the French Air Force took their F-6Cs and F-6Ds over Germany on photographic mapping missions. The Mustangs remained in service until the early 1950s, when they were replaced by jet fighters.

Germany
Several P-51s were captured by the Luftwaffe as Beuteflugzeug ("captured aircraft") following crash landings. These aircraft were subsequently repaired and test-flown by the Zirkus Rosarius, or Rosarius Staffel, the official Erprobungskommando of the Luftwaffe High Command, for combat evaluation at Göttingen. The aircraft were repainted with German markings and bright yellow noses, tails, and bellies for identification. P-51B/P-51Cs – including examples marked with Luftwaffe Geschwaderkennung codes T9+CK, T9+FK, T9+HK, and T9+PK (with the "T9" prefix not known to be officially assigned to any existing Luftwaffe formation from their own records, outside of the photos of Zirkus Rosarius–flown aircraft)—with a total of three captured P-51Ds were also flown by the unit. Some of these P-51s were found by Allied forces at the end of the war; others crashed during testing. The Mustang is also listed in the appendix to the novel KG 200 as having been flown by the German secret operations unit KG 200, which tested, evaluated, and sometimes clandestinely operated captured enemy aircraft during World War II.

Guatemala

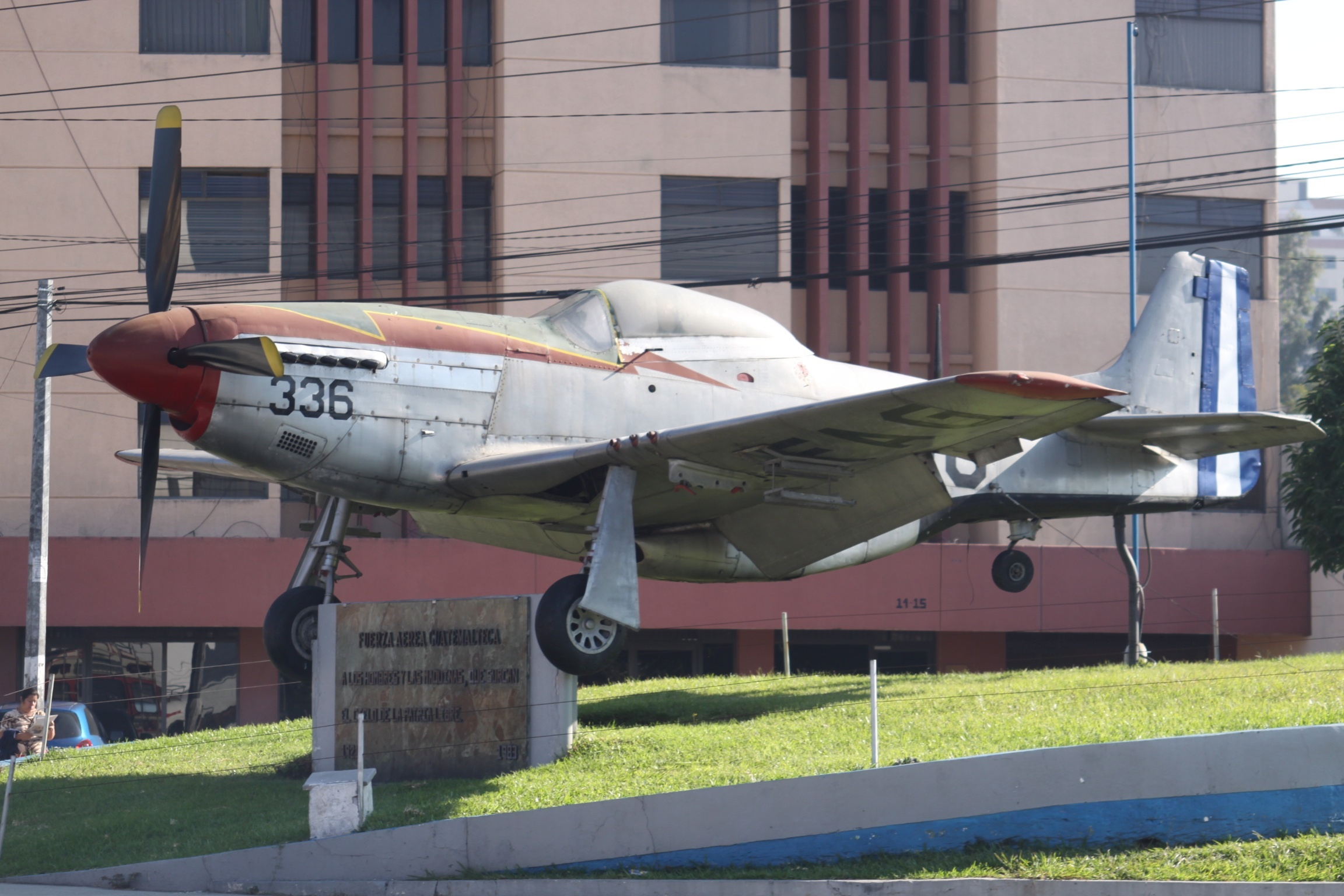
Guatemalan Air Force P-51Ds at Guatemala La Aurora International

The Guatemalan Air Force had 30 P-51D Mustangs in service from 1954 to the early 1970s.

Haiti
Haiti had four P-51D Mustangs when President Paul Eugène Magloire was in power from 1950 to 1956, with the last retired in 1973–1974 and sold for spares to the Dominican Republic.

Indonesia

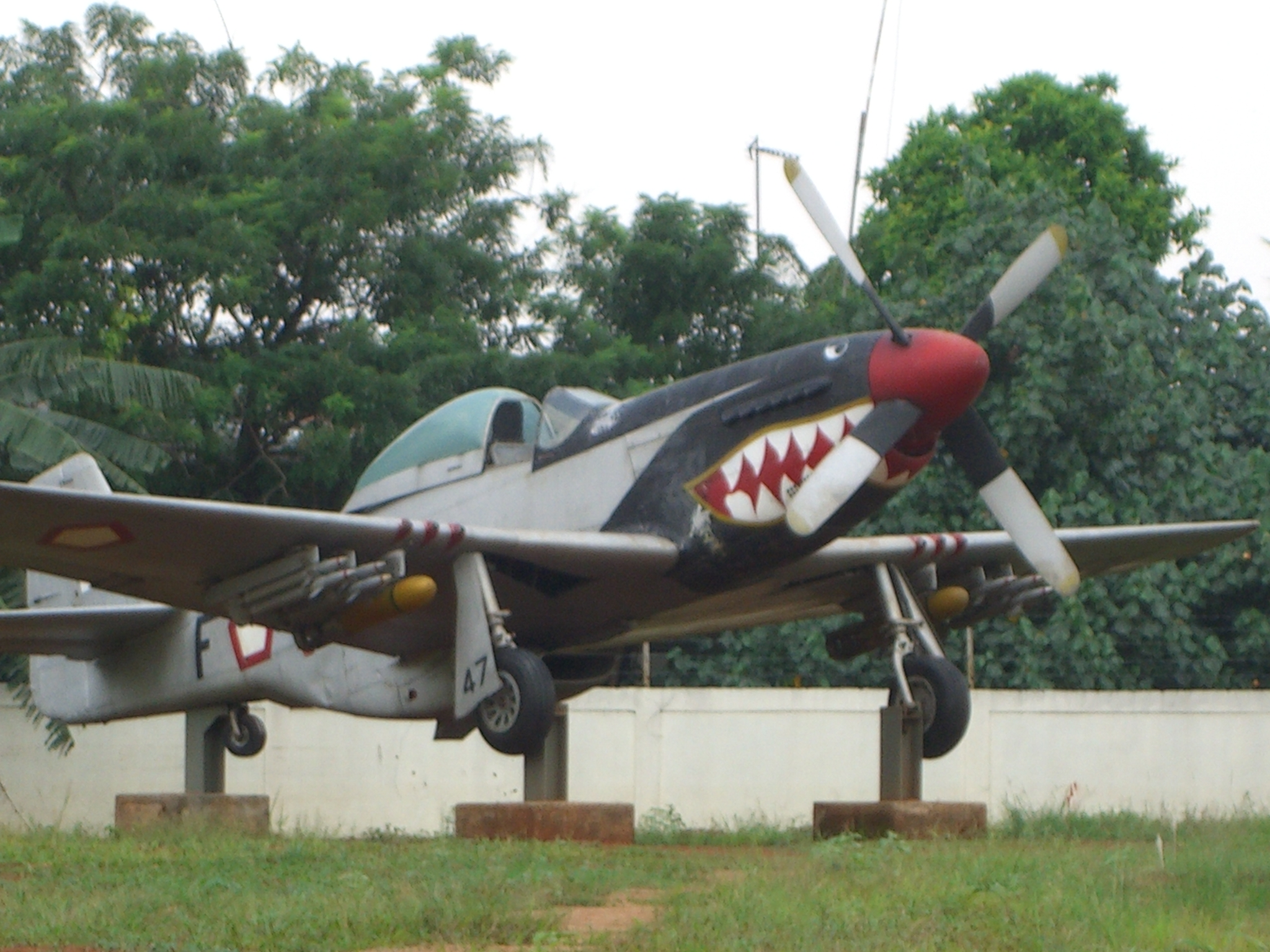
Indonesian Air Force P-51

Indonesia acquired 26 P-51D/Ks from the departing Netherlands East Indies Air Force in 1949–1950 and later received 35 P-51Ds from the United States in 1960–1961. The Mustangs were used against numerous rebellions during the 1950s, such as the CIA-backed Permesta rebels in 1958–1961. During this period, the Mustang scored the first and (as of 2022) the only aerial victory of the Indonesian Air Force, when on 18 May 1958, a P-51D Mustang piloted by Capt. Ignatius Dewanto shot down a Permesta's Revolutionary Air Force B-26 Invader piloted by Allen Lawrence Pope near Ambon. They were also used against Commonwealth (RAF, RAAF, and RNZAF) forces during the Indonesia–Malaysia confrontation in the early 1960s. Indonesia received a shipment of five or seven Cavalier II Mustangs and one TF-51D (without tip tanks) delivered in 1972–1973 as part of "Peace Pony" program under the Mutual Defense Assistance Act. The last time Mustangs were deployed for military purposes was during the "Wibawa V" exercise at Mount Lawu, Magetan in February 1975. The Indonesian Mustangs were also used for filming Janur Kuning, which was released in 1980. The Mustangs were replaced in 1976.

Israel

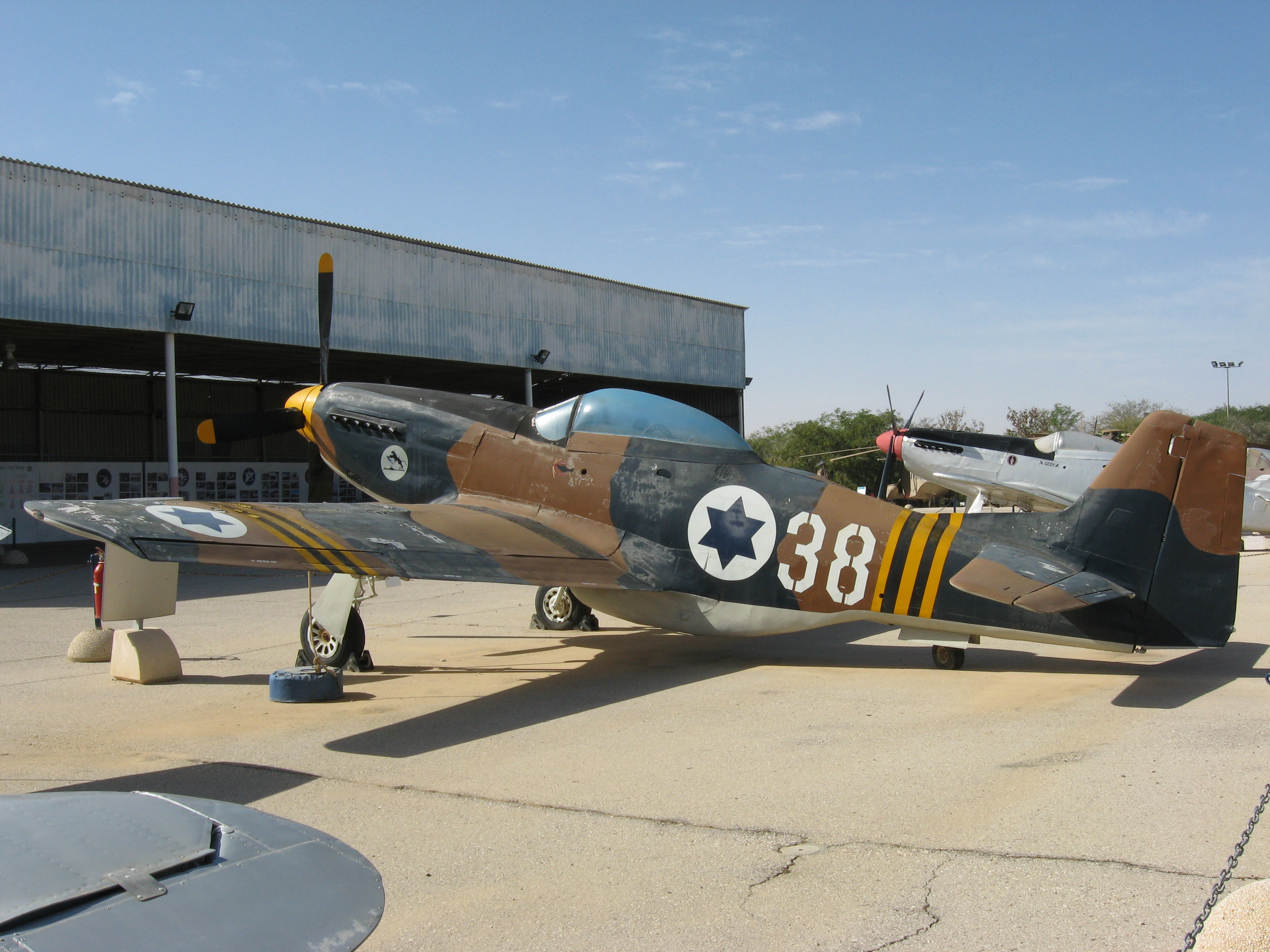
A P-51D at the Israeli Air Force Museum: The marking beneath the cockpit notes its participation in the wire-cutting operation at the onset of the Suez Crisis.

A few P-51 Mustangs were illegally bought by Israel in 1948, crated, and smuggled into the country as agricultural equipment for use in the 1947–1949 Palestine war, serving alongside upwards of 23 Avia S-199 fighters (Czech-built Messerschmitt Bf 109Gs) in Israeli service, with the Mustangs quickly establishing themselves as the best fighter in the Israeli inventory. Further aircraft were bought from Sweden and were replaced by jets at the end of the 1950s, but not before the type was used in the Suez Crisis, at the opening of Operation Kadesh. In conjunction with a surprise parachute drop at the Mitla Pass, four P-51s were specially detailed to cut telephone and telegraph wires using their wings in extreme low level runs, which resulted in major interruptions to Egyptian communications.

Italy

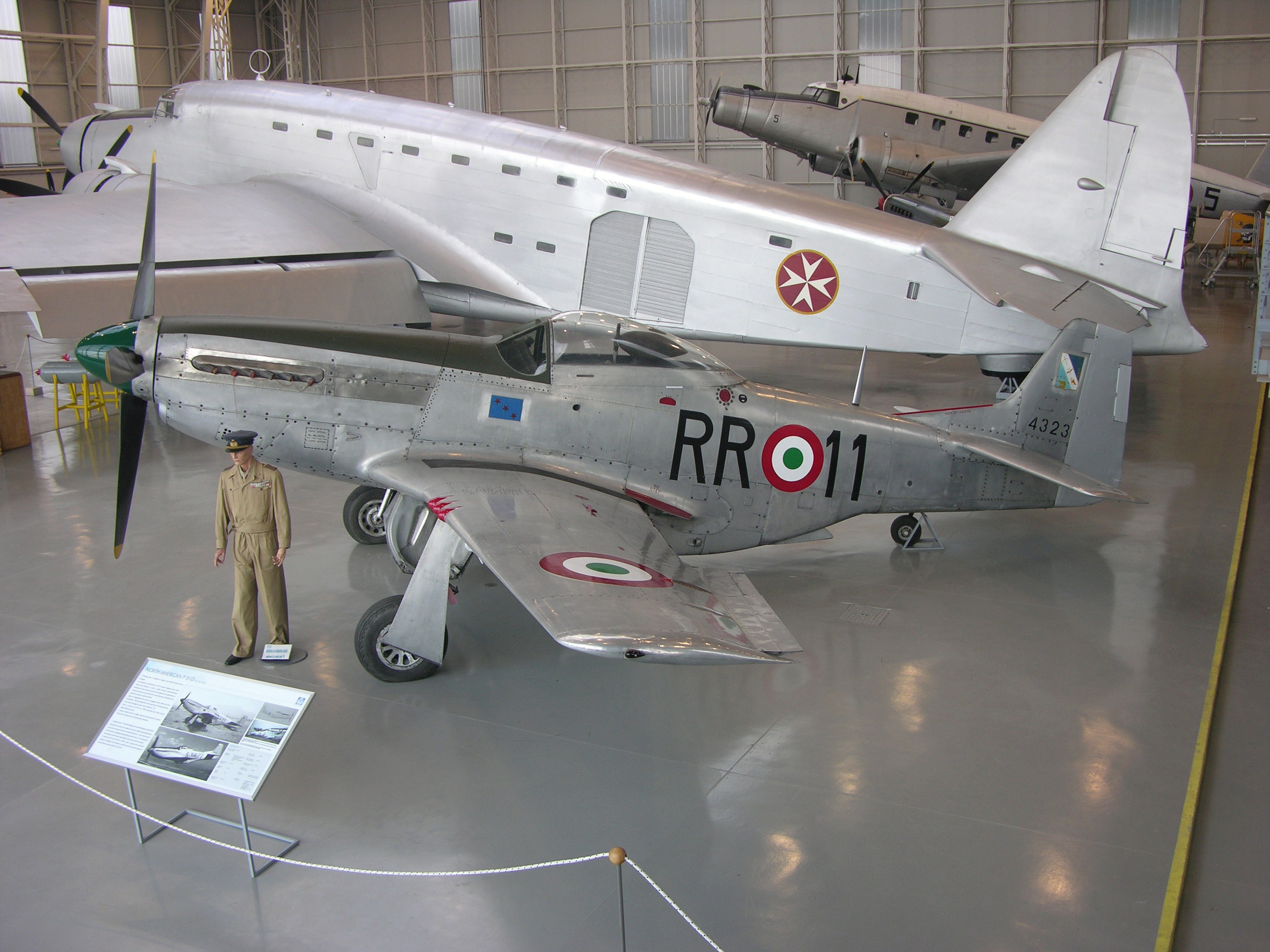
Italian P-51D Mustang

Italy was a postwar operator of P-51Ds; deliveries were slowed by the Korean War, but between September 1947 and January 1951, by MDAP count, 173 examples were delivered. They were used in all the AMI fighter units: 2, 3, 4, 5, 6 and 51 Stormo (wing), plus some employed in schools and experimental units. Considered a "glamorous" fighter, P-51s were even used as personal aircraft by several Italian commanders. Some restrictions were placed on its use due to unfavorable flying characteristics. Handling had to be done with much care when fuel tanks were fully used, and several aerobatic maneuvers were forbidden. Overall, the P-51D was highly rated even compared to the other primary postwar fighter in Italian service, the Supermarine Spitfire, partly because these P-51Ds were in very good condition in contrast to all other Allied fighters supplied to Italy. Phasing out of the Mustang began in mid-1958.

Japan
The P-51C-11-NT Evalina, marked as "278" (former USAAF serial: 44-10816) and flown by 26th FS, 51st FG, was hit by gunfire on 16 January 1945 and belly-landed on Suchon Airfield in China, which was held by the Japanese. The Japanese repaired the aircraft, roughly applied Hinomaru roundels and flew the aircraft to the Fussa evaluation center (now Yokota Air Base) in Japan.

Netherlands

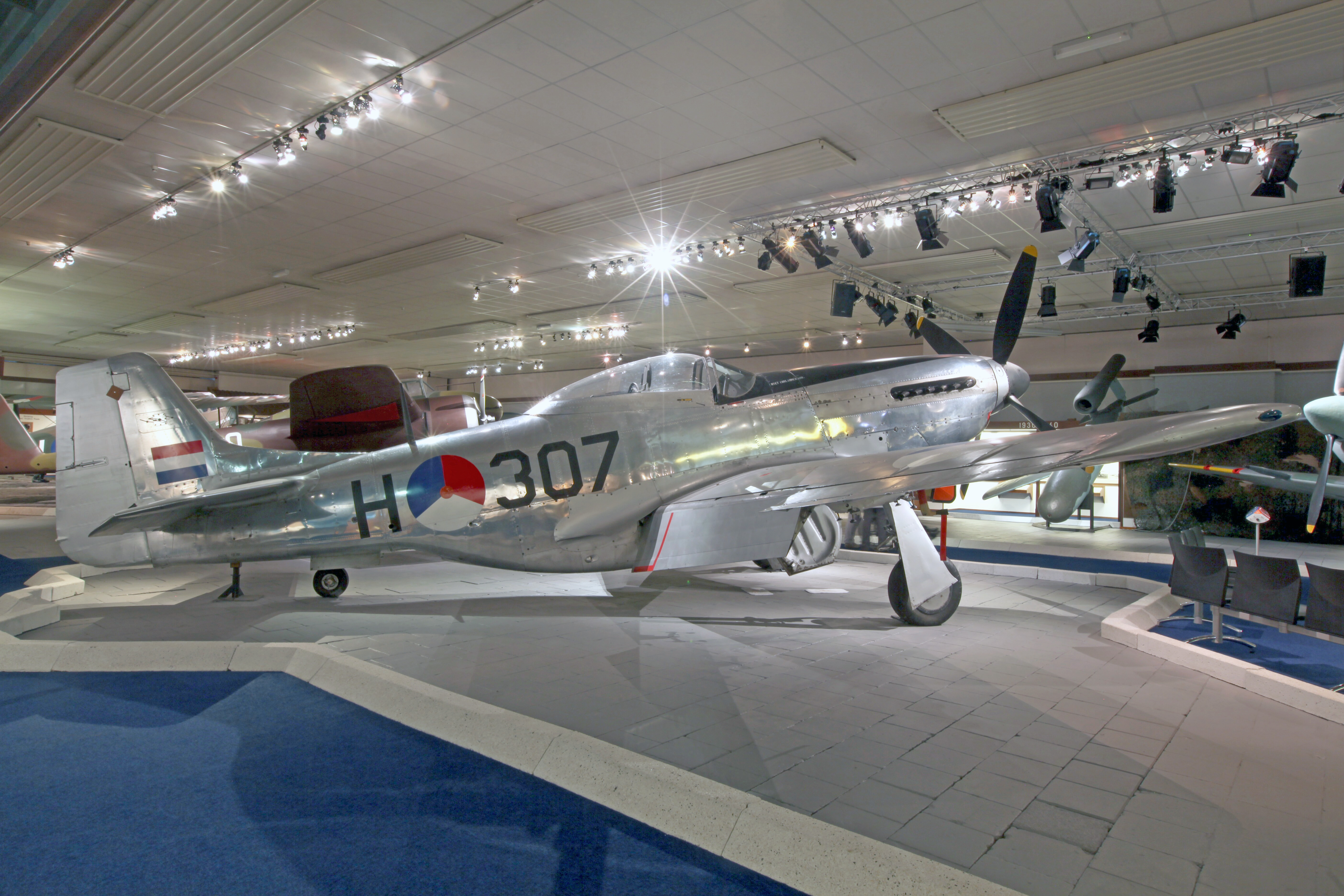
Netherlands North American P-51 Mustang

The Royal Netherlands East Indies Army Air Force received 40 P-51Ds and flew them in the course of the Indonesian National Revolution, particularly during the two Dutch police actions: Operation Product in 1947 and Operation Kraai in 1948–1949. When the conflict was over, Indonesia received 26 of these Mustangs.

New Zealand

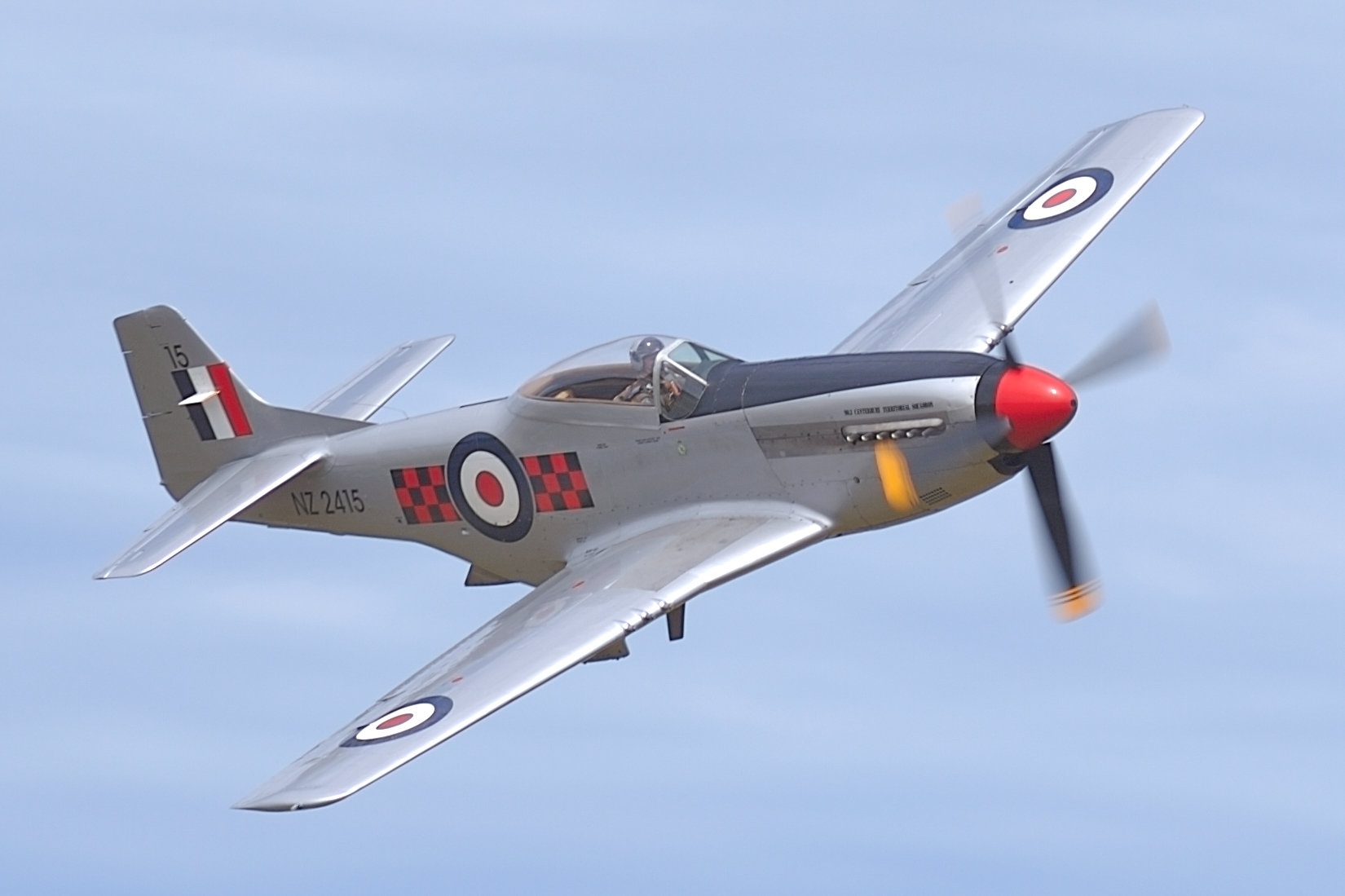
P-51D in 3 (Canterbury) Squadron TAF livery, performing at 2007 Wings over Wairarapa airshow

New Zealand ordered 370 P-51 Mustangs to supplement its F4U Corsairs in the Pacific Ocean Areas theater. Scheduled deliveries were for an initial batch of 30 P-51Ds, followed by 137 more P-51Ds and 203 P-51Ms. The original 30 were being shipped as the war ended in August 1945; these were stored in their packing cases, and the order for the additional Mustangs was canceled. In 1951, the stored Mustangs entered service in 1 (Auckland), 2 (Wellington), 3 (Canterbury), and 4 (Otago) squadrons of the Territorial Air Force (TAF). The Mustangs remained in service until they were prematurely retired in August 1955 following a series of problems with undercarriage and coolant-system corrosion problems. Four Mustangs served on as target tugs until the TAF was disbanded in 1957. RNZAF pilots in the Royal Air Force also flew the P-51 and at least one New Zealand pilot scored victories over Europe while on loan to a USAAF P-51 squadron.

Nicaragua
The Nicaraguan National Guard purchased 26 P-51D Mustangs from Sweden in 1954 and later received 30 P-51D Mustangs from the US together with two TF-51 models from MAP after 1954. All aircraft of this type were retired from service by 1964.

Philippines

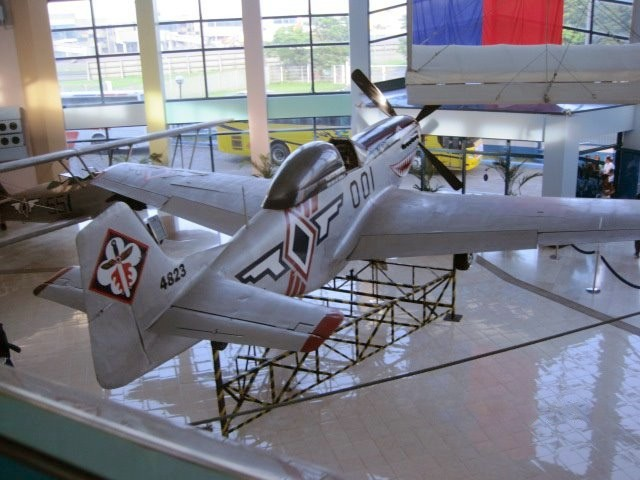
Philippine Air Force P-51D: The tailwheels were fixed in the extended position.

The Philippines acquired 103 P-51D Mustangs after World War II, operated by the 6th "Cobras", 7th "Bulldogs" and 8th "Scorpions" tactical fighter squadrons of the 5th Fighter Wing. These became the backbone of the postwar Philippine Army Air Corps and Philippine Air Force, and were used extensively during the Huk campaign, fighting against communist insurgents, as well as the suppression of Moro rebels led by Hadji Kamlon in southern Philippines until 1955. The Mustangs were also the first aircraft of the Philippine air demonstration team, which was formed in 1953 and given the name the Blue Diamonds the following year. The Mustangs were replaced by 56 F-86 Sabres in the late 1950s, but some were still in service for COIN roles up to the early 1980s.

Poland
During World War II, five Polish Air Force in Great Britain squadrons used Mustangs. The first Polish unit equipped (7 June 1942) with Mustang Mk Is was "B" Flight of 309 "Ziemi Czerwieńskiej" Squadron (Note: "Ziemi Czerwieńskiej" = "Land of Czerwien", RAF Polish units retained the name and the logo of a squadron from the Polish Air Force which fought the Germans in 1939.) (an Army Co-Operation Command unit), followed by "A" Flight in March 1943. Subsequently, 309 Squadron was redesignated a fighter/reconnaissance unit and became part of Fighter Command. On 13 March 1944, 316 "Warszawski" Squadron received their first Mustang Mk IIIs; rearming of the unit was completed by the end of April. By 26 March 1944, 306 "Toruński" Sqn and 315 "Dębliński" Sqn received Mustangs Mk IIIs (the whole operation took 12 days). On 20 October 1944, Mustang Mk Is in 309 Squadron were replaced by Mk IIIs. On 11 December 1944, the unit was again renamed, becoming 309 Dywizjon Myśliwski "Ziemi Czerwieńskiej" or 309 "Land of Czerwien" Polish Fighter Squadron. In 1945, 303 "Kościuszko" Sqn received 20 Mustangs Mk IV/Mk IVA replacements. Postwar, between 6 December 1946 and 6 January 1947, all five Polish squadrons equipped with Mustangs were disbanded. Poland returned about 80 Mustang Mk IIIs and 20 Mustangs Mk IV/IVAs to the RAF, which transferred them to the US government.

Somalia
The Somali Air Force operated eight P-51Ds in post-World War II service.

South Africa

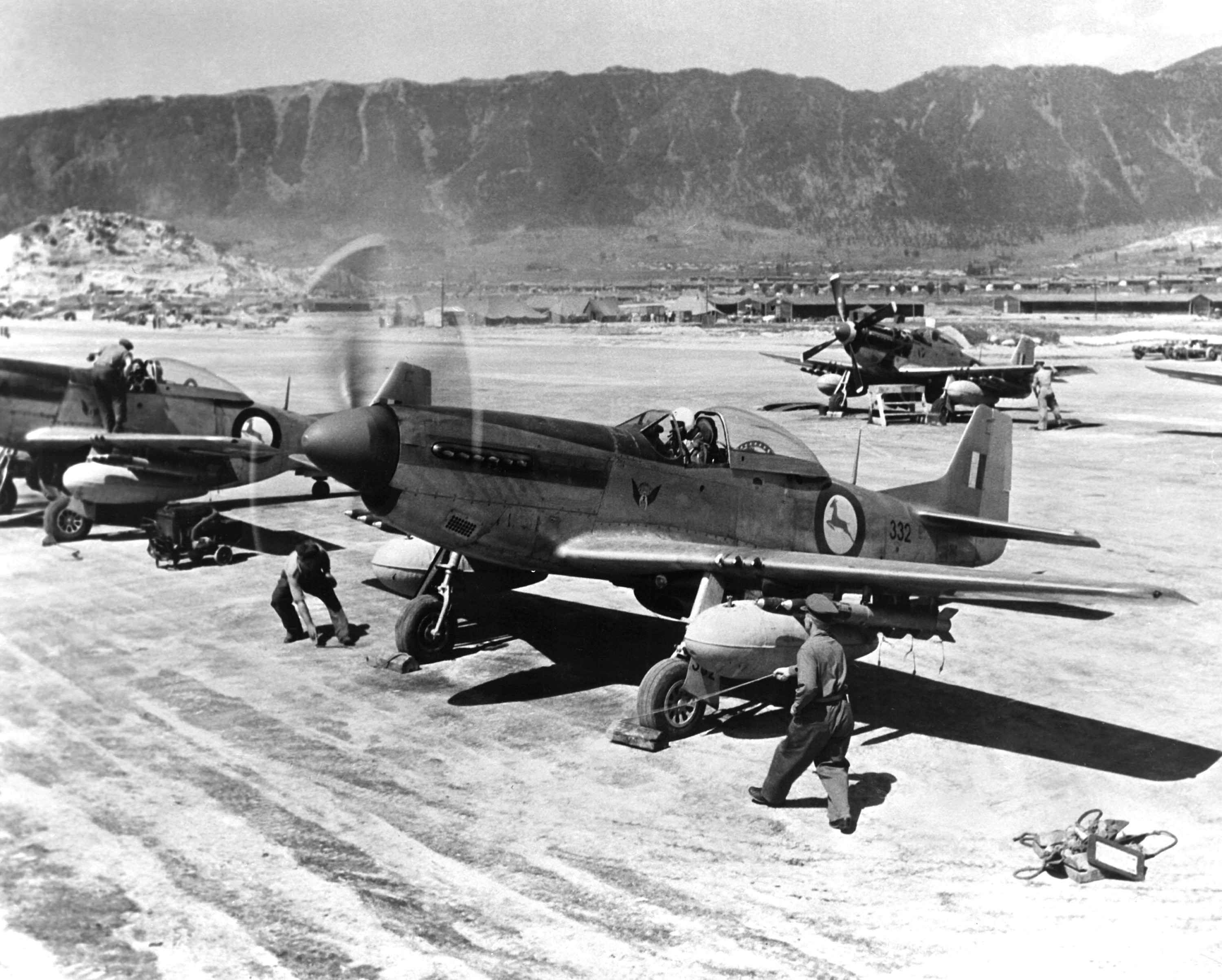
North American F-51D Mustang fighters of No. 2 Squadron of the South African Air Force in Korea, on 1 May 1951

No.5 Squadron South African Air Force operated Mustang Mk IIIs (P-51B/C) and Mk IVs (P-51D/K) in Italy during World War II, beginning in September 1944, when the squadron converted to the Mustang Mk III from Kittyhawks. The Mk IV and Mk IVA came into SA service in March 1945. These aircraft were generally camouflaged in the British style, having been drawn from RAF stocks; all carried RAF serial numbers and were struck off charge and scrapped in October 1945. In 1950, 2 Squadron SAAF was supplied with F-51D Mustangs by the United States for Korean War service. The type performed well in South African hands before being replaced by the F-86 Sabre in 1952 and 1953.

South Korea

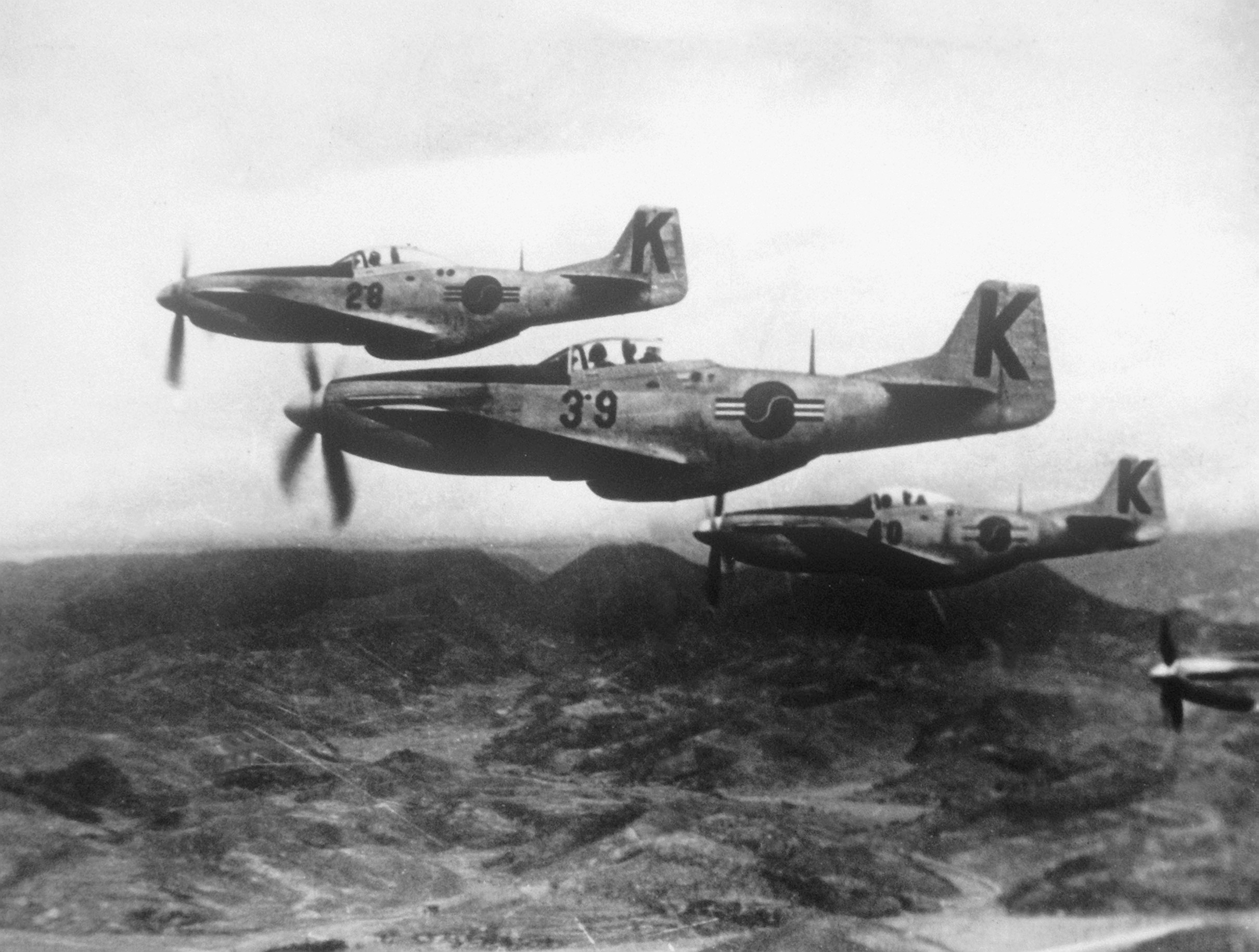
The F-51D in ROKAF service

Within a month of the outbreak of the Korean War, 10 F-51D Mustangs were provided to the badly depleted Republic of Korea Air Force as a part of the Bout One Project. They were flown by both South Korean airmen, several of whom were veterans of the Imperial Japanese Army and Navy air services during World War II, as well as by US advisers led by Major Dean Hess. Later, more were provided both from US and from South African stocks, as the latter were converting to F-86 Sabres. They formed the backbone of the South Korean Air Force until they were replaced by Sabres.
It also served with the ROKAF Black Eagles aerobatic team, until retired in 1954.

Sweden

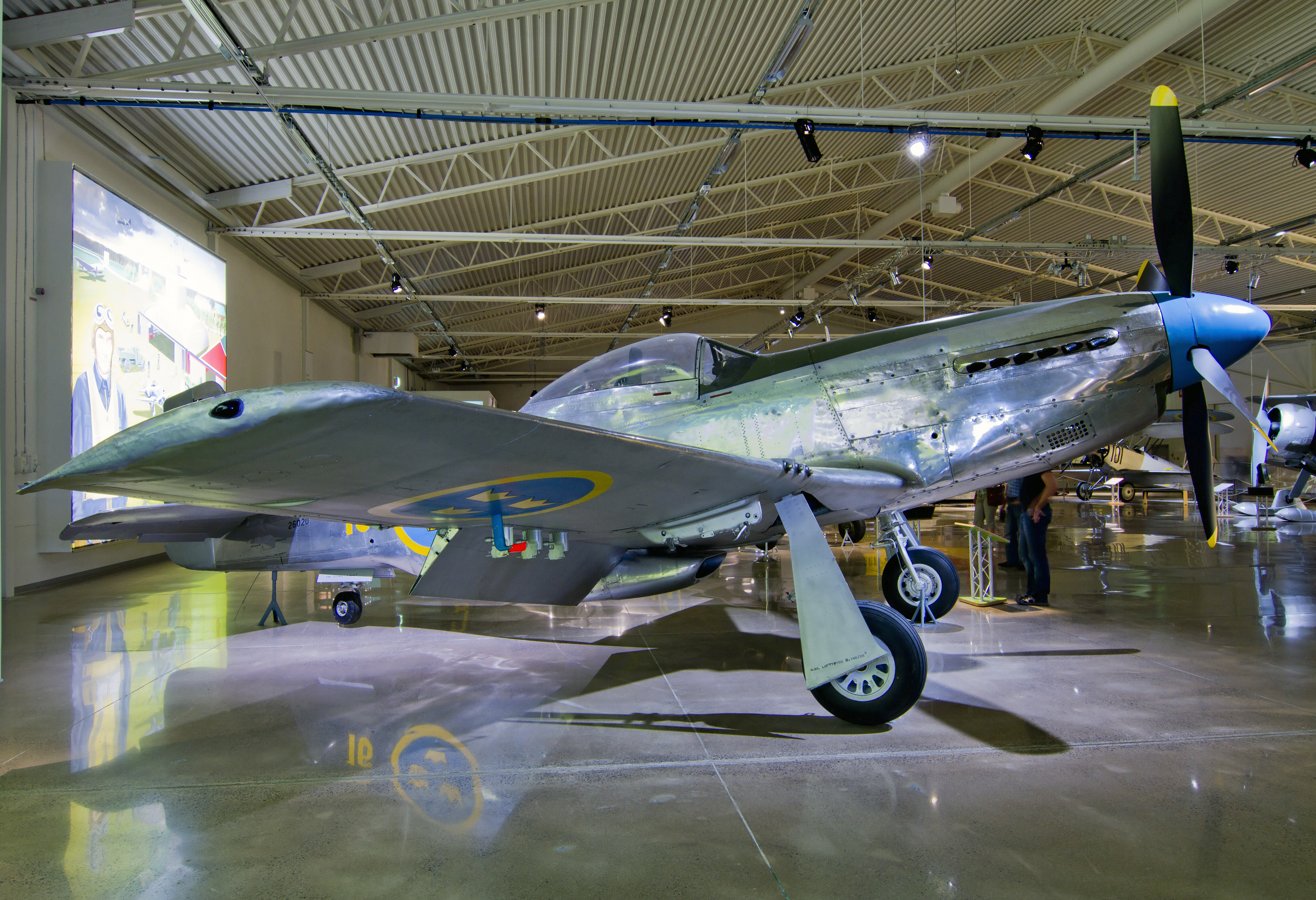
Swedish Air Force J 26 on display at Swedish Air Force Museum

Sweden's Flygvapnet first recuperated four of the P-51s (two P-51Bs and two early P-51Ds) that had been diverted to Sweden during missions over Europe. In February 1945, Sweden purchased 50 P-51Ds designated J 26, which were delivered by American pilots in April and assigned to the Uppland Wing (F 16) at Uppsala as interceptors. In early 1946, the Jämtland Wing (F 4) at Östersund was equipped with a second batch of 90 P-51Ds. A final batch of 21 Mustangs was purchased in 1948. In all, 161 J 26s served in the Swedish Air Force during the late 1940s. About 12 were modified for photo reconnaissance and redesignated S 26. Some of these aircraft participated in the secret Swedish mapping of new Soviet military installations at the Baltic coast in 1946–47 (Operation Falun), an endeavor that entailed many intentional violations of Soviet airspace. However, the Mustang could outdive any Soviet fighter of that era, so no S 26s were lost in these missions. The J 26s were replaced by De Havilland Vampires around 1950. The S 26s were replaced by S 29Cs in the early 1950s.

Switzerland

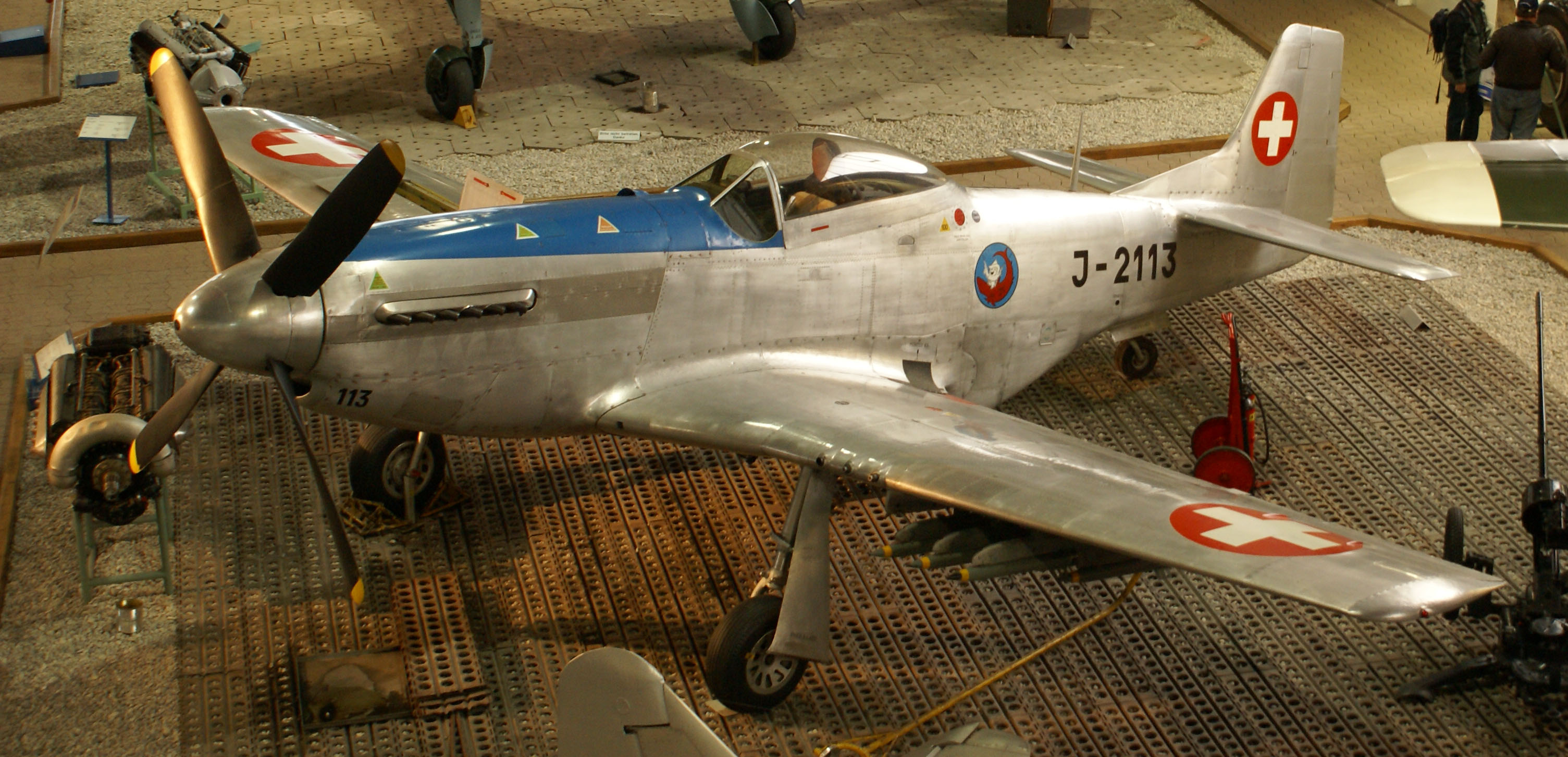
A restored Swiss Air Force P-51D at the Flieger-Flab-Museum

The Swiss Air Force operated a few USAAF P-51s that had been impounded by Swiss authorities during World War II after the pilots were forced to land in neutral Switzerland. After the war, Switzerland also bought 130 P-51s for $4,000 each. They served until 1958.

Soviet Union
The Soviet Union received at least 10 early-model ex-RAF Mustang Mk Is and tested them, but found them to "under-perform" compared to contemporary USSR fighters, relegating them to training units. Later Lend-Lease deliveries of the P-51B/C and D series, along with other Mustangs abandoned in Russia after the famous "shuttle missions", were repaired and used by the Soviet Air Force, but not in front-line service.

Uruguay
The Uruguayan Air Force used 25 P-51D Mustangs from 1950 to 1960; some were subsequently sold to Bolivia.

=== P-51s and civil aviation ===
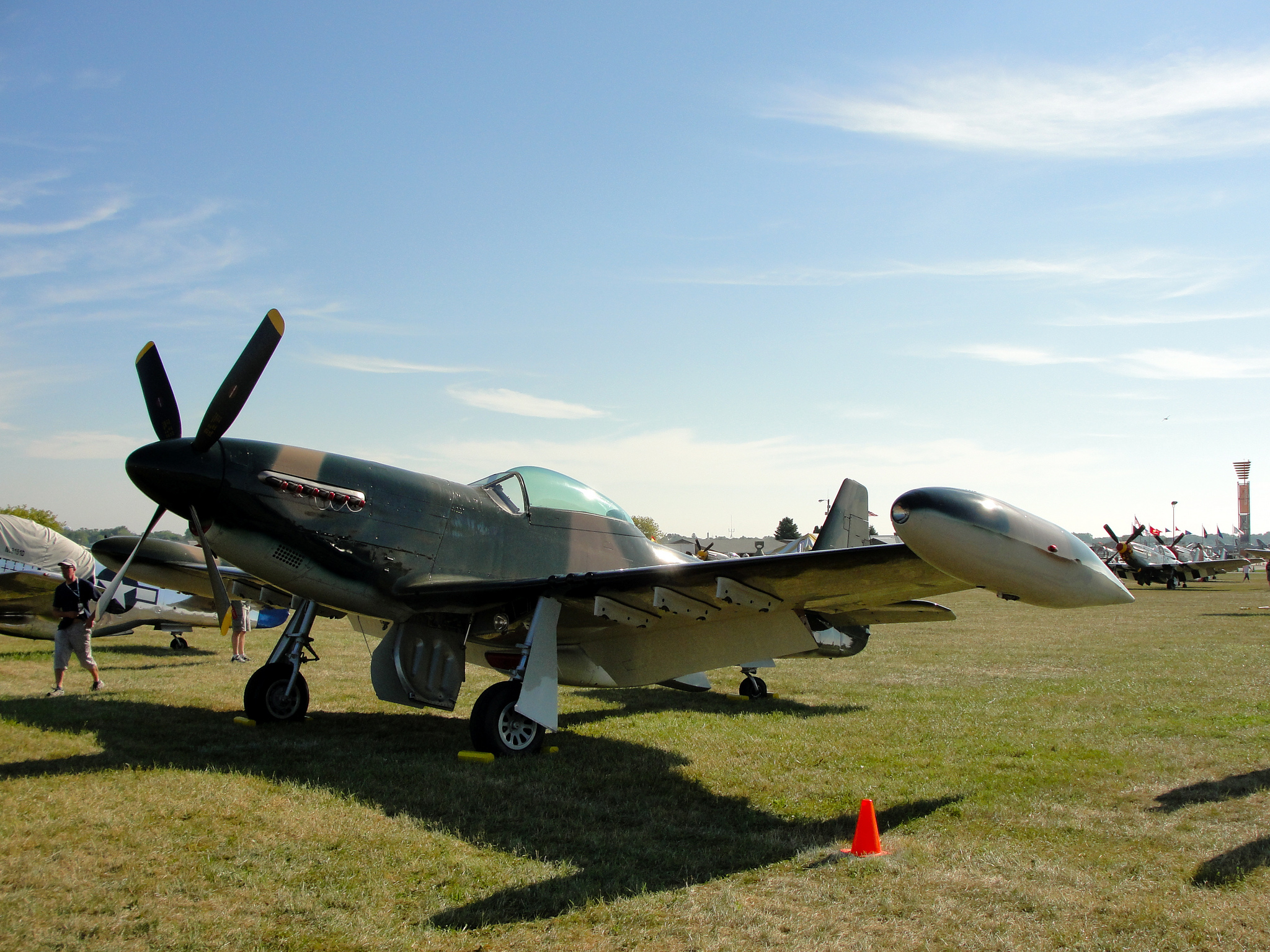
Cavalier P-51 Mustang with tiptanks

Many P-51s were sold as surplus after the war, often for as little as $1,500. Some were sold to former wartime fliers or other aficionados for personal use, while others were modified for air racing.

One of the most significant Mustangs involved in air racing was serial number 44-10947, a surplus P-51C-10-NT purchased by film stunt pilot Paul Mantz. He modified the wings, sealing them to create a giant fuel tank in each one; these "wet wings" reduced the need for fuel stops or drag-inducing drop tanks. Named Blaze of Noon after the film Blaze of Noon, the aircraft won the 1946 and 1947 Bendix Air Races, took second in the 1948 Bendix, and placed third in the 1949 Bendix. Mantz also set a US coast-to-coast record in 1947. He sold the Mustang to Charles F. Blair Jr (future husband of Maureen O'Hara), who renamed it Excalibur III and used it to set a New York-to-London (about 3,460 miles or 5,570 kilometres) record in 1951: 7 hr 48 min from takeoff at Idlewild to overhead London Airport. Later that year, Blair flew from Norway to Fairbanks, Alaska, via the North Pole (about 3,130 miles or 5,040 kilometres), proving that navigation via sun sights was possible over the magnetic North Pole region. For this feat, he was awarded the Harmon Trophy and the Air Force was forced to change its thoughts on a possible Soviet air strike from the north. This Mustang now sits in the National Air and Space Museum's Steven F. Udvar-Hazy Center.

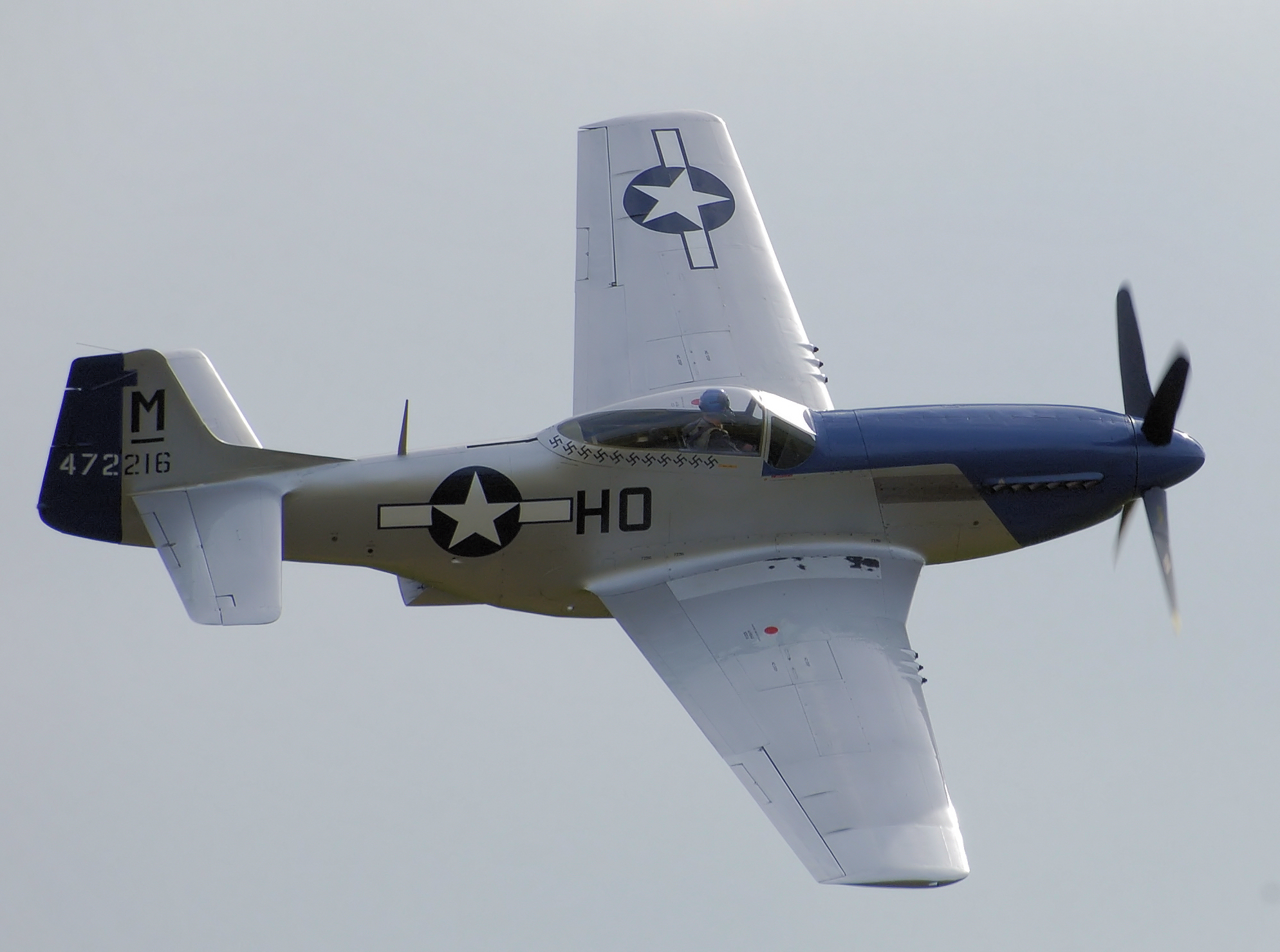
Miss Helen, a P-51D in its wartime markings as flown by Capt. Raymond H. Littge of the 487 FS, 352 FG, on aerial display in 2007: It is the last original 352 FG P-51 known to exist.

In 1958, the RCAF retired its 78 remaining Mustangs. RCAF pilot Lynn Garrison ferried them from their various storage locations to Canastota, New York, where the American buyers were based. Garrison flew each of the surviving aircraft at least once. These aircraft make up a large percentage of the aircraft presently flying worldwide.

The most prominent firm to convert Mustangs to civilian use was Trans-Florida Aviation, later renamed Cavalier Aircraft Corporation, which produced the Cavalier Mustang. Modifications included a taller tailfin and wingtip tanks. Conversions included a Cavalier Mustang specialty: a "tight" second seat added in the space formerly occupied by the military radio and fuselage fuel tank.

In the late 1960s and early 1970s, when the United States Department of Defense wished to supply aircraft to South American countries and later Indonesia for close air support and counterinsurgency, it paid Cavalier to return some of their civilian conversions back to updated military specifications.

In the 21st century, a P-51 can command a price of more than $1 million, even for only partially restored aircraft. There were 204 privately owned P-51s in the US on the FAA registry in 2011, most of which are still flying, often associated with organizations such as the Commemorative Air Force (formerly the Confederate Air Force).

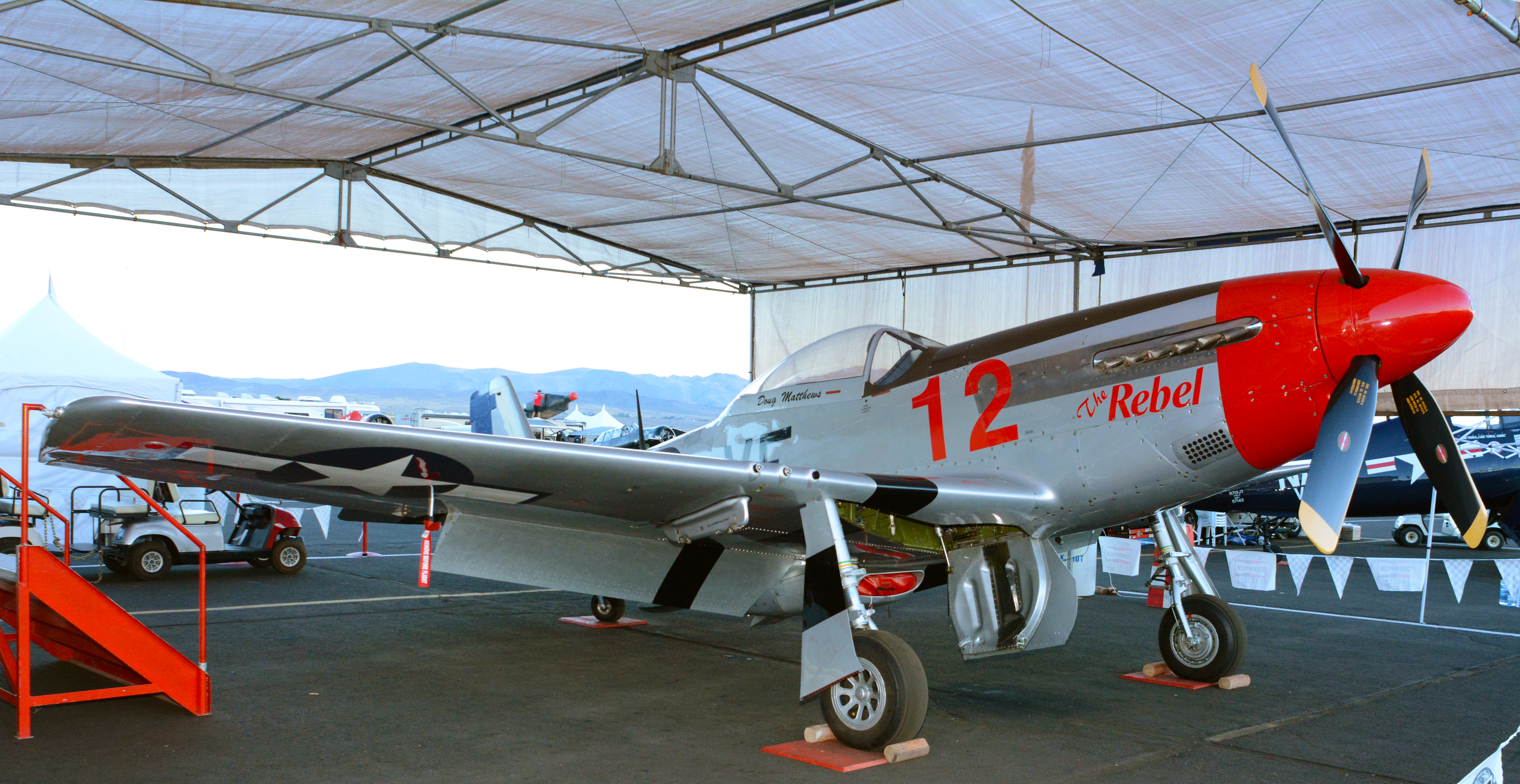
The Rebel, a P-51D-25-NT, at the 2014 Reno Air Races

In May 2013, Doug Matthews set an altitude record of 12,975 m (42,568 ft) in a P-51 named The Rebel for piston-powered aircraft weighing 3,000 to 6,000 kg (6,600 to 13,200 lb). Flying from a grass runway at Florida's Indiantown airport and over Lake Okeechobee, Matthews set world records for time to reach altitudes of 9,000 m (30,000 ft), 18 minutes and 12,000 m (39,000 ft), 31 minutes. He set a level-flight altitude record of 12,200 m (40,100 ft) in level flight and an absolute altitude record of 13,000 m (42,500 ft), breaking the previous record of 11,248 m (36,902 ft) set in 1954.

==== Incidents ====
- On 9 June 1973, William Penn Patrick (43) a certified pilot and his passenger, Christian Hagert, died when Patrick's P-51 Mustang crashed in Lakeport, California.
- On 1 July 1990 at the National Capital Air Show (Ottawa, Ontario, Canada), Harry E. Tope was killed when his P-51 Mustang crashed.
- On 16 September 2011 The Galloping Ghost, a modified P-51 piloted by Jimmy Leeward of Ocala, Florida, crashed during an air race in Reno, Nevada. Leeward and at least nine people on the ground were killed when the racer suddenly crashed near the edge of the grandstand.

== Variants ==
Over 20 variants of the P-51 Mustang were produced from 1940 to after the war.

=== Production ===
Except for the small numbers assembled or produced in Australia, all Mustangs were built by North American initially at Inglewood, California, but then additionally in Dallas, Texas.

North American-built airframes
Variant	Number built	Notes
NA-73X	1	Prototype
XP-51	2	Prototypes
Mustang I	620	Built for RAF at Inglewood, California
A-36 Apache	500	Dive-bomber variant of P-51; also known as "Invader" or "Mustang"
P-51	150	Built at Inglewood, California. 93 were Lend-Leased to the UK, operated by RAF as the "Mustang Ia". 57 were retained by the USAAF and fitted with Allison V-1710-39 engines.
P-51A-NA	310	Built at Inglewood, California. 50 Lend-Leased to the RAF as the "Mustang II".
XP-51B	2	Prototypes of P-51B
P-51B-NA	1,987	Built at Inglewood, California. First production version to be equipped with the Merlin engine. 308 supplied under Lend-Lease and operated by the RAF as "Mustang III".
P-51C-NT	1,750	First P-51 variant to be built at North American's Dallas plant. Identical to P-51B. Mustangs built by North American in Dallas were suffixed "-NT". 636 were supplied under Lend-Lease to the RAF as the "Mustang III".
XP-51D	3	Prototypes of P-51D
P-51D-NA/-NT	8,200	6,600 built at Inglewood and 1,600 built at Dallas. 100 P-51D-1-NA were sent unassembled to Australia. 282 under Lend-Lease served in the RAF as the "Mustang IV".
XP-51F	3	Lightweight version
XP-51G	2	Lightweight version; five-bladed propeller
P-51H-NA	555	Built at Inglewood, California
XP-51J	2	Allison-engined lightweight development.
P-51K-NT	1,500	Built at Dallas, Texas. Identical to the P-51D except fitted with a four-bladed Aeroproducts propeller. 600 Lend-Leased to the RAF as the "Mustang IVa".
P-51M-NT	1	Same as P-51D-25-NT and P-51D-30-NT, but with the non-water injected V-1650-9A engine for low-altitude operations and sharing the cuffless Hamilton Standard propeller. It was intended to enter full production at Dallas, but the contract was later cancelled.
Total number built	15,588	Includes 100 sent unassembled to Australia

Australian production by Commonwealth Aircraft Corporation
Variant	Number built	Notes
Commonwealth Aircraft Corporation CA-17 Mustang Mk 20	80	100 unassembled P-51D-1-NA were delivered as kits to Australia, but only 80 were built.
CAC CA-18 Mustang Mk 21, Mk 22 and Mk 23	120	License production in Australia of 120 (170 were originally ordered) P-51D. The Mk 21 and Mk 22 used the American-built Packard V-1650-3 or V-1650-7 engine and the Mk 23 (which followed the Mk 21) was powered by a Rolls-Royce Merlin 66 or Merlin 70 engine.
Total number built	200	

Conversions of already-built Mustangs
Variant	Number converted	Notes
TP-51C	At least 5	Field modification to create dual-control variant; at least five known built during World War II for training and VIP transport.
ETF-51D	1	One P-51D modified for use on an aircraft carrier.
Rolls-Royce Mustang Mk X	5	Five prototype conversions only – two Mustang Mk I airframes were initially trial fitted with Rolls-Royce Merlin 65 engines in mid-late 1942, to test the performance of the aircraft with a powerplant better adapted to medium/high altitudes. The successful conversion of the Packard V-1650 Merlin-powered P-51B/C equivalent rendered this experiment as superfluous. Although the conversions were highly successful, the planned production of 500 examples was cancelled.

Cancelled contracts
Variant	Notes
NA-133	P-51H for the US Navy, with folding wings, an arrestor hook and tip tanks.
P-51L-NT	Lightweight version
CAC CA-21 Mustang Mk 24	License production of 250 two-seater Mustangs.

== Surviving aircraft ==
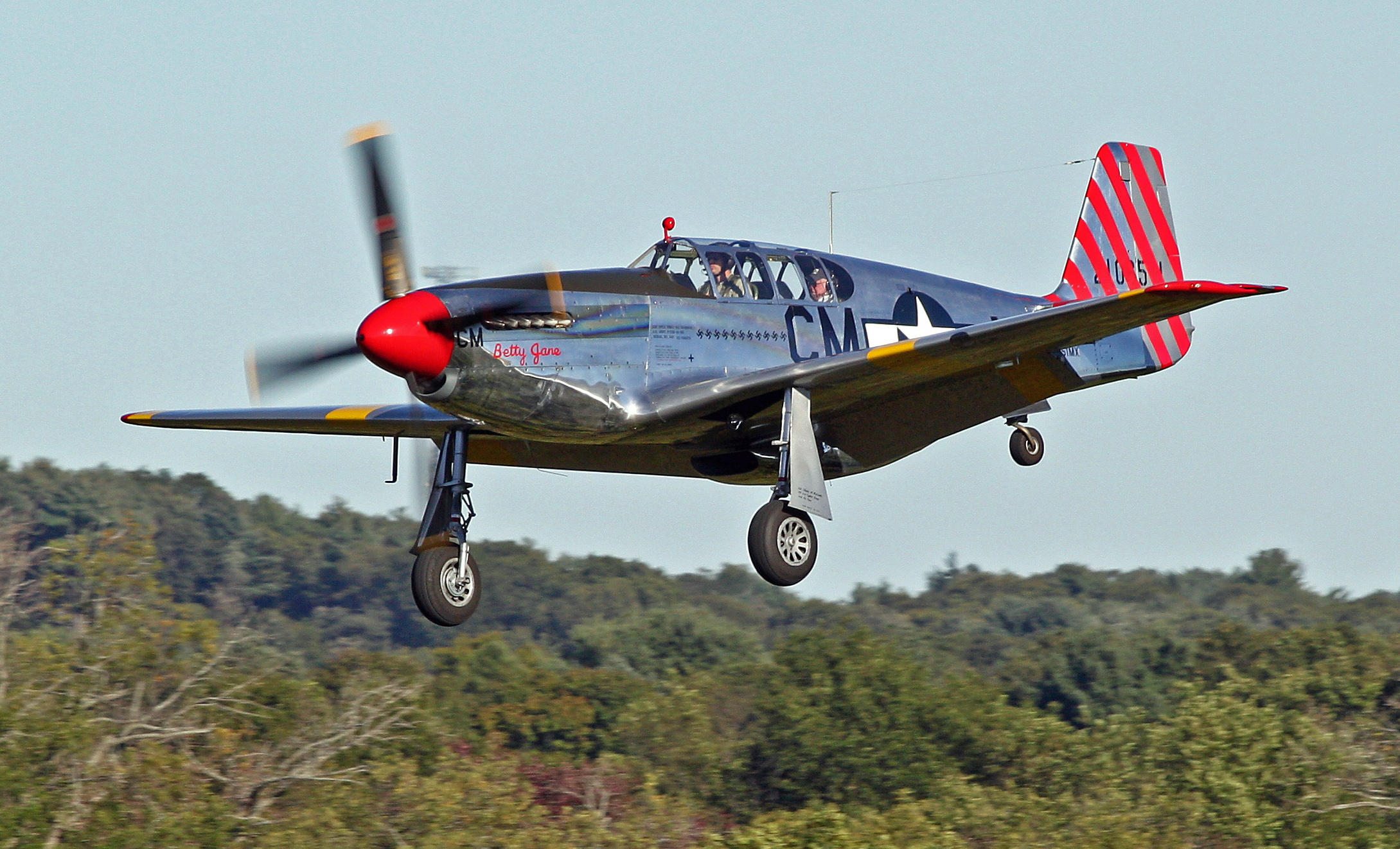
TP-51C "Betty Jane" dual control Warbird of the Collings Foundation appears at airshows around the United States

== Specifications (P-51D Mustang) ==
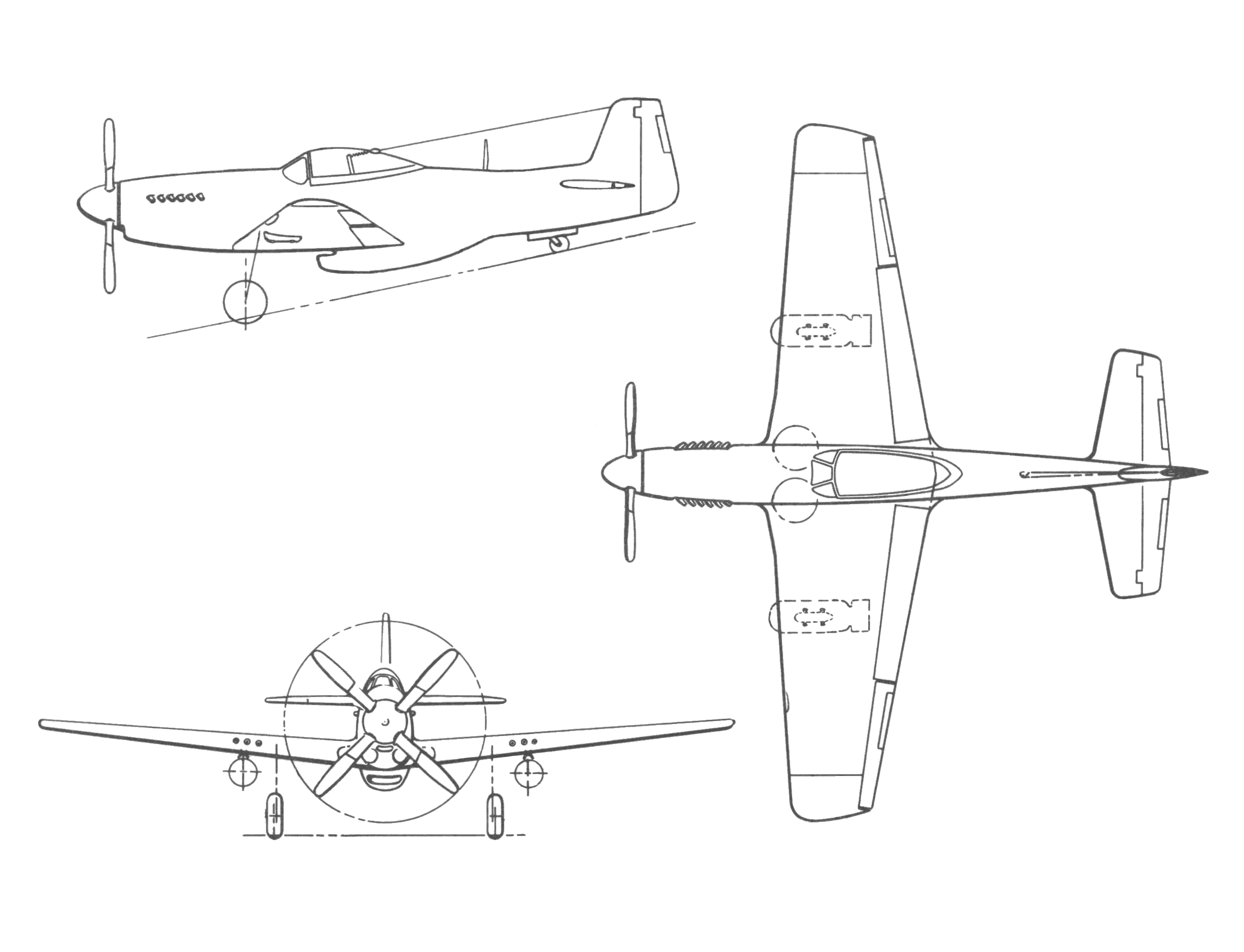
3-view drawing of P-51D Mustang

Data from Erection and Maintenance Manual for P-51D and P-51K, P-51 Tactical Planning Characteristics & Performance Chart, The Great Book of Fighters, and Quest for Performance

General characteristics

- Crew: 1
- Length: 32 ft 3 in (9.83 m)
- Wingspan: 37 ft 0 in (11.28 m)
- Height: 13 ft 4.5 in (4.077 m) tail wheel on ground, vertical propeller blade
- Wing area: 235 sq ft (21.8 m^{2})
- Aspect ratio: 5.83
- Airfoil: NAA/NACA 45–100
- Empty weight: 7,635 lb (3,463 kg)
- Gross weight: 9,200 lb (4,173 kg)
- Max takeoff weight: 12,100 lb (5,490 kg)
- Fuel capacity: 269 US gal (224 imp gal; 1,020 L)
- Zero-lift drag coefficient: 0.0163
- Drag area: 3.80 sqft (0.35 m²)
- Powerplant: 1 × Packard (Rolls-Royce) V-1650-7 Merlin 12-cylinder liquid cooled engine, 1,490 hp (1,110 kW) at 3,000 rpm; 1,720 hp (1,280 kW) at WEP
- Propellers: 4-bladed Hamilton Standard constant-speed, variable-pitch, 11 ft 2 in (3.40 m) diameter

Performance

- Maximum speed: 440 mph (710 km/h, 383 kn)
- Cruise speed: 362 mph (583 km/h, 315 kn)
- Stall speed: 100 mph (160 km/h, 87 kn)
- Range: 1,650 mi (2,660 km, 1,434 nmi) with external tanks
- Service ceiling: 41,900 ft (12,800 m)
- Rate of climb: 3,200 ft/min (16 m/s)
- Lift-to-drag: 14.6
- Wing loading: 39 lb/sq ft (190 kg/m^{2})
- Power/mass: 0.162 / 0.187 hp/lb (0.266 / 0.307 kW/kg) (without / with WEP)
- Recommended Mach limit 0.8

Armament

- Guns: 6 × .50 caliber (12.7mm) AN/M2 Browning machine guns with 1,840 total rounds (380 rounds for each on the inboard pair and 270 rounds for each of the outer two pair)
- Rockets: 6 or 10 × 5.0 in (127 mm) T64 HVAR rockets (P-51D-25, P-51K-10 on) (Note: The P-51D and K Maintenance manual notes that carrying 1,000 lb bombs was not recommended, because the racks were not designed for them. Six rockets could be carried on removable "Zero Rail" launchers with the wing racks installed, 10 without wing racks.)
- Bombs: 1 × 100 lb (45 kg) or 250 lb (110 kg) bomb or 500 lb (230 kg) bomb on hardpoint under each wing

== Notable appearances in media ==
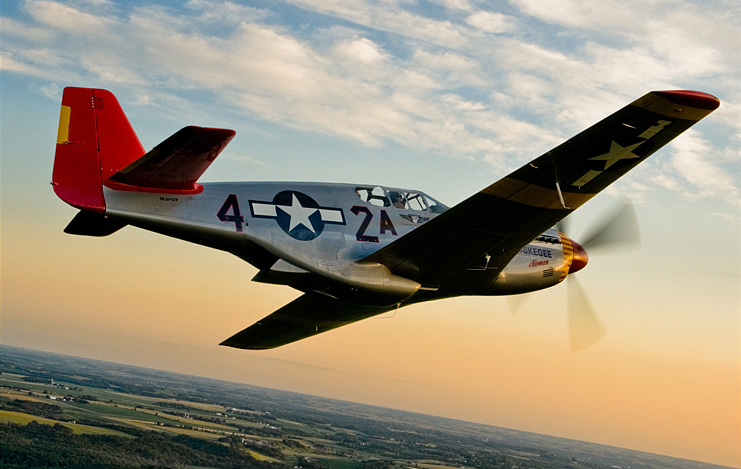
The restored P-51C Mustang associated with the Tuskegee Airmen now flown by Red Tail Project as described in Red Tail Reborn

- Red Tail Reborn (2007) is the story behind the restoration of a flying memorial aircraft.

== Scale replicas ==
As indicative of the iconic nature of the P-51, manufacturers within the hobby industry have created scale plastic model kits of the P-51 Mustang, with varying degrees of detail and skill levels. The aircraft have also been the subject of numerous scale flying replicas. Aside from the popular model aircraft, several kitplane manufacturers offer 1/2, 2/3, and 3/4-scale replicas capable of comfortably seating one (or even two) and offering high performance combined with more forgiving flight characteristics. Such aircraft include the Titan T-51 Mustang, W.A.R. P-51 Mustang, Linn Mini Mustang, Jurca Gnatsum, Thunder Mustang, Stewart S-51D Mustang, Loehle 5151 Mustang and ScaleWings SW51 Mustang.

== See also ==
Related development

- CAC CA-15
- North American FJ-1 Fury

Aircraft of comparable role, configuration, and era

- Fisher P-75 Eagle
- Fiat G.55 Centauro
- Hawker Typhoon/Tempest
- Kawanishi N1K
- Kawasaki Ki-61
- Lavochkin La-5/La-7/La-9
- Macchi C.205 Veltro
- Mitsubishi A6M3/4/5/6/7/8 "Zero"
- Mitsubishi J2M
- Nakajima Ki-44
- Vought F4U Corsair
- Yakovlev Yak-9/Yak-3

Related lists

- Allied technological cooperation during World War II
- List of aircraft of the United Kingdom in World War II
- List of aircraft of World War II
- List of fighter aircraft
- List of military aircraft of the United States
