= North American P-51 Mustang variants =

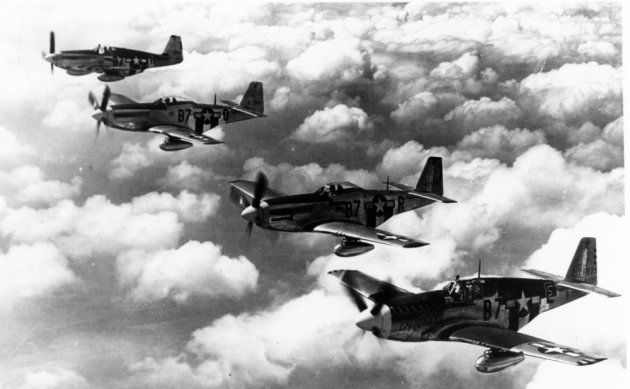
Two P-51B/C Mustangs flying with two P-51D/K Mustangs

Over twenty variants of the North American P-51 Mustang fighter were produced from 1940, when it first flew, to after World War II, some of which were employed also in the Korean War and in several other conflicts.

== Allison-engined Mustangs ==
=== NA-73X ===
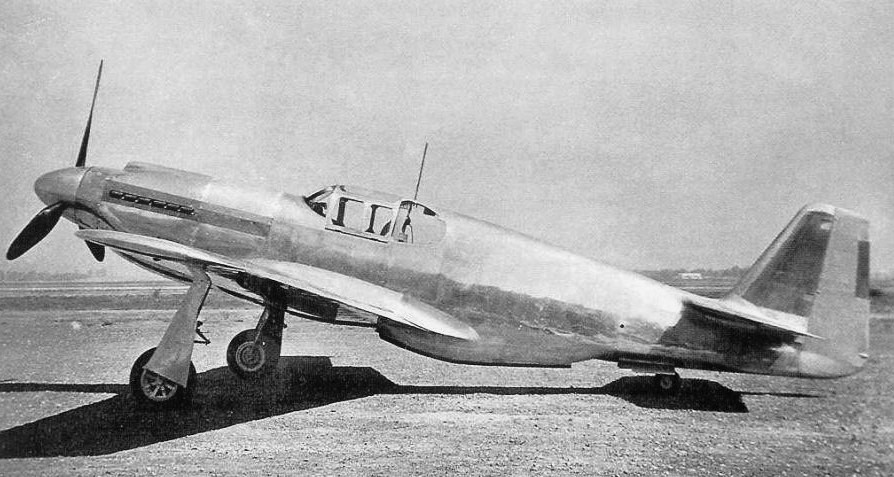
The North American NA-73X

The prototype of the Mustang, designated NA-73X, was rolled out by North American Aviation on 9 September 1940, albeit without an engine, and was first flown the following 26 October. The Mustang was originally designed to use a low-altitude rated Allison V-1710 engine. Unlike later models, Allison-powered Mustangs were characterized by the carburetor air intake placed on the dorsal surface of the nose, immediately behind the propeller.

=== Mustang Mk I (NA-73 and NA-83) ===
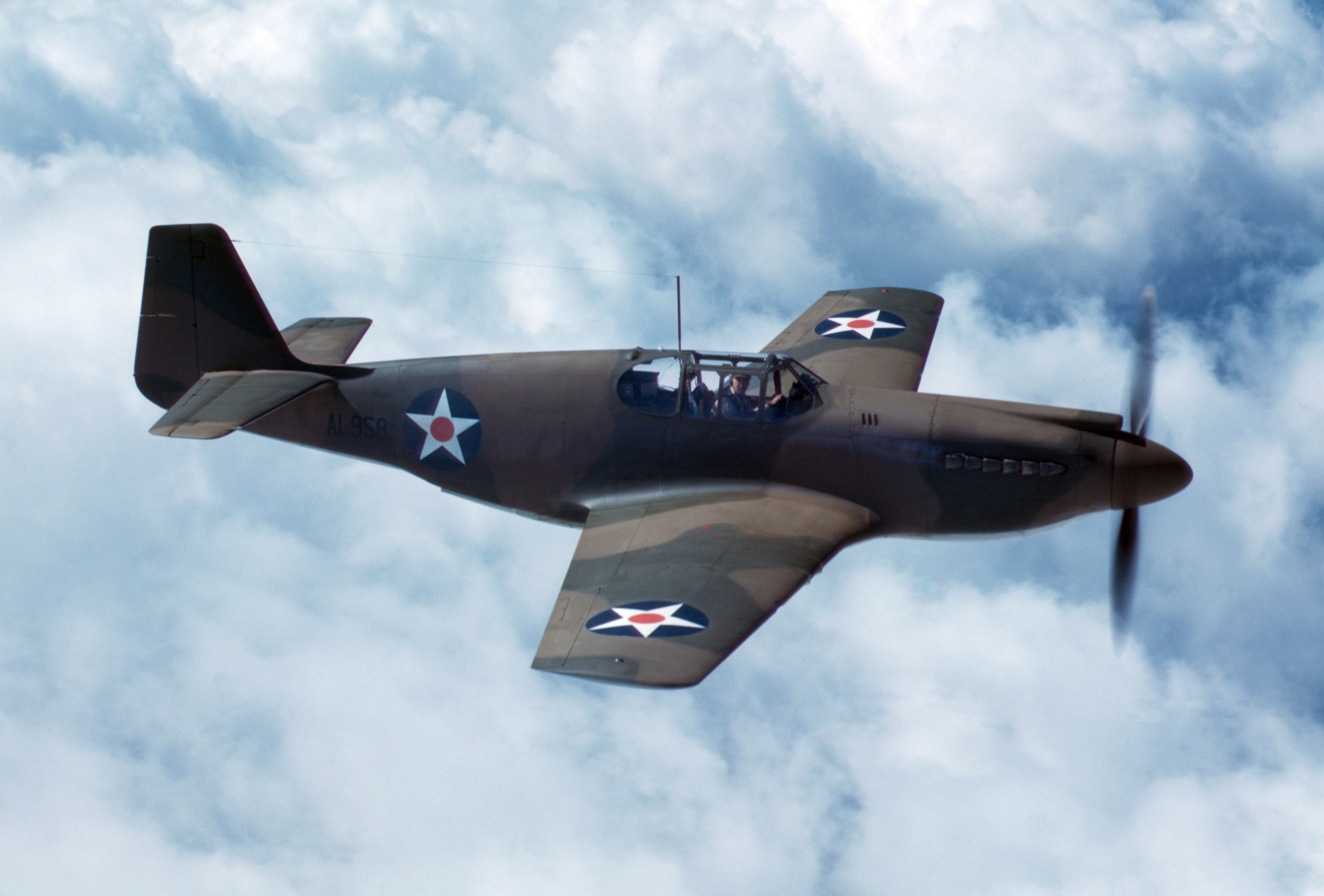
A Mustang Mk I in British camouflage and American markings on a test flight from the Inglewood, California factory in October 1942.

The first production contract was awarded by the British for 320 NA-73 fighters, named Mustang Mk I by the British Purchasing Commission; a second British contract soon followed, which called for 300 more (NA-83) Mustang Mk I fighters. Contractual arrangements were also made for two aircraft from the first order to be delivered to the USAAC for evaluation; these two airframes, 41-038 and 41-039 respectively, were designated XP-51. The first RAF Mustang Mk Is were delivered to 26 Squadron at RAF Gatwick in February 1942 and made their combat debut on 10 May 1942. With their long range and excellent low-altitude performance, they were employed effectively for tactical reconnaissance and ground-attack duties over the English Channel, but were thought to be of limited value as fighters due to their poor performance above 15,000 ft (4,600 m).

RAF Mustangs (Mk Is, which were not drop tank capable) made history on October 22, 1942, when they escorted 22 Vickers Wellington medium bombers on a daylight raid to Germany, thus becoming the first RAF single-seat fighters to fly over the country during World War II.

=== P-51/Mustang Mk IA (NA-91) ===
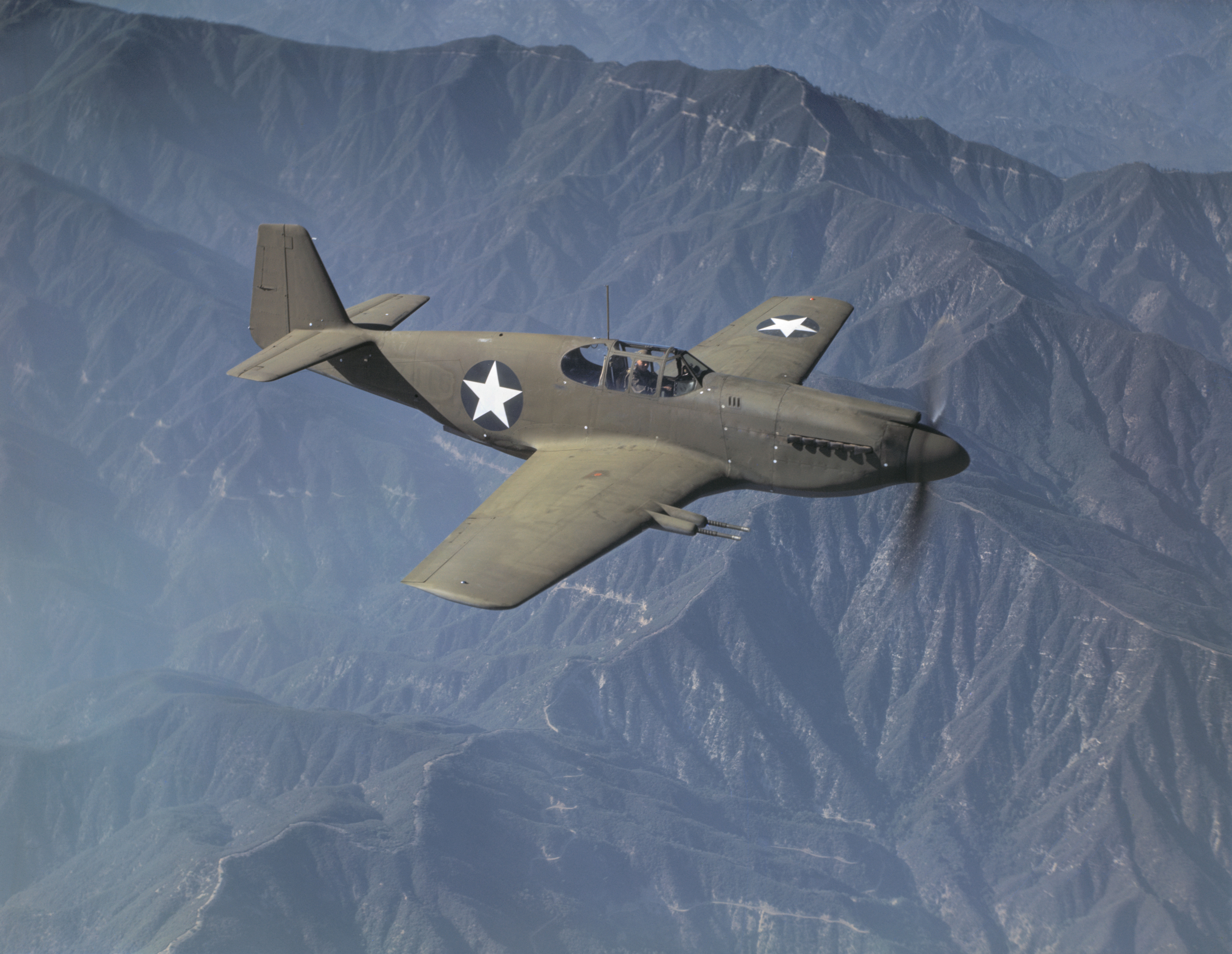
A North American Mustang Mk IA on a test flight from NAA's Inglewood facility in October 1942. The painted-over serial number appears to be 41-37416.

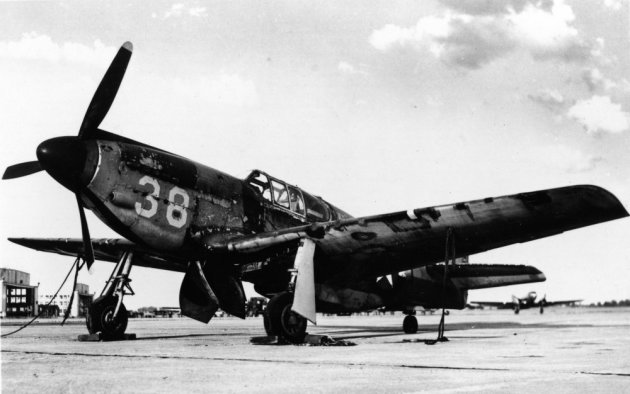
North American XP-51

The first American order for 150 P-51s, designated NA-91 by North American, was placed by the US Army on 7 July 1940. This was on behalf of the RAF in a Lend-Lease deal. All but the last 57 went to the British. After the attack on Pearl Harbor, the USAAF 'held back' these Mustang Mk IAs for their own use. Fifty-five of these P-51-1s were outfitted with a pair of K.24 cameras in the rear fuselage for tactical low-level reconnaissance and re-designated F-6A (the "F" for photographic, although confusingly also still referred to as the P-51 or P-51-1). Two kept their P-51-1 designation and were used for testing by the USAAF.

Two XP-51s (serials 41-038 and 41-039) set aside for testing arrived at Wright Field on 24 August and 16 December 1941 respectively. (Note: The Wright Field Flight reports are indexed in the External Links, P-51 (Allison Engine).) The small size of this first order reflected the fact that what had been known as the USAAC up until late June 1941 was still a relatively small, underfunded peacetime organization. After the late-June 1941 reorganization of the USAAC into the United States Army Air Forces, roughly six months before the attack on Pearl Harbor changed the outlook for the United States regarding involvement in global hostilities against the Axis overnight, priority had to be given to building as many existing fighters – P-38s, P-39s, and P-40s – as possible while simultaneously training pilots and other personnel, which meant evaluation of the XP-51 did not begin immediately. However, this did not mean it was neglected, or testing and evaluation mishandled.

The 150 NA-91s were designated P-51 by the newly formed USAAF and were initially named Apache, although this was soon dropped and the RAF name, Mustang, adopted instead. The USAAF did not like the mixed armament of the British Mustang Is and instead adopted an armament of four long-barrelled 20 mm (.79 in) Hispano Mk II cannon, removing the .50 cal (12.7 mm) "nostril"-mounted weapons. The British designated this model as Mustang Mk IA, and would fit a number with similar equipment.

It was quickly evident the Mustang's performance, although exceptional up to 15,000 ft (4,600 m) (the supercharger's critical altitude rating), was markedly reduced at higher altitudes. This was because the single-speed single-stage supercharger fitted to the V-1710 had been designed to produce maximum power at low altitude; above that, power dropped off rapidly. Prior to the Mustang project, the USAAC had Allison concentrate primarily on turbochargers in concert with General Electric; the turbochargers proved to be reliable and capable of providing significant power increases in the Lockheed P-38 Lightning and other high-altitude aircraft, in particular in the Air Corps' four-engine bombers. Most of the other uses for the Allison were for low-altitude designs, where a simpler supercharger would suffice. Fitting a turbocharger into the Mustang proved impractical, and Allison was forced to use the only supercharger available. In spite of this, the Mustang's advanced aerodynamics showed to advantage, as the Mk I was about 30 mph (48 km/h) faster than contemporary Curtiss P-40 Warhawks using the same V-1710-39 (producing 1,220 hp (910 kW; 1,240 PS) at 10,500 ft (3,200 m), driving a 10 ft 6 in (3.20 m) diameter, three-blade Curtiss-Electric propeller). The Mk I was 30 mph (48 km/h) faster than the Supermarine Spitfire Mk Vc at 5,000 ft (1,500 m) and 35 mph (56 km/h) faster at 15,000 ft (4,600 m), despite the British aircraft's more powerful engine (the Rolls-Royce Merlin 45, producing 1,470 hp (1,100 kW; 1,490 PS) at 9,250 ft (2,820 m).

Although it has often been stated that the poor performance of the Allison engine above 15,000 ft (4,600 m) was a surprise and disappointment to the RAF and USAAF, this has to be regarded as a myth; aviation engineers of the time were fully capable of correctly assessing the performance of an aircraft's engine and supercharger. As evidence of this, in mid-1941, the 93rd and 102nd airframes from the NA-91 order were slated to be set aside and fitted and tested with Packard Merlin (the US-built version of the Merlin) engines, with each receiving the designation XP-51B.

=== P-51A/Mustang Mk II (NA-99) ===
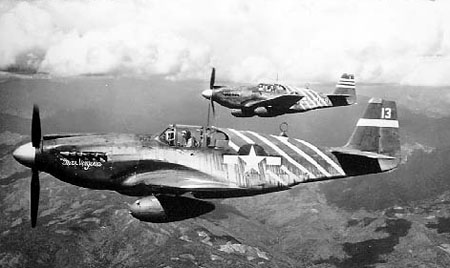
Two North American P-51A Mustangs

On 23 June 1942, a contract was placed for 1,200 P-51As (NA-99s). The P-51A used the new Allison V-1710-81 engine, a development of the V-1710-39, driving a 10 ft 9 in (3.28 m)-diameter three-bladed Curtiss-Electric propeller. The armament was changed to four .50 in (12.7 mm) Browning machine guns, two in each wing, with a maximum of 350 rounds per gun (rpg) for the inboard guns and 280 rpg for the outboard. Other improvements were made in parallel with the A-36, including an improved, fixed air duct inlet replacing the movable fitting of previous Mustang models and the fitting of wing racks able to carry either 75 or 150 US gal (62 or 125 imp gal; 280 or 570 L) drop tanks, increasing the maximum ferry range to 2,740 mi (4,410 km) with the 150 US gal (120 imp gal; 570 L) tanks. The top speed was raised to 409 mph (658 km/h) at 10,000 ft (3,000 m). The USAAF received 310 and the RAF 50 (as the Mustang II) before production converted to producing the Merlin-powered P-51B.

=== A-36A (NA-97) ===
The A-36A was the first aircraft based on the 'Mustang' airframe ordered by the U.S. Government specifically for use by the USAAF. NAA found an unfilled 'Dive Bomber' USAAF contract, which they got mainly by their own initiative. In so doing, NAA was able to keep the production bays open with the hope the USAAF would place orders for it as a fighter. On 16 April 1942, Fighter Project Officer Benjamin S. Kelsey ordered 500 A-36As, a redesign that included six .50 in (12.7 mm) M2 Browning machine guns, dive brakes, and the ability to carry two 500 lb (230 kg) bombs. Kelsey would rather have bought more fighters but was willing instead to initiate a higher level of Mustang production at North American by using USAAF funds earmarked for ground-attack aircraft when pursuit aircraft funding had already been allocated. It was the first airframe of the Mustang "family" to be drop-tank capable.

The 500 aircraft were designated A-36A (NA-97). This model became the first USAAF Mustang to see combat. One aircraft (British serial EW998) was passed to the British who gave it the name Mustang Mk I (Dive Bomber).

== Merlin-engined Mustangs ==
=== Mustang Mk X ===
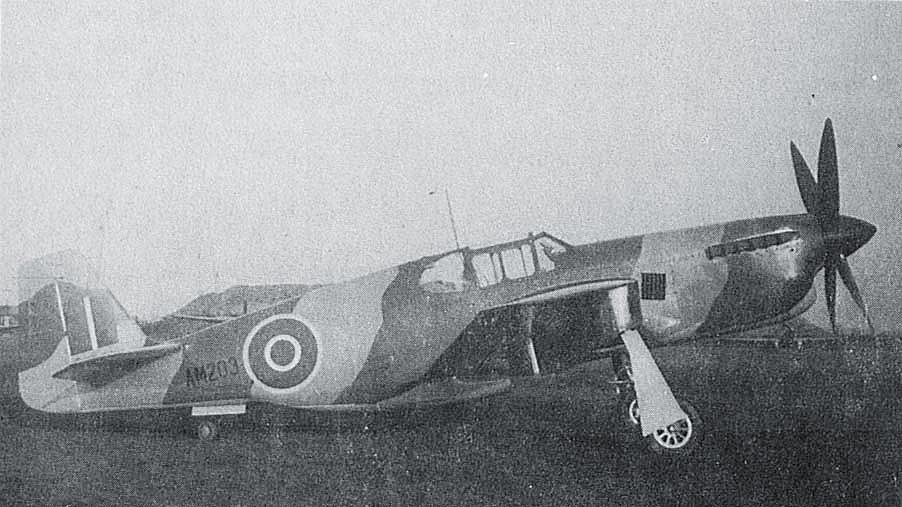
AM203, one of five Mustang Mk.Xs

In April 1942, the RAF's Air Fighting Development Unit (AFDU) tested the Mustang and found its performance inadequate at higher altitudes. As such, it was to be used to replace the P-40 in Army Cooperation Command squadrons, but the commanding officer was so impressed with its maneuverability and low-altitude speeds, he invited Ronnie Harker (from Rolls-Royce's Flight Test establishment) to fly it. Rolls-Royce engineers rapidly realized equipping the Mustang with a high altitude Merlin 61 engine with its two-speed two-stage supercharger would substantially improve performance. The company started converting five aircraft as the Mustang Mk X with the Merlin 65. Apart from the engine installation, which utilized custom-built engine mounts designed by Rolls-Royce and initially the 10 ft 9 in (3.28 m)-diameter four-bladed Rotol propeller from a Spitfire Mk IX, the Mk X was a straightforward adaptation of the Mk I airframe, keeping the same radiator duct design. The Vice-Chief of the Air Staff, Air Marshal Sir Wilfrid R. Freeman, lobbied vociferously for Merlin-powered Mustangs, insisting two of the five experimental Mustang Xs be handed over to Carl Spaatz for trials and evaluation by the U.S. Eighth Air Force in Britain. The high-altitude performance improvement was remarkable: one Mk X (serial number AM208) reached 433 mph (376 kn; 697 km/h) at 22,000 ft (6,700 m) with full supercharger, and AL975 tested at an absolute ceiling of 40,600 ft (12,400 m).

=== P-51B and P-51C ===
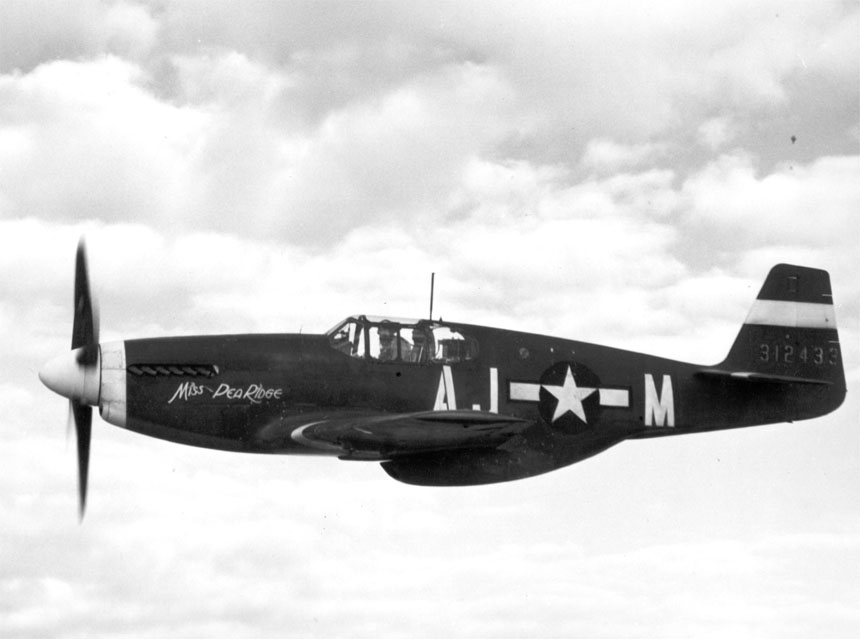
An early P-51B assigned to the 356th FS, 354th FG, Eighth Air Force in England.

The two XP-51Bs (Note: The provisional designation XP-78 was dropped after a formal decision had been taken to develop the new engine and airframe combination and to stop production of any further Allison-engined aircraft.) were a more thorough conversion than the Mustang X, with a tailor-made engine installation and a complete redesign of the radiator duct. The airframe itself was strengthened, with the fuselage and engine mount area receiving more formers because of the 355 lb (161 kg) greater weight of the Packard V-1650-3 compared with the V-1710. The engine cowling was completely redesigned to house the Packard Merlin, which, because of the intercooler radiator mounted on the supercharger casing, was 5 in (130 mm) taller and used an updraft carburetor, rather than the downdraft variety of the Allison. The new engine drove a four-bladed 11 ft 2 in (3.40 m)-diameter Hamilton Standard propeller that featured cuffs of hard molded rubber. To cater for the increased cooling requirements of the Merlin, a new fuselage duct was designed. This housed a larger radiator, which incorporated a section for the supercharger coolant, and, forward of this and slightly lower, an oil cooler was housed in a secondary duct which drew air through the main opening and exhausted via a separate exit flap.

A "duct rumble" heard by pilots in flight in the prototype P-51B resulted in a full-scale wind-tunnel test at NACA's Ames Aeronautical Laboratory. This was carried out by inserting the airplane, with the outer wing panels removed, into the 16-foot wind tunnel. A test engineer would sit in the cockpit with the wind tunnel running and listen for the duct rumble. It was eventually found that the rumble could be eliminated by increasing the gap between the lower surface of the wing and the upper lip of the cooling system duct from 1 to 2 in (25 to 51 mm). They concluded part of the boundary layer on the lower surface of the wing was being ingested into the inlet and separating, causing the radiator to vibrate and producing the rumble. The production P-51B inlet was lowered even further, to give a separation of 2.63 in (67 mm) from the bottom of the wing. In addition, the shelf above the oil cooler face was removed and the inlet highlight swept back.

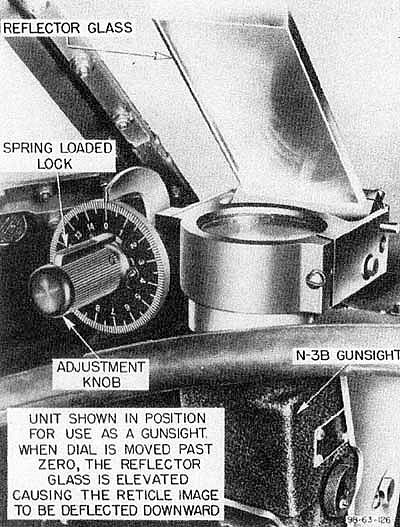
N3B reflector gunsight with A-1 head assembly.

It was decided new P-51Bs (NA-102s) would continue with the same armament and ammunition load of the P-51A, while the bomb rack/external drop tank installation was adapted from the A-36 Apache; the racks were rated to carry up to 500 lb (230 kg) of ordnance and were also piped for drop tanks. The machine guns were aimed using the electrically illuminated N-3B reflector sight fitted with an A-1 head assembly which allowed it to be used as a gun or bomb sight through varying the angle of the reflector glass. Pilots were also given the option of having ring and bead sights mounted on the top engine cowling formers. This option was discontinued with the P-51D.

The first XP-51B flew on 30 November 1942. Flight tests confirmed the potential of the new fighter, with the service ceiling being raised by 10,000 ft (3,000 m), with the top speed improving by 50 mph (43 kn; 80 km/h) at 30,000 ft (9,100 m). American production was started in early 1943 with the P-51B (NA-102) being manufactured at Inglewood, California, and the P-51C (NA-103) at a new plant in Dallas, Texas, which was in operation by summer 1943. (Note: The Inglewood manufactured Bs were given the suffix NA (e.g. P-51B-5-NA) while the Dallas manufactured P-51Cs were given the suffix NT (e.g. P-51C-10-NT). P-51Ds used the same NA suffix while the equivalent P-51Ks used the suffix NT.) The RAF named these models Mustang Mk III. In performance tests, the P-51B reached 441 mph (383 kn; 710 km/h) at 30,000 ft (9,100 m). In addition, the extended range made possible by the use of drop tanks enabled the Merlin-powered Mustang to be introduced as a bomber escort with a combat radius of 750 mi (1,210 km) using two 75 US gal (62 imp gal; 280 L) 2-piece, sheet-metal stamped construction drop tanks.

The range would be further increased with the introduction of an 85 US gal (71 imp gal; 320 L) self-sealing fuel tank aft of the pilot's seat, starting with P-51B-5-NA ("block 5"). When this tank was full, the center of gravity of the Mustang was moved dangerously close to the aft limit. As a result, maneuvers were restricted until the tank was down to about 25 US gal (21 imp gal; 95 L) and the external tanks had been dropped. Problems with high-speed "porpoising" of the P-51Bs and P-51Cs with the fuselage tanks would lead to the replacement of the fabric-covered elevators with metal-covered surfaces and a reduction of the tailplane incidence. With the fuselage and wing tanks, plus two 75 US gal (62 imp gal; 280 L) drop tanks, the combat radius was 880 mi (1,420 km).

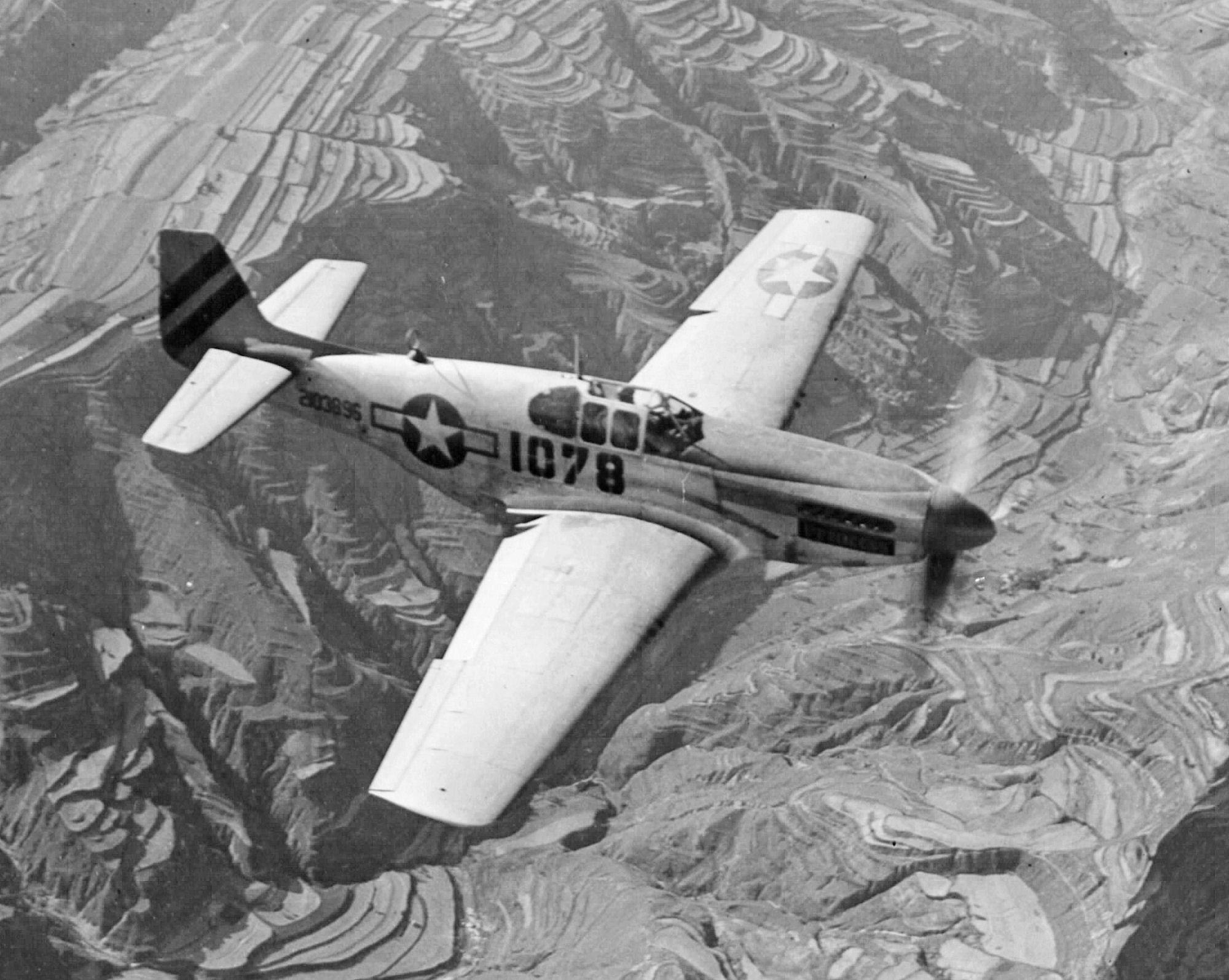
P-51C of 311 FG, China, July 1945, shows the rarely fitted dorsal fin fillet (before the P-51D's introduction), meant to help counter control problems experienced when the fuselage fuel tank was fitted.

Despite these modifications, the P-51Bs and P-51Cs, and the newer P-51Ds and P-51Ks, experienced low-speed handling problems that could result in an involuntary "snap-roll" under certain conditions of air speed, angle of attack, gross weight, and center of gravity. Several crash reports tell of P-51Bs and P-51Cs crashing because horizontal stabilizers were torn off during maneuvering. As a result of these problems, a modification kit consisting of a dorsal fin was manufactured. One report stated: "Unless a dorsal fin is installed on the P-51B, P-51C and P-51D airplanes, a snap roll may result when attempting a slow roll. The horizontal stabilizer will not withstand the effects of a snap roll. To prevent recurrence, the stabilizer should be reinforced in accordance with T.O. 01-60J-18 dated 8 April 1944 and a dorsal fin should be installed. Dorsal fin kits are being made available to overseas activities"

The dorsal fin kits became available in August 1944, and available as retrofits for P-51Bs and P-51Cs (but rarely used on the "razorback" -B and -C Mustangs), and to early P-51Ds and P-51Ks that had not already been built with them. Also incorporated was a change to the rudder trim tabs, which would help prevent the pilot over-controlling the aircraft and creating heavy loads on the tail unit.

One of the few remaining complaints with the Merlin-powered aircraft was a poor rearward view. The canopy structure, which was the same as the Allison-engined Mustangs, was made up of flat, framed panels; the pilot entered or exited the cockpit by lowering the port side panel and raising the top panel to the right. The canopy could not be opened in flight and tall pilots especially were hampered by limited headroom. In order to at least partially improve the view from the Mustang, the British had field-modified some Mustangs with clear, sliding canopies called Malcolm hoods (designed by R Malcolm & Co), and whose design had also been adopted by the U.S. Navy's own F4U-1D version of the Vought F4U Corsair in April 1944.

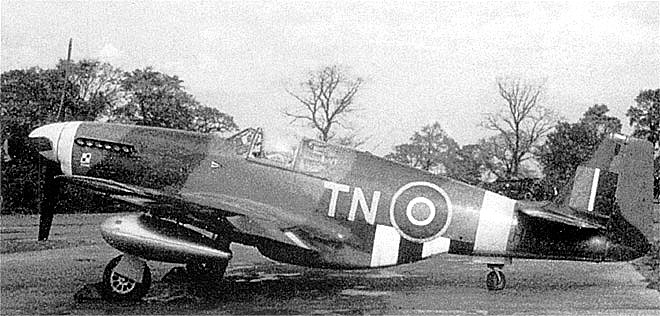
A Malcolm Hood-equipped Mustang Mk III flown by Wing Commander Tadeusz Nowierski, CO of 133 (Polish) Wing, RAF Coolham, July 1944.

The new structure was a frameless plexiglas moulding (Note: The only proper frames housed the runners at the base; because the fore and aft frames were perspex the canopy was able to break apart should it strike the tail on jettisoning.) which ballooned outwards at the top and sides, increasing the headroom and allowing increased visibility to the sides and rear. Because the new structure slid backward on runners, it could be slid open in flight. The aerial mast behind the canopy was replaced by a "whip" aerial which was mounted further aft and offset to the right. Most British Mk IIIs were equipped with Malcolm hoods. Several American service groups "acquired" the necessary conversion kits and some American P-51B/P-51Cs appeared with the new canopy, although the majority continued to use the original framed canopies.

P-51Bs and P-51Cs started to arrive in England in August and October 1943. The P-51B/P-51C versions were sent to 15 fighter groups that were part of the Eighth and Ninth Air Forces in England and the Twelfth and Fifteenth in Italy (the southern part of Italy was under Allied control by late 1943). Other deployments included the China Burma India Theater (CBI). The first group to fly the P-51 on operations was the 354th Operations Group; their first long-distance escort mission was flown on January 15, 1944.

Allied strategists quickly exploited the long-range fighter as a bomber escort. It was largely due to the P-51 that daylight bombing raids deep into German territory became possible without prohibitive bomber losses in late 1943.

A number of the P-51B and P-51C aircraft were fitted for photo reconnaissance and designated F-6C.

=== P-51D and P-51K ===
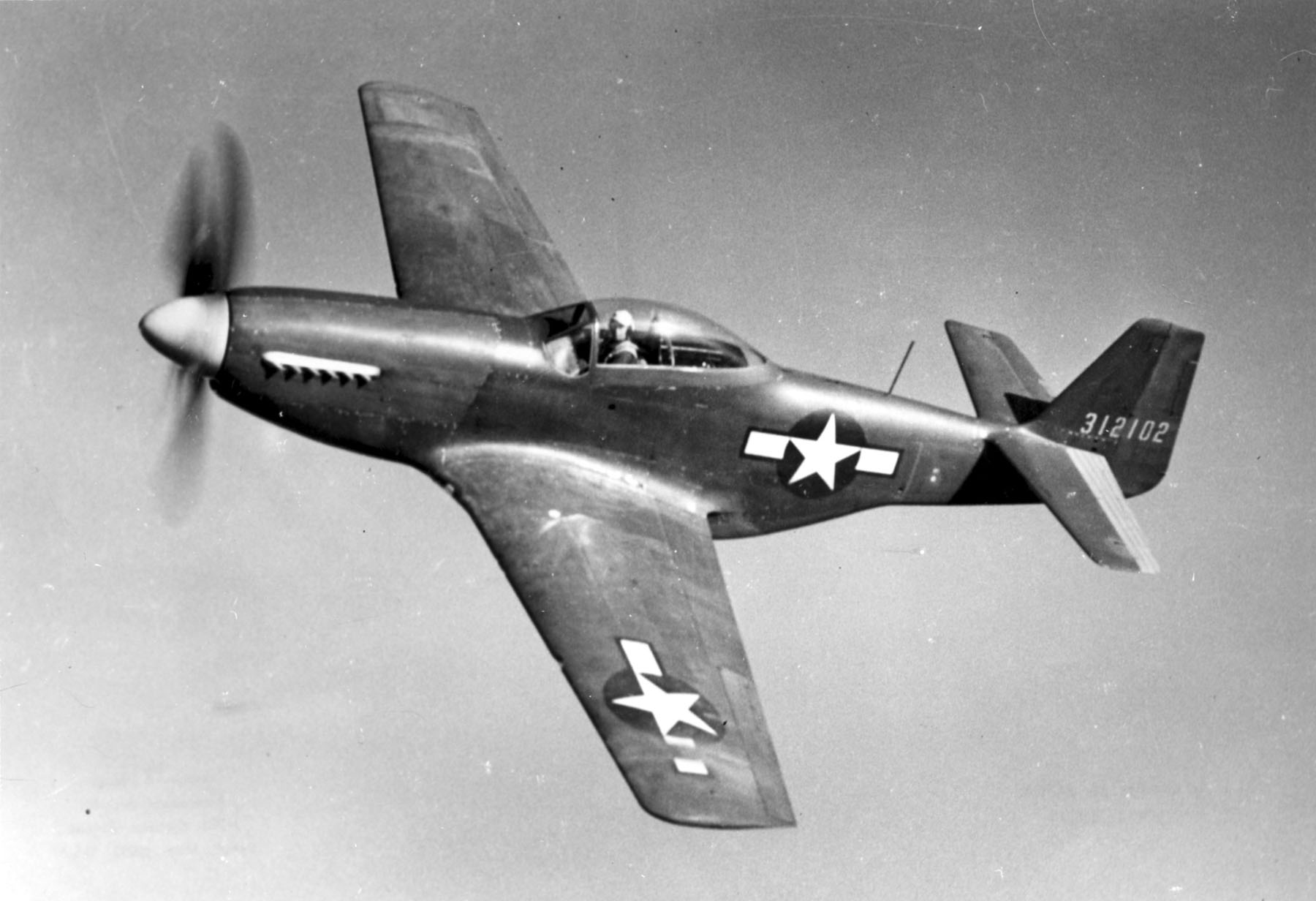
The tenth production P-51B, 43–12102, prototype for the P-51D, showing the modified rear fuselage and new canopy and windscreen

Following combat experience the P-51D series introduced a "teardrop", or "bubble", canopy to rectify problems with poor visibility to the rear of the aircraft. In the United States, new moulding techniques had been developed to form streamlined nose transparencies for bombers. North American designed a new streamlined plexiglass canopy for the P-51B which was later developed into the teardrop shaped bubble canopy. In late 1942, the tenth production P-51B-1-NA was removed from the assembly lines. From the windshield aft the fuselage was redesigned by cutting down the rear fuselage formers to the same height as those forward of the cockpit; the new shape faired in to the vertical tail unit. A new simpler style of windscreen, with an angled bullet-resistant windscreen mounted on two flat side pieces improved the forward view while the new canopy resulted in exceptional all-round visibility. Wind tunnel tests of a wooden model confirmed that the aerodynamics were sound.

The new model Mustang also had a redesigned wing; alterations to the undercarriage up-locks and inner-door retracting mechanisms meant that there was an additional fillet added forward of each of the wheel bays, increasing the wing area and creating a distinctive "kink" at the wing root's leading edges.

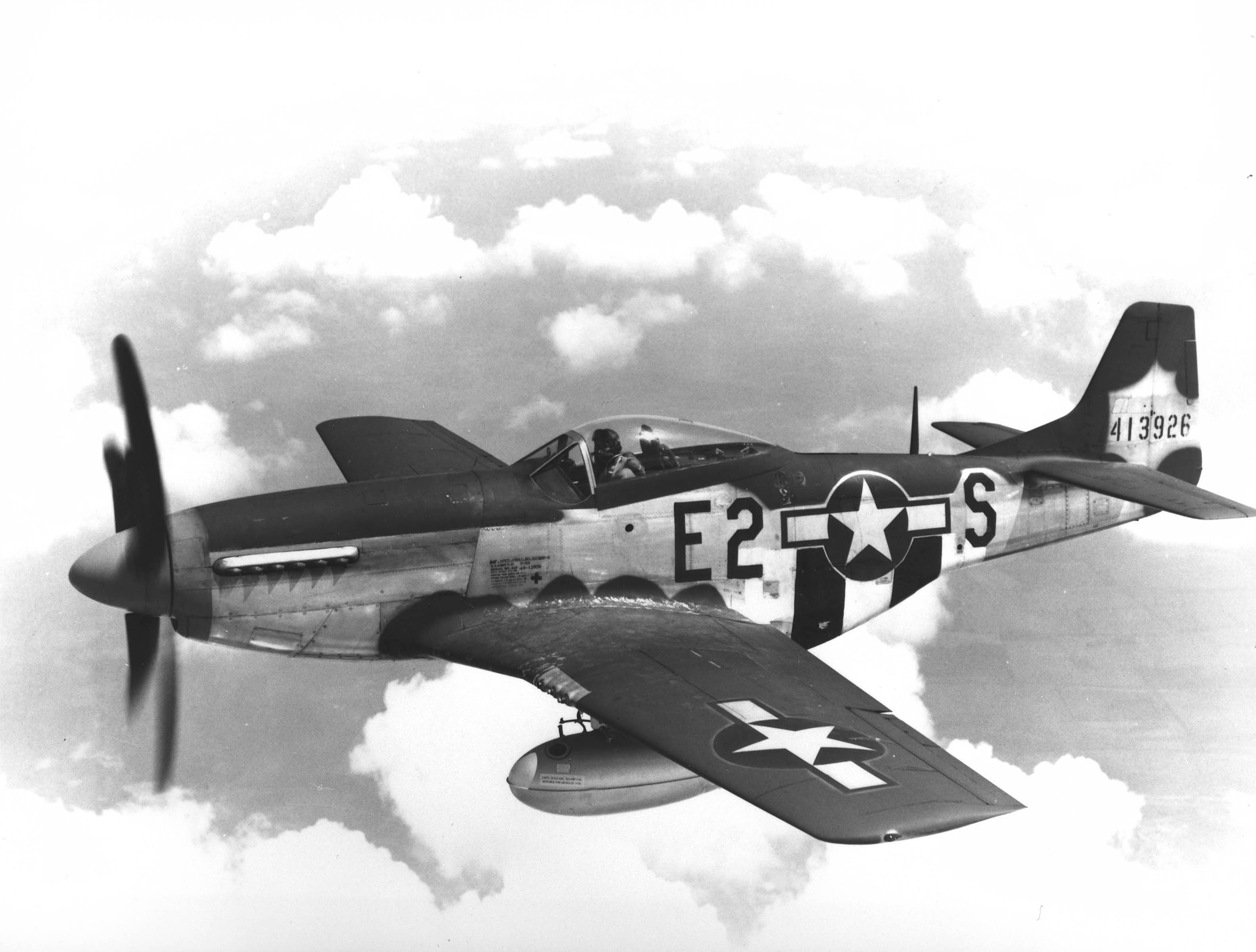
P-51D-5-NA, assigned to Lieutenant Abe P. Rosenberger. (Note: This Mustang can also be seen in the heading photo of the 375th FS, 361st FG.) with the "kinked" wing root leading edge and the added fin fillet on the tail present. This aircraft is famous in photos as one of "The Bottisham Four."

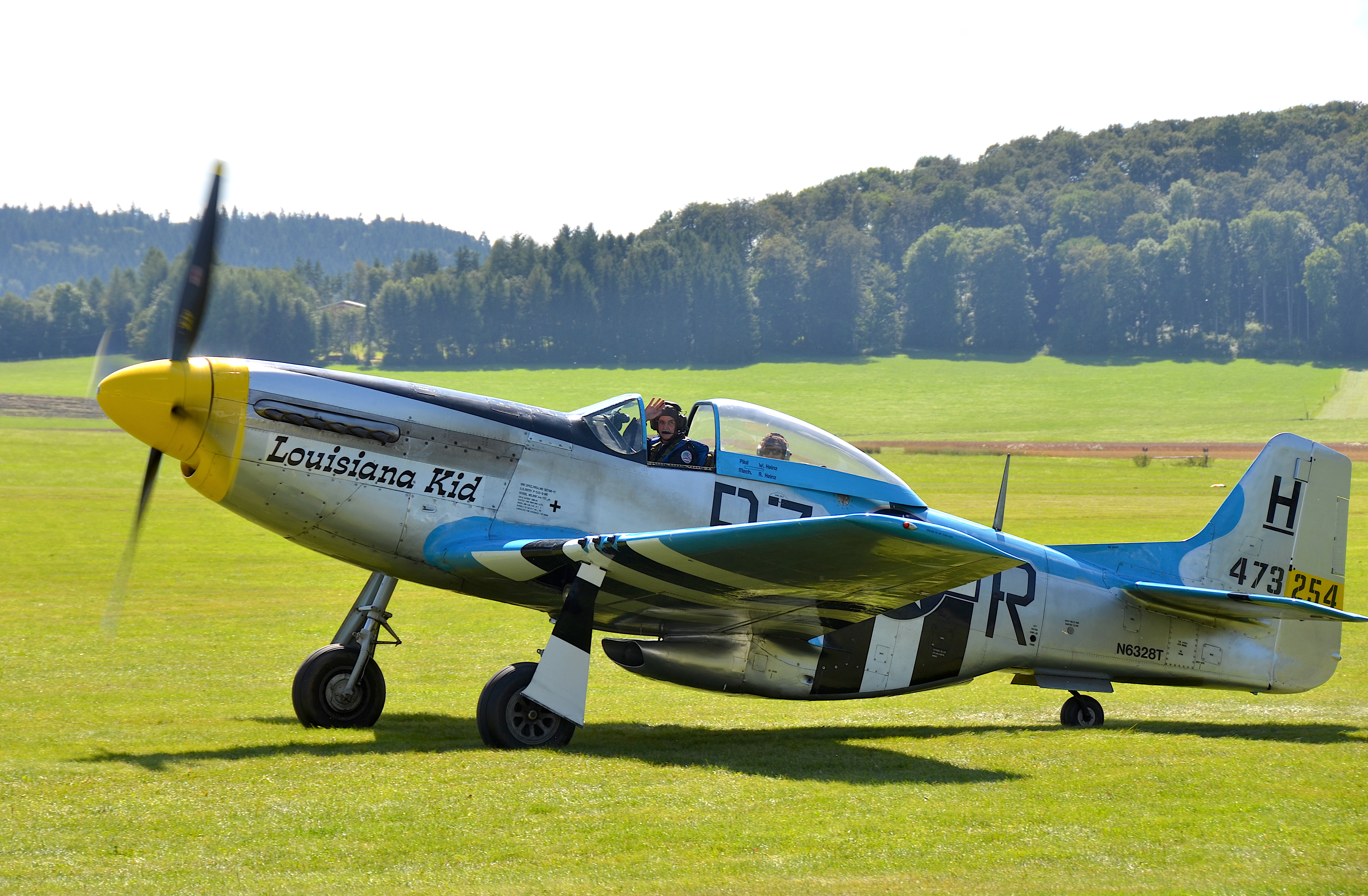
North American P-51D-25-NA Mustang, Louisiana Kid at Degerfeld airfield (2016)

Other alterations to the wings included new navigation lights, mounted on the wingtips, rather than the smaller lights above and below the wings of the earlier Mustangs, and retractable landing lights which were mounted at the back of the wheel wells; these replaced the lights which had been formerly mounted in the wing leading edges.

The engine was the Packard V-1650-7, a licence-built version of the Rolls-Royce Merlin 60 series, fitted with a two-stage, two-speed supercharger.

The armament was increased with the addition of two more .50 in (12.7 mm) AN/M2 "light-barrel" M2 Browning machine guns, the standard heavy machine gun used throughout the American air services of World War II, bringing the total to six. The inner pair of machine guns had 400 rounds per gun, and the others had 270 rpg, for a total of 1,880. The B/C subtypes' M2 guns were mounted with an inboard axial tilt, this angled mounting had caused problems with the ammunition feed and with spent casings and links failing to clear the gun-chutes, leading to frequent complaints that the guns jammed during combat maneuvers. The D/K's six M2s were mounted upright, remedying the jamming problems. In addition, the weapons were installed along the line of the wing's dihedral, rather than parallel to the ground line as in the earlier Mustangs. (Note: The M2, although not firing an explosive projectile, had excellent ballistics and proved adequate against the Focke-Wulf Fw 190A and Messerschmitt Bf 109G fighters, which were the main USAAF opponents at the time.)

The wing racks fitted to the P-51D/P-51K series were strengthened and were able to carry up to 1,000 lb (450 kg) of ordnance, although 500 lb (230 kg) bombs were the recommended maximum load. Later models had removable under-wing 'Zero Rail' rocket pylons added to carry up to ten T64 5.0 in (127 mm) HVAR rockets per plane. The gunsight was changed from the N-3B to the N-9 before the introduction in September 1944 of the K-14 or K-14A gyro-computing sight. (Note: The K-14A had range lines for the T64 rockets etched onto the sight reticle.) Apart from these changes, the P-51D and K series retained V-1650-7 engine used in the majority of the P-51B/C series.

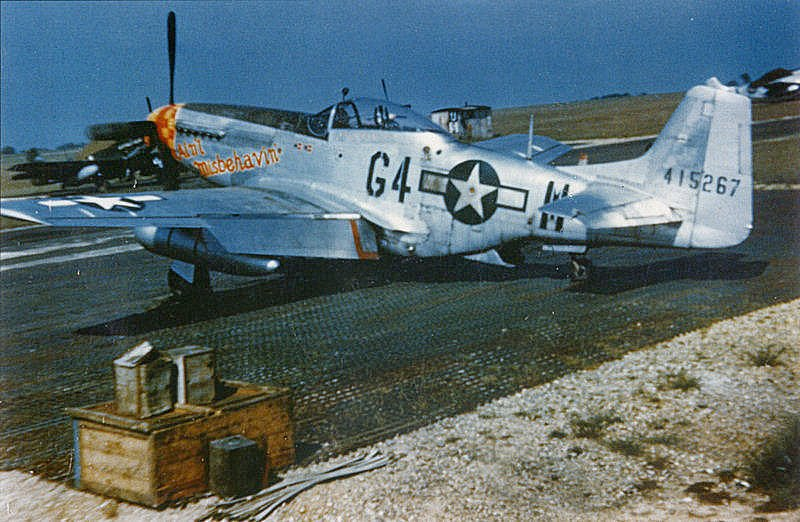
P-51K 44-15672 (Lt. Jessie R. Frey of the 362nd FS, 357th FG) shows the Aeroproducts propeller unit with the "uncuffed" blades and integral fin fillet on the tail (Note: An AN/APS-13 antenna array can just be seen on the vertical fin and there is an orange formation light in the center of the fuselage star.)

The addition of the 85 US gallon (322 l) fuselage fuel tank, coupled with the reduction in area of the new rear fuselage, exacerbated the handling problems already experienced with the B/C series when fitted with the tank, and led to the same fillet being added to -B, -C and initial -D-series versions in the field, to be quickly standardized as a normal rear-fuselage airframe component on later production blocks of the -D version. P-51Ds without fuselage fuel tanks were fitted with either the SCR-522-A or SCR-274-N Command Radio sets and SCR-695-A, or SCR-515 radio transmitters, as well as an AN/APS-13 rear-warning set; (Note: Command radio equipment was used to communicate with other aircraft or ground stations, while R/T was used between aircraft only. The AN/APS-13 was fitted to late series aircraft and used four small antenna mounted horizontally on the vertical tail fin.) P-51Ds and Ks with fuselage tanks used the SCR-522-A and AN/APS-13 only.

The P-51D became the most widely produced variant of the Mustang. A Dallas-built version of the P-51D, designated the P-51K, was equipped with an 11 ft (3.4 m) diameter Aeroproducts propeller in place of the 11.2 ft (3.4 m) Hamilton Standard propeller. The hollow-bladed Aeroproducts propeller was unreliable, due to manufacturing problems, with dangerous vibrations at full throttle and was eventually replaced by the Hamilton Standard. By the time of the Korean War, most F-51s were equipped with "uncuffed" Hamilton Standard propellers with wider, blunt-tipped blades.

The photo reconnaissance versions of the P-51D and P-51K were designated F-6D and F-6K respectively. The RAF assigned the name Mustang Mk IV to the P-51D model and Mustang Mk IVA to P-51K models.

The P-51D/P-51K started arriving in Europe in mid-1944 and quickly became the primary USAAF fighter in the theater. It was produced in larger numbers than any other Mustang variant. Nevertheless, by the end of the war, roughly half of all operational Mustangs were still P-51B or P-51C models.

=== Australian production ===
In November 1944 the Australian government decided to order Australian-built Mustangs, to replace its Curtiss Kittyhawks and CAC Boomerangs in the South West Pacific theatre. The Commonwealth Aircraft Corporation (CAC) factory at Fishermans Bend, Melbourne was the only non-U.S. production line for the P-51.

In 1944, 100 P-51Ds were shipped from the U.S. in kit form to inaugurate production. From February 1945, CAC assembled 80 of these under the designation CA-17 Mustang Mark 20, with the first Australian-built aircraft flying on the 29 April 1945 and the first aircraft was handed over to the RAAF on 31 May 1945. The remaining 20 were kept unassembled as spare parts. In addition, 84 P-51Ks were also shipped directly to the RAAF from the USA.

In late 1946, CAC was given another contract to build 170 (reduced to 120) more P-51Ds on its own; these, designated CA-18 Mustang Mark 21, Mark 22 or Mark 23, were manufactured entirely in-house, with only a few components being sourced from overseas. The 21 and 22 used the American-built Packard V-1650-3 or V-1650-7. The Mark 23s, (Note: The prototype of the Mark 23, A68-1001, ex 44-13293, was used as a development aircraft by CAC prior to assembling the CA-17s and was re-engined with a Rolls-Royce Merlin 70 to assess the suitability of the British built engine.) which followed the 21s, were powered by Rolls-Royce Merlin 66 or Merlin 70 engines. The first 26 were built as Mark 21s, followed by 66 Mark 23s; the first 14 Mark 21s were converted to fighter-reconnaissance aircraft, with two F24 cameras in both vertical and oblique positions in the rear fuselage, above and behind the radiator fairing; the designation of these modified Mustangs was changed from Mark 21 to Mark 22. An additional 14 purpose-built Mark 22s, built after the Mark 23s, and powered by either Packard V-1650-7s or Merlin 68s, completed the production run. All of the CA-17s and CA-18s, plus the 84 P-51Ks, used Australian serial numbers prefixed by A68.

In October 1953, six Mustangs, including A68-1, the first Australian built CA-17 Mk 20, were allotted to the Long Range Weapons Development Establishment at Maralinga, South Australia, for use in experiments to gauge the effects of low-yield atomic bombs. The Mustangs were placed on a dummy airfield about 0.62 mi (1 km) from the blast tower on which two low-yield bombs were detonated. The Mustangs survived intact. In 1967, A68-1 was bought by a U.S. syndicate, for restoration to flight status and is currently owned by Troy Sanders.

After the USAF cancelled orders for P-51H variants, the RAAF followed suit, stopping 250 locally built CAC CA-21s.

== The "lightweight" Mustangs ==
=== XP-51F, XP-51G and XP-51J ===
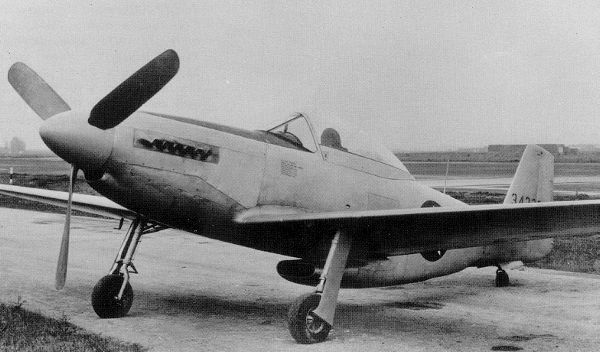
North American XP-51F

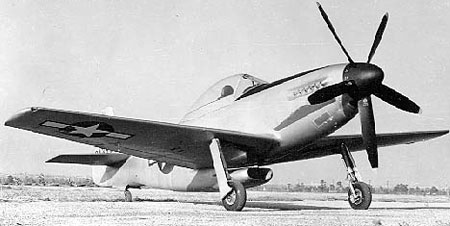
North American XP-51G

The lightweight Mustangs had a new wing design. The airfoil was switched to the NACA 66,2-(1.8)15.5 a=.6 at the root and the NACA 66,2-(1.8)12 a=.6 at the tip. These airfoils were designed to give less drag than the previous NAA/NACA 45-100. In addition, the planform was a simple trapezoid, with no leading edge extension at the root.

In 1943, North American submitted a proposal to redesign the P-51D as model NA-105, which was accepted by the USAAF. Modifications included changes to the cowling, a simplified undercarriage with smaller wheels and disc brakes, a larger canopy, and an armament of four .50 Brownings. In total the design was some 1,600 lb (730 kg) lighter than the P-51D. Schmued described how it came from an enquiry by the USAAF as to why British aircraft were lighter than American ones. NAA engineers examined the various components and equipment fitted to Spitfires. In the course of this NAA found that British load factors were less than American ones. Working to the lower load factors helped them reduce structure weight. In test flights, the NA-105 achieved 491 mph (790 km/h) at 21,000 ft (6,400 m). The designation XP-51F was assigned to prototypes powered with V-1650 engines (a small number were passed to the British as the Mustang V), and XP-51G to those with Merlin RM 14 SMs.

A third lightweight prototype powered by an Allison V-1710-119 was added to the development program. This aircraft was designated XP-51J. Since the engine was insufficiently developed, the XP-51J was loaned to Allison for engine development. None of these experimental lightweights went into production.

=== P-51H ===
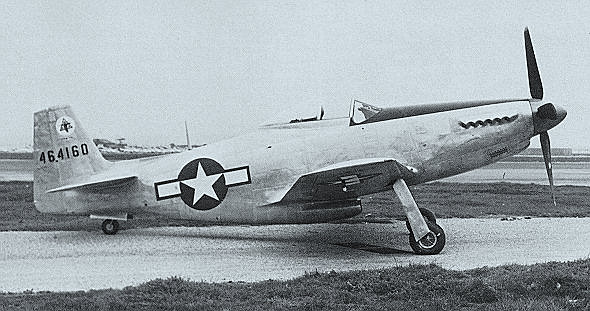
A North American P-51H-10-NA showing the longer, slightly deeper fuselage and the lightweight undercarriage with smaller wheels. A taller tailfin was later adopted by the P-51H series.

The P-51H (NA-126) was the final production Mustang, embodying the experience gained in the development of the XP-51F and XP-51G aircraft. This aircraft, with minor differences as the NA-129, came too late to participate in World War II, but it brought the development of the Mustang to a peak as one of the fastest production piston-engine fighters to see service.

The P-51H used the new V-1650-9 engine, a version of the Merlin that included Simmons automatic supercharger boost control with water injection, allowing War Emergency Power as high as 2,218 hp (1,500 kW). Differences between the P-51D included lengthening the fuselage and increasing the height of the tailfin, which reduced the tendency to yaw. Service access to the guns and ammunition was also improved. The canopy resembled the P-51D "bubble" style, over a raised pilot's position, and the aircraft was given a new propeller with wider, uncuffed blades and rounded tips to allow the additional power to be better used. This propeller was similar to the one used on some later production P-51Ds and the majority of postwar F-51Ds.

With a new airframe several hundred pounds lighter, extra power, and a more streamlined radiator, the P-51H was faster than the P-51D, able to reach 410 kn (470 mph; 760 km/h) at 22,700 ft (6,900 m).

The P-51H was designed to complement the Republic P-47N Thunderbolt as the primary aircraft for the planned invasion of Japan, with 2,000 ordered to be manufactured at Inglewood. Production was just gathering steam with 555 delivered when the war ended. Additional orders, already on the books, were canceled. With the cutback in production, the variants of the P-51H with different versions of the Merlin engine were produced in either limited numbers or terminated. These included the P-51L, similar to the P-51H but utilizing the 2,270 hp (1,690 kW) V-1650-11 engine, which was never built; and its Dallas-built version, the P-51M, or NA-124, which used the V-1650-9A engine lacking water injection and therefore rated for lower maximum power, of which one was built out of the original 1629 ordered, serial number 45-11743.

Although some P-51Hs were issued to operational units, none saw combat in World War II and, in postwar service, most were issued to reserve units. One aircraft was provided to the RAF for testing and evaluation. Serial number 44-64192 was designated BuNo 09064 and used by the U.S. Navy to test transonic airfoil designs and then returned to the Air National Guard in 1952. The P-51H was not used for combat in the Korean War despite its improved handling characteristics, since the P-51D was available in much larger numbers and was a proven commodity.

Many of the aerodynamic advances of the P-51 (including the laminar flow wing) were carried over to North American's next generation of jet-powered fighters, the Navy FJ-1 Fury and Air Force F-86 Sabre. The wings, empennage and canopy of the first straight-winged variant of the Fury (the FJ-1) and the unbuilt preliminary prototypes of the P-86/F-86 strongly resembled those of the Mustang before the aircraft were modified with swept-wing designs.

== Experimental Mustangs ==
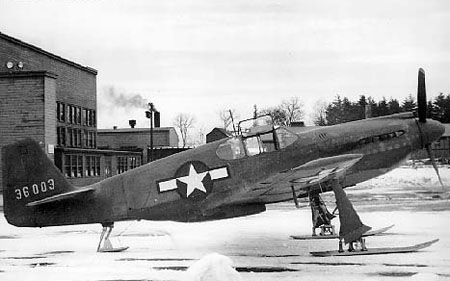
The P-51A-1-NA modified with skis

In early 1944, the first P-51A-1-NA, 43-6003. was fitted and tested with a lightweight retractable ski kit replacing the wheels. This conversion was made in response to a perceived requirement for aircraft that would operate away from prepared airstrips. The main oleo leg fairings were retained, but the main wheel doors and tail wheel doors were removed for the tests. When the undercarriage was retracted, the main gear skis were housed in the space in the lower engine compartment made available by the removal of the fuselage .50 in (12.7 mm) Brownings from the P-51As. The entire installation added 390 lb (180 kg) to the aircraft weight and required that the operating pressure of the hydraulic system had to be increased from 1,000 to 1,200 psi (6,900 to 8,300 kPa)). Flight tests showed ground handling was good, and the Mustang could take off and land in a field length of 1,000 ft (300 m); the maximum speed was 18 mph (29 km/h) lower, although it was thought that fairings over the retracted skis would compensate.

Concern over the USAAF's inability to escort Boeing B-29 Superfortresses all the way to mainland Japan resulted in the highly classified "Seahorse" project (NAA-133), an effort to "navalize" the P-51. (Note: Although tests were conducted on a P-51D, the intent of NA-133 was to develop a naval version of the P-51H.) On 15 November 1944, naval aviator (and later test pilot) Lieutenant Bob Elder, in a P-51D-5-NA 44-14017, started flight tests from the deck of the carrier Shangri-La. This Mustang had been fitted with an arrestor hook, which was attached to a reinforced bulkhead behind the tail wheel opening; the hook was housed in a streamlined position under the rudder fairing and could be released from the cockpit. The tests showed that the Mustang could be flown off the carrier deck without the aid of a catapult, using a flap setting of 20° down and 5° of up elevator. Landings were found to be easy, and, by allowing the tail wheel to contact the deck before the main gear, the aircraft could be stopped in a minimum distance. The project was canceled after U.S. Marines secured the Japanese island of Iwo Jima and its airfields, making it possible for standard P-51D models to accompany B-29s all the way to the Japanese home islands and back.

While North American was concentrating on improving the performance of the P-51 through the development of the lightweight Mustangs, in Britain, other avenues of development were being pursued. To this end, two Mustang Mk IIIs (P-51Bs and P-51Cs), FX858 and FX901, were fitted with different Merlin engine variants. The first of these, FX858, was fitted with a Merlin 100 by Rolls-Royce at Hucknall; this engine was similar to the RM 14 SM fitted to the XP-51G and was capable of generating 2,080 hp (1,550 kW) at 22,800 ft (7,000 m) using a boost pressure of +25 lbf/in^{2} (170 kPa; 80 inHg) in war emergency setting. With this engine, FX858 reached a maximum speed of 455 mph (732 km/h) at 17,800 ft (5,425 m), and 451 mph could be maintained to 25,000 ft (7,600 m). The climb rate was 4,500 ft/min (22.9 m/s) at 1,600 ft (486 m) and 4,000 ft/min (20.3 m/s) at 13,000 ft (3,962 m).

FX901 was fitted with a Merlin 113 (also used in the de Havilland Mosquito B.35). This engine was similar to the Merlin 100, fitted with a supercharger rated for higher altitudes. FX901 was capable of 454 mph (730 km/h) at 30,000 ft (9,100 m) and 414 mph (666 km/h) at 40,000 ft (12,200 m).

== Summary of P-51 variants ==
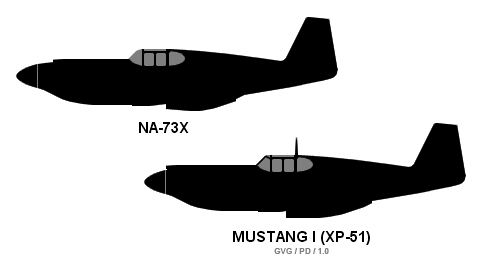

NA-73X
The initial prototype
Mustang Mk I (NA-73/83)

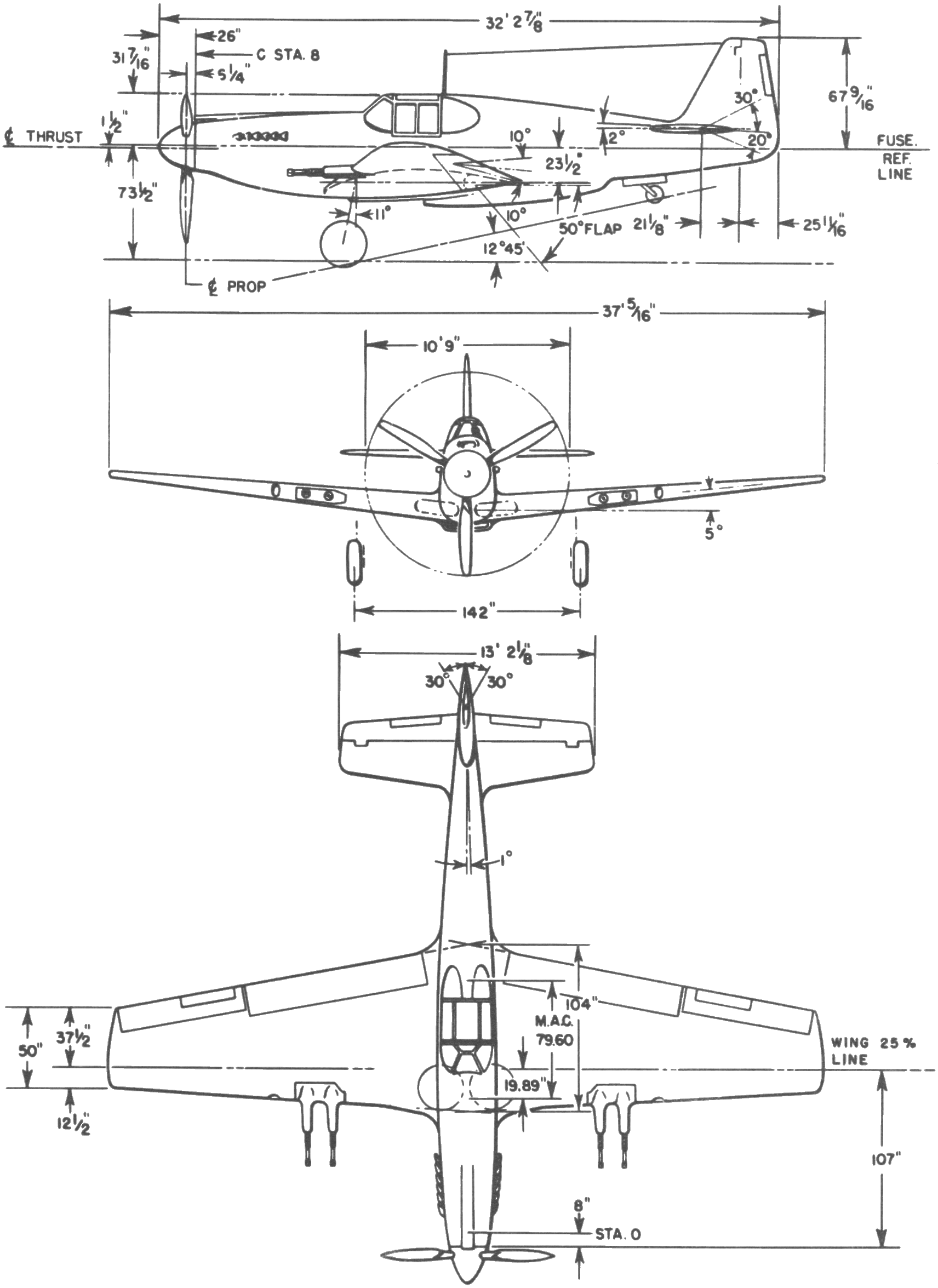
A 3-view line drawing of the North American Mustang IA

The first production contract was awarded by the British for 320 NA-73 fighters. A second British contract for 300 more Mustang Mk Is was assigned a model number of NA-83 by North American. The RAF mostly used its Allison-engined Mustangs as tactical-photo reconnaissance fighters, fitting many of its Mustang Is, IAs, and IIs with camera equipment.
XP-51
Two aircraft of the first production batch, delivered to the USAAF.
P-51 (NA-91)
In September 1940, 150 aircraft were ordered by the USAAF. These were designated by the USAAF as P-51 and initially named the Apache, although this name was dropped early-on for Mustang. The British designated this model as Mustang Mk IA. They were equipped with four long-barrelled 20 mm (.79 in) Hispano Mk II cannon instead of machine guns. Following British practice, a number of aircraft from this lot were fitted out by the USAAF as tactical photo reconnaissance aircraft, designated F-6A.
A-36A (NA-97)
In early 1942, the USAAF ordered a lot of 500 aircraft modified as dive bombers and designated A-36A. This model became the first USAAF Mustang to see combat. One aircraft was passed to the British, who gave it the name Mustang Mk I (Dive Bomber).
P-51A (NA-99)
Following the A-36A order, the USAAF ordered 310 P-51As, fifty of which were delivered to the RAF as Mustang IIs. 35 P-51As were equipped with K-24 cameras and designated F-6B. All these models of the Mustang were equipped with Allison V-1710 engines except the prototype XP-51B.
- P-51A-1-NA, 100 built.
- P-51A-5-NA, 55 built.
- P-51A-10-NA, 155 built.
- F-6B-NA, photo reconnaissance variant. 35 converted from P-51As.

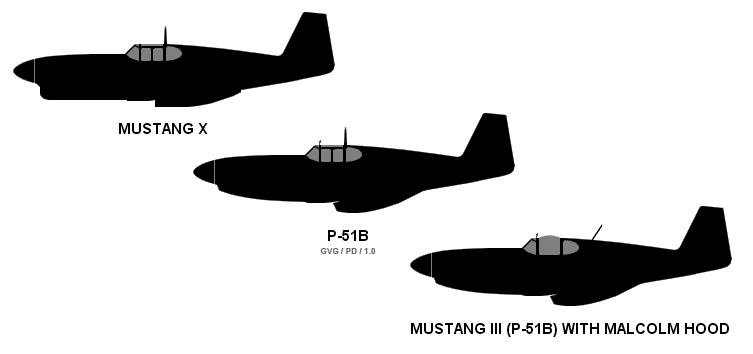

P-51B

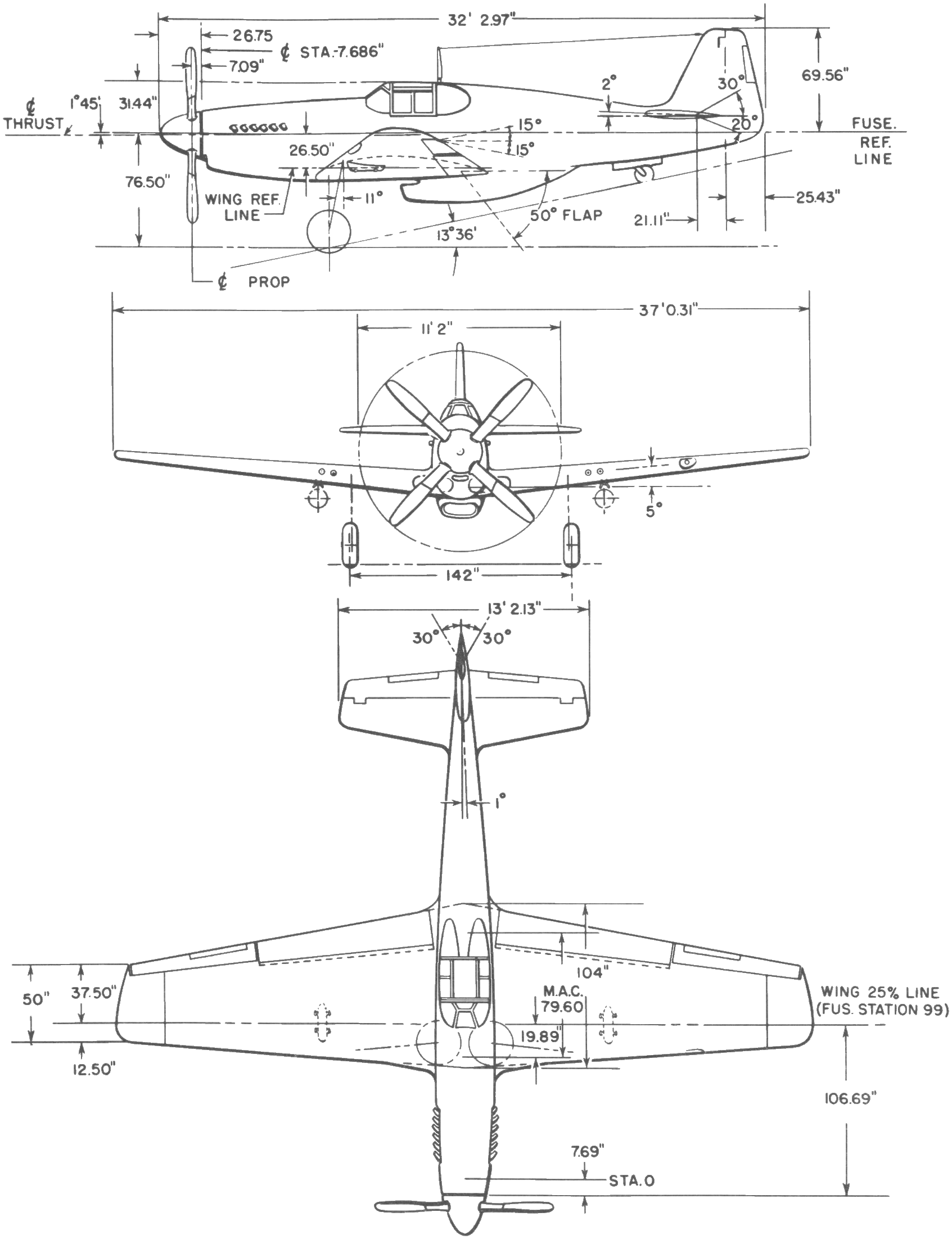
A 3-view line drawing of the North American P-51B Mustang

Beginning with this model the Packard V-1650 replaced the Allison V-1710.
- XP-51B (NA-101), two prototypes converted from P-51s. Originally designated XP-78.
- P-51B-1-NA (NA-102), initial production block with V-1650-3. 400 built.
- P-51B-5-NA (NA-104), with alternate air source grill on each side of the nose. 800 built.
- P-51B-7-NA (NA-104), with 85 gal fuel tank behind the pilot's seat. 550 converted from B-5-NAs.
- P-51B-10-NA (NA-104), with V-1650-7 late in production run. 400 built.
- P-51B-15-NA (NA-104), V-1650-7 as standard. 390 built.
- F-6C-NA, photo reconnaissance conversions.
P-51C
In the summer of 1943, Mustang production was begun at a new plant in Dallas, Texas, as well as at the existing facility in Inglewood, California. The P-51C version mainly used the medium-altitude rated V-1650-7. The RAF named these models Mustang Mk III. 1,750 P-51Cs were built. The RAF also used P-51Bs and Cs, designating them Mustang IIIs.
- P-51C-1-NT (NA-103), initial production block. 350 built.
- P-51C-3-NT (NA-103), same as B-7-NA. Unknown number converted from C-1-NAs.
- P-51C-5-NT (NA-103), same as B-15-NA. 450 built.
- P-51C-10-NT (NA-103/111), 793 built.
- P-51C-11-NT, 127 built.
- F-6C-NT (NA-111), photo reconnaissance conversions.
- TP-51C, two-seat trainer conversions. Five converted in wartime plus another in the early 2000s.
P-51D (NA-109/110/111/122/124)

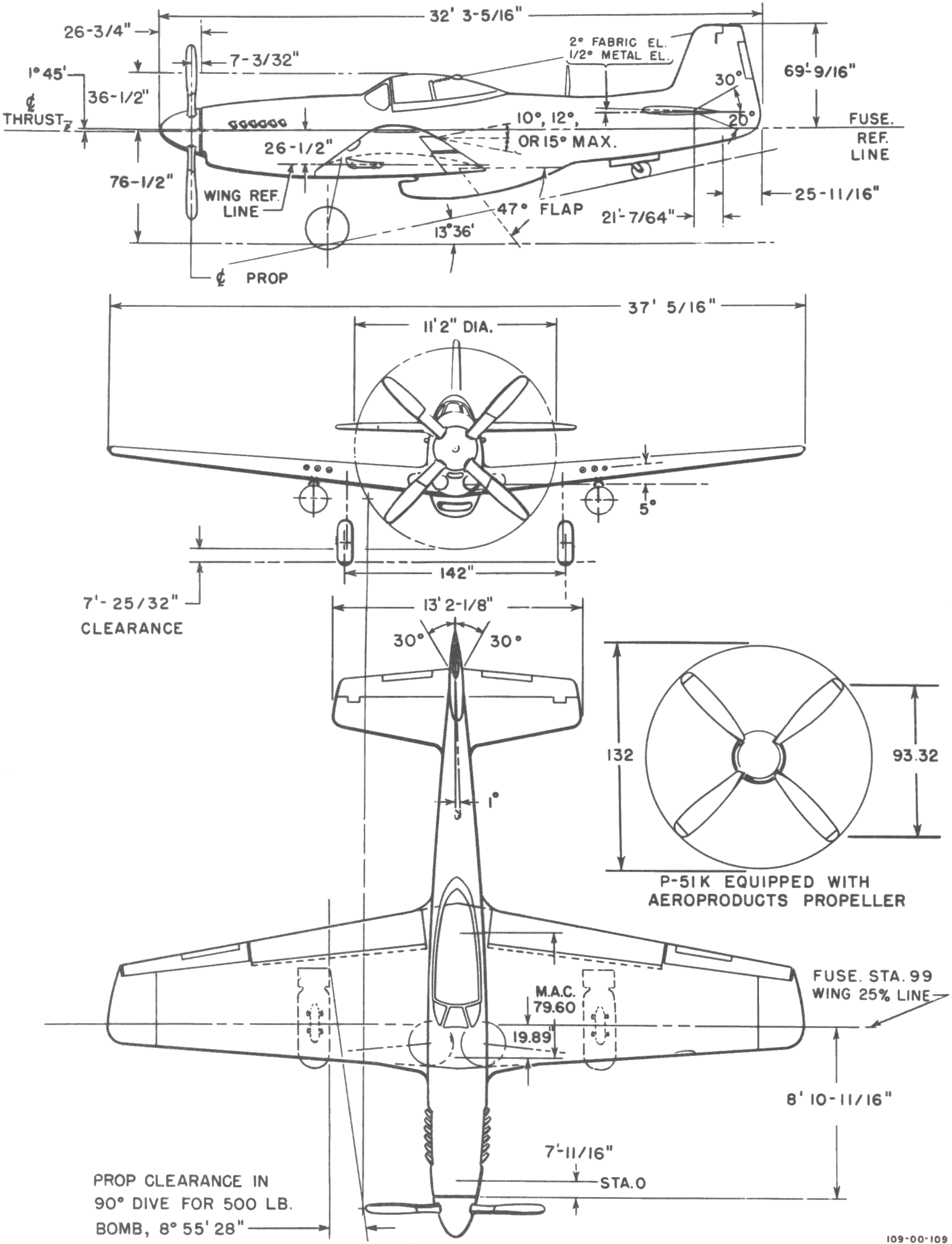
A 3-view line drawing of the North American P-51D Mustang

As well as the modified fuselage and new canopy the production P-51Ds had modified wings compared with the P-51B/C series and became the most widely produced variant of the Mustang, with 6,502 being built at Inglewood and 1,600 at Dallas – a combined total of 8,102. 280 were used by the RAF and designated Mustang Mk IV.
- XP-51D (NA-106), One P-51B-1-NA and two B-10-NAs modified and tested with a cut down rear fuselage and clear-blown canopy structure. Originally designated XP-51D, the designation was later changed to P-51D-NA.
- P-51D-1-NA (NA-110), initial production block of 100 unassembled aircraft sent to Australia. 80 were assembled under the designation CA-17 Mustang Mk 20, while the rest were used for parts. The first four aircraft reportedly had the razorback canopy of the P-51B/C.
- P-51D-5-NA/NT (NA-109/111), initial production block for the USAAF. 800 NA and 200 NT aircraft built.
- P-51D-10-NA (NA-109), with dorsal fin to improve stability (earlier Ds and some B/Cs were modified with this). 800 built.
- P-51D-15-NA (NA-111/122), 900 built.
- P-51D-20-NA/NT (NA-111/122), with K-14 gun sight. 1,600 NA and 400 NT aircraft built.
- P-51D-25-NA/NT (NA-122/124), with underwing racks. 1,600 NA and 800 NT aircraft built.
- P-51D-30-NA/NT (NA-122/124), 800 NA and 200 NT aircraft built.
- F-6D-NA/NT, photo reconnaissance conversions. 147 NA and 136 NT aircraft converted. Later redesignated RF-51D.
- TP-51D, two-seat trainer conversions. Later redesignated TF-51D.
- ETF-51D, prototype for a carrier-based version of the P-51. One modified from a D-5-NA.
- CA-18 Mustang Mk 21, Australian-built variant with V-1650-7. 26 built.
- CA-18 Mustang Mk 22, Australian-built photo reconnaissance variant. 14 converted from Mk 21s and an additional 14 new aircraft built.
- CA-18 Mustang Mk 23, Australian-built variant with Merlin 66 or 70. 66 built.
- CA-21 Mustang Mk 24, planned two-seat trainer variant. Orders canceled.
P-51K (NA-111)
A Dallas-built variation of the P-51D equipped with an Aeroproducts propeller in place of the Hamilton Standard propeller was designated P-51K; 1,500 of these were built. The RAF received 594 P-51Ks and assigned them the name Mustang Mk IVA.
- P-51K-1-NT, initial production block. 200 built.
- P-51K-5-NT, 400 built.
- P-51K-10-NT, similar to D-25-NA/NT. 600 built.
- P-51K-15-NT, 300 built.
- F-6K-NT, photo reconnaissance conversions. 163 converted.
P-51F (NA-105)
As the USAAF specifications required airframe design to a higher load factor than that used by the British for their fighters, consideration was given to re-designing the Mustang to the lower British requirements in order to reduce the weight of the aircraft and thus improve performance. In 1943, North American submitted a proposal to do the re-design as model NA-105, which was accepted by the USAAF. The designation XP-51F was assigned for prototypes powered with V-1650 engines. A small number of P-51Fs were passed to the British as the Mustang Mk V.
P-51G (NA-105)
XP-51G was assigned to those variants with reverse lend/lease Merlin 14.SM engines. Modifications included changes to the cowling, a simplified undercarriage with smaller wheels and disk brakes, and a larger canopy.
P-51J (NA-105)

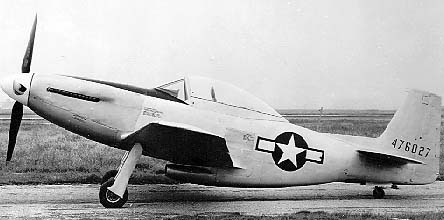
North American XP-51J

A third prototype was added to the development that was powered by an Allison V-1710 engine. This aircraft was designated XP-51J. As the engine was insufficiently developed, the XP-51J was loaned to Allison for engine development.
P-51H
The final production Mustang, the P-51H, embodied the experience gained in the development of the lightweight XP-51F and XP-51G aircraft. This aircraft, model NA-126, and, with minor differences, NA-129, came too late to participate in World War II, but it brought the development of the Mustang to a peak and was one of the fastest production piston-engine fighters to see service. The P-51H used the Merlin V-1650-9 engine, equipped with Simmons automatic boost control and water injection, allowing War Emergency Power as high as 2,270 hp (1,690 kW), and was given a wider-bladed propeller to utilize this power. Some of the weight savings inherited from the XP-51F and XP-51G were invested in lengthening the fuselage and increasing the height of the tailfin, greatly reducing the tendency to yaw, and in restoring the fuselage fuel tank. The canopy was changed back to more nearly resemble the P-51D style, over a somewhat raised pilot's position. Service access to the guns and ammunition was improved. The P-51H was designed to complement the P-47N as the primary aircraft for the invasion of Japan, and 2,000 were ordered to be built at the Inglewood plant. With the solution to the problem of yaw control, the P-51H was now considered a suitable candidate for testing as an aircraft carrier-based fighter; but with the end of the war, the testing was cut short, and production was halted after 555 aircraft were built. Although some P-51Hs were issued to operational units, none saw combat. One aircraft was given to the RAF for testing and evaluation. Serial number 44-64192 was re-serialed as BuNo 09064 and used by the U.S. Navy to test transonic airfoil designs, then returned to the Air National Guard in 1952. The P-51H was not used for combat in the Korean War despite its improved handling characteristics, due to the lack of experience with durability of the lighter airframe under combat conditions as well as limited numbers in the USAF inventory.
- P-51H-1-NA (NA-126), initial production block with short tail of the P-51D. 20 built.
- P-51H-5-NA (NA-126), with tall tail (some H-1s were retrofitted with this tail). 280 built.
- P-51H-10-NA (NA-126), 255 built.
- NA-133, proposed navalized variant with folding wings and wingtip fuel tanks. None built.
P-51L (NA-129)
The Dallas-built version of the P-51H, the P-51L, was to utilize the 2,270 hp (1,690 kW) V-1650-11 engine. Orders for 1,445 aircraft were canceled before any were built.
P-51M (NA-124)
The P-51M-1-NT was based on the P-51D-30-NA/NT, but utilized the V-1650-9A engine lacking water injection and therefore rated for lower maximum power than the -7. One was completed out of the original 1629 ordered, AAF Serial Number 45-11743.
F-51
Redesignation of all P-51s in 1947 in the U.S. Air Force, Air Force Reserve and Air National Guard following establishment of the U.S. Air Force as a separate service.
F-82 Twin Mustang
Very long-range (VLR) development of the Mustang obtained by coupling two highly modified P-51H fuselages to a single wing. First flown in June 1945, it was to be the last American piston-engine fighter ordered into production by the USAF, with 272 built, and was subsequently deployed in the Korean War.
P-51XR

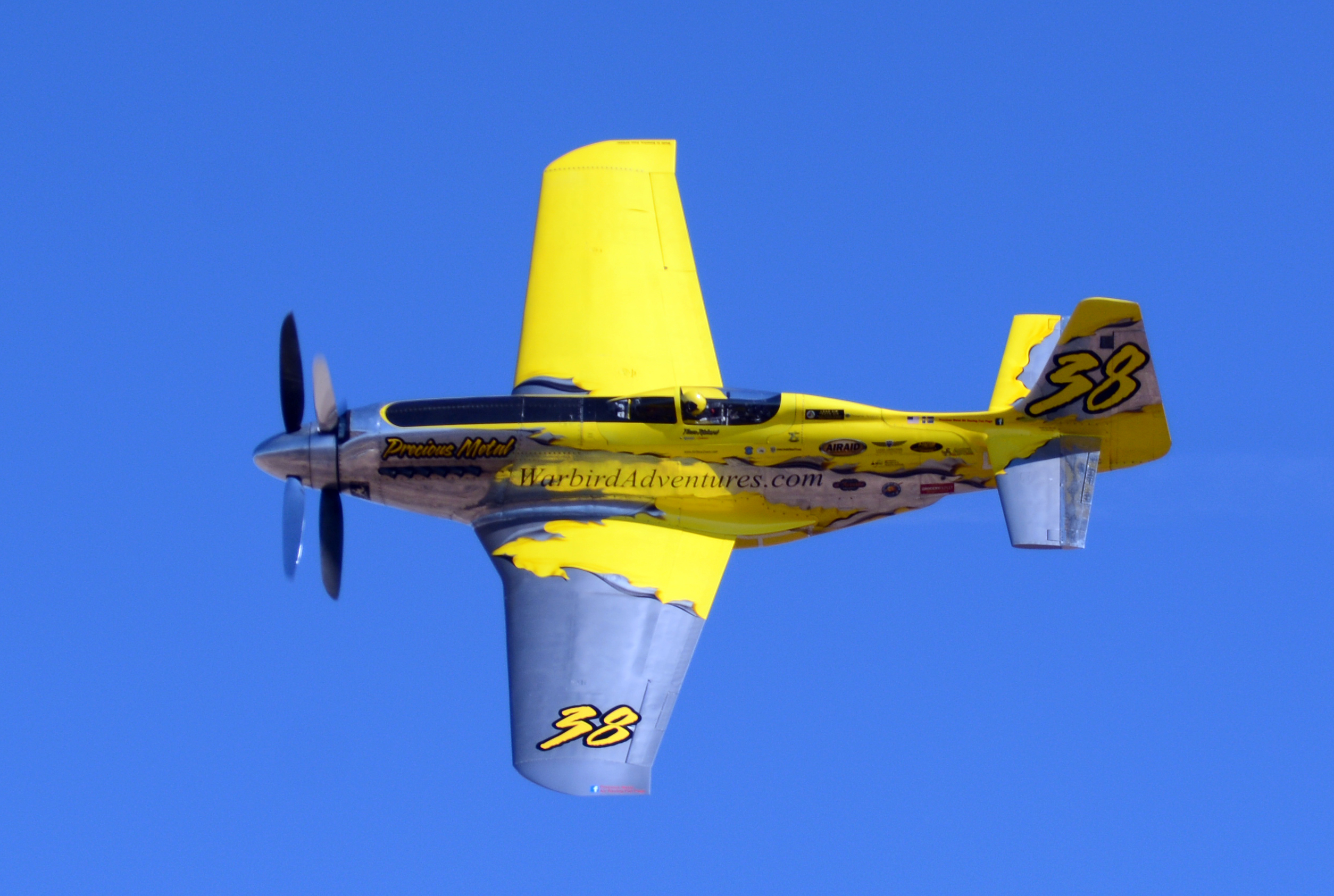
Precious Metal, a modified P-51 air racer, 2014

Designation of the custom-built Reno Air Racer "Precious Metal", which was newly built using parts from various P-51s. Powered by an estimated 3,200 horsepower Griffon. The P-51XR designation, created by the race crew, signifies the specially designed contra-rotating 3-Blade propellers. Precious Metal is the only P-51 of its kind. Two other Griffon powered Mustangs included "Red Baron" (RB-51) and "Miss Ashley II" (P-51R), which has a heavily modified airframe and cockpit, Learjet wings, and an F-86 tail.

Trans-Florida (Cavalier) Executive Mustang
Conversions of P-51Ds into two-seat personal transports.
- Cavalier 750, with approx. range of 750 miles.
- Cavalier 1200, with approx. range of 1,200 miles.
- Cavalier 1500, with approx. range of 1,500 miles.
- Cavalier 2000, with approx. range of 2,000 miles.
- Cavalier 2500, with approx. range of 2,500 miles.

Cavalier F-51D
Re-manufactured P-51Ds for export.
Cavalier Mustang II
Version of the Cavalier F-51D for close air support and counter-insurgency operations.
Piper PA-48 Enforcer

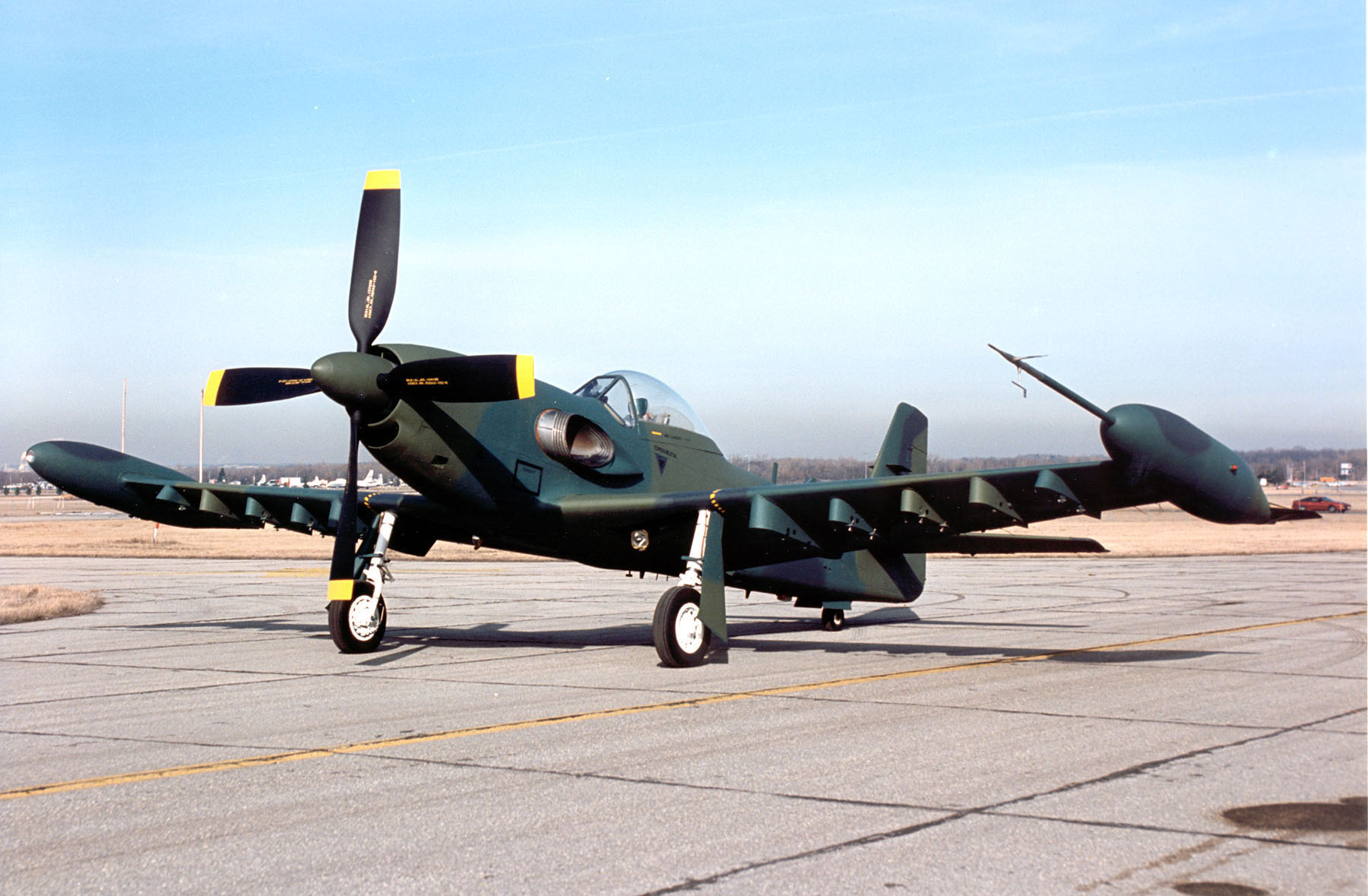
Piper PA48 Enforcer in USAF trials

Losing contender in the Light Armed Reconnaissance Aircraft (LARA) tri-service competition, won by the North American OV-10 Bronco. A highly modified Cavalier modification powered by a Rolls-Royce Dart Mk 510 turboprop engine, it was originally designated Cavalier Turbo Mustang III before the project was taken over by Piper Aircraft.

== Dimensions and performance ==
The basic dimensions of the P-51/A-36 variants remained consistent from the XP-51 through to the experimental "lightweight" P-51s, although there were relatively minor variations in height and wing area. The P-51H was the first production version of the Mustang to feature a lengthened fuselage and taller tailfin.

=== Power ratings ===
The power rating for the engines could vary according to the type of supercharger fitted, the size of the compressor impeller(s), and the gear speeds selected.

In the case of the V-1650, used from the P-51B on, two sets of power ratings can be quoted because these engines were fitted with two-stage, two-speed superchargers; the maximum power generated by the V-1650-3 was 1,490 hp (1,110 kW; 1,510 PS) at the critical altitude of 13,750 ft (4,190 m) in low blower using 61 in (1,500 mm) of mercury (61" Hg) "boost". The "boost" is the pressure to which the air–fuel mixture is compressed before being fed through to the engine's cylinders (manifold pressure). Because air pressure and air density decrease with altitude, the efficiency of a piston engine drops because of the reduction in the amount of air that can be drawn into the engine; for example, the air density at 30,000 ft (9,100 m) is ⅓ of that at sea level, thus only ⅓ of the amount of air can be drawn into the cylinder and only ⅓ of the fuel can be burnt.

In the case of the Mustang the air being forced through the supercharger air intake was first compressed by the supercharger's first stage, or low blower. The intercooler stopped the compressed mixture from becoming too hot and either igniting before reaching the cylinders or creating a condition known as knocking.

Two-stage refers to the use of two impellors (Note: Impellors were often referred to as "blowers" in American parlance.) on a common driveshaft in effect constituting two superchargers in series; a Bendix-Stromberg pressure carburetor injected fuel at 5 psi (34 kPa) through a nozzle direct into the supercharger where the first-stage impellor compressed the air/fuel mixture. This was then fed to the smaller second-stage impellor which further compressed the mixture. The impellors were driven by a hydraulically operated two-speed gearbox. At low to medium altitudes, the supercharger was in 'low blower' (this referred to the speed at which the impellors were operating). Once the aircraft reached and climbed through the set critical altitude (20,000 ft (6,100 m) for the -3) the power would start to drop as the atmospheric pressure, hence the weight of air dropped. As the critical altitude was passed a pressure-operated aneroid capsule operated the gearbox which changed up to 'high blower', driving the impellors faster, compressing a greater volume of the air-fuel mixture. (Note: The second stage starting was often accompanied by a noticeable jolt, which inexperienced pilots often mistook for some type of engine malfunction.) This second stage blower required approximately 200 hp (150 kW; 200 PS) to drive it. As a result, the maximum power generated by the V-1650-3 in 'high blower' was 1,210 hp (900 kW; 1,230 PS) at 25,800 ft (7,900 m), using 61" Hg.

The V-1650-7 used in later P-51B/Cs and in the P-51D/K produced slightly more power but, because of the use of slightly different gear ratios for the impellers, the critical altitude ratings of the supercharger stages were lower, 8,500 ft (2,600 m) and 21,400 ft (6,500 m), respectively, since experience showed most air-to-air combat over Europe was taking place between these altitudes.

The power of the engine could also change according to the octane rating of the aviation fuel being used. Higher octane fuels allowed boost pressures to be increased without the risks of pre-ignition or knocking.

Rather than use inches of mercury, the British measured boost pressure in psi. A reading of +6 meant the air/fuel mix was being compressed to 20.7 psi (6 psi more than one atmosphere) before entering the engine; +25 meant the air/fuel mix was being compressed to 39.7 psi.

Conversion of inches of mercury to lb boost
Inches of mercury (" Hg)	Pounds of boost (lb boost)
80.9	25
66.6	18
60.5	15
48.3	9
42.2	6

=== Reliability of performance figures ===
When reading performance figures it should always be borne in mind that weight, the aerodynamic drag generated by different external fittings, the condition of the airframe and/or engine, and all sorts of other factors could influence how an aircraft performed. For example, the P-51's laminar flow wings needed to be kept as clean and smooth as possible; even relatively minor damage on the wing leading edges could drastically reduce top speed. The most accurate performance figures for the P-51 came from tests carried out at facilities such as the USAAF's Flight Test Engineering Branch, based at Wright Field near Dayton, Ohio and, for the RAF, the Aeroplane & Armament Experimental Establishment (A&AEE), based at Boscombe Down. North American Aviation carried out their own performance tests, as did the only other manufacturer of the P-51, the Commonwealth Aircraft Corporation (CAC) of Australia.

== See also ==
- Pilot William Overstreet Jr., who flew a P-51 under the Eiffel Tower during a WWII dogfight
