= Cavalier Aircraft =

Florida based aircraft manufacturer

Cavalier Aircraft Corporation was a Sarasota, Florida, aircraft manufacturing, sales, and maintenance company whose most famous products were refurbished P-51D Mustangs known as "Cavalier Mustangs."

== Origins ==
The company was originally formed in 1957 by Florida newspaperman David Lindsay (1922–2009) and named Trans Florida Aviation. Trans Florida specialized in modifying surplus North American P-51 Mustangs into plush business aircraft called Executive Mustangs. Later, the aircraft were renamed Cavalier Mustangs and were produced in several different versions: Cavalier 750, 1500, and 2000 (the numbers indicating the approximate range of the aircraft in statute miles). Trans Florida marketed and sold these aircraft, trained the new owners to fly them, and maintained them for customers after purchase. Lindsay also accumulated an immense stockpile of P-51 spare parts and sold these to Mustang owners worldwide. Many of the spares and entire aircraft were purchased from scrap dealers intending to melt them down. Lindsay also developed and received FAA approval for several improvements to the P-51D including: avionics, autopilot, baggage door, fresh air system, rear passenger seat, additional wing bladder tanks, high pressure oxygen system, and wingtip tanks of 110 US gallons (420 L; 92 imp gal).

The original builder of the Mustang, North American Aviation, purchased two Cavaliers for famed test pilot R.A. "Bob" Hoover, one in 1962 and the other in 1971 to use to promote the NAA name at airshows.

In 1967 the company was renamed Cavalier Aircraft Corporation due to the strong product identity of the Cavalier Mustang.

== Military contracts ==
In 1965 the company was contracted in by the government of the Dominican Republic, with US State Dept. approval, to inspect and perform necessary repairs to 36 aircraft in Sarasota. In 1967 the Air Force contracted with Cavalier to create military-capable Cavalier Mustangs that would be provided to friendly countries as part of the U.S. Military Assistance Program. These aircraft were called the Cavalier F-51D Mustang, and the Cavalier TF-51D Mustang. Cavaliers of these types were supplied between 1967 and 1969, via the Air Force, to Bolivia, and directly to El Salvador, with spare parts and maintenance assistance also provided to Guatemala. Modifications varied, but included: vertical fin extension of 14 inches (36 cm), addition wing hard points, avionics upgrades, increased engine power, and wing tip tanks. Cavaliers were also constructed for Indonesia as part of a similar U.S. Military Assistance Program, called Peace Pony, in 1971 by Field Services, Inc.

== The Enforcer ==
In 1968, Cavalier owner/founder David Lindsay began developing a highly modified version of the Cavalier Mustang ll for use as a counterinsurgency aircraft called the Enforcer. Powered by a Rolls-Royce Dart and later a Lycoming YT-55-9 turboprop of 2,300 hp (1,700 kW), the aircraft had impressive performance and was equipped with Bristol ceramic armour to protect the engine, airframe, and pilot. Despite Cavalier's best efforts, they were unable to secure a government purchase of the aircraft. Due to the limited manufacturing capabilities of Cavalier Aircraft Corporation, Lindsay sold the Enforcer project to Piper in late 1970. Cavalier was closed in 1971 so the founder/owner, David Lindsay, could help continue develop the Enforcer concept with Piper Aircraft into the PA-48 Enforcer.

== Today ==
Many of the civilian Cavalier conversions are still flying today. Several of the military Cavaliers have been re-imported to the US. Most have been restored to appear as WWII or Korean era P-51s, but retain many of their Cavalier improvements.
