= Piper PA-48 Enforcer =

American turboprop-powered light close air support aircraft

PA-48 Enforcer
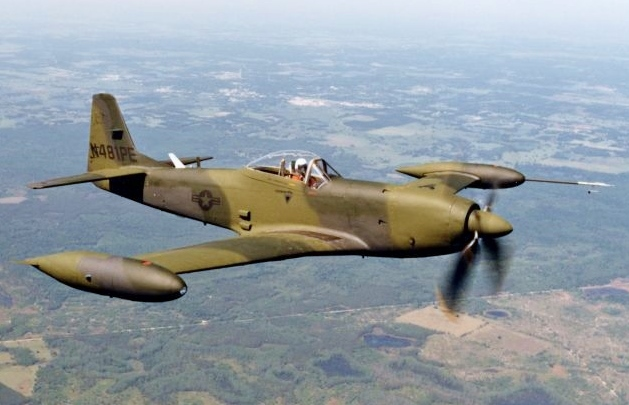

General information
- Type: Counter-insurgency aircraft
- National origin: United States
- Manufacturer: Piper Aircraft
- Status: Retired
- Number built: 4

History
- First flight: 29 April 1971
- Retired: 1984
- Developed from: North American P-51 Mustang; Cavalier Mustang

The Piper PA-48 Enforcer is an American turboprop-powered light close air support aircraft built by Piper in the 1970s. It is a development of the World War II-era North American P-51 Mustang fighter. The Enforcer concept was originally created and flown as the Cavalier Mustang by David Lindsay, owner of Cavalier Aircraft, in response to the United States Air Force PAVE COIN program, but Cavalier did not have the manufacturing abilities to mass-produce the Enforcer, so the program was sold to Piper by Lindsay in 1970.

== Design and development ==
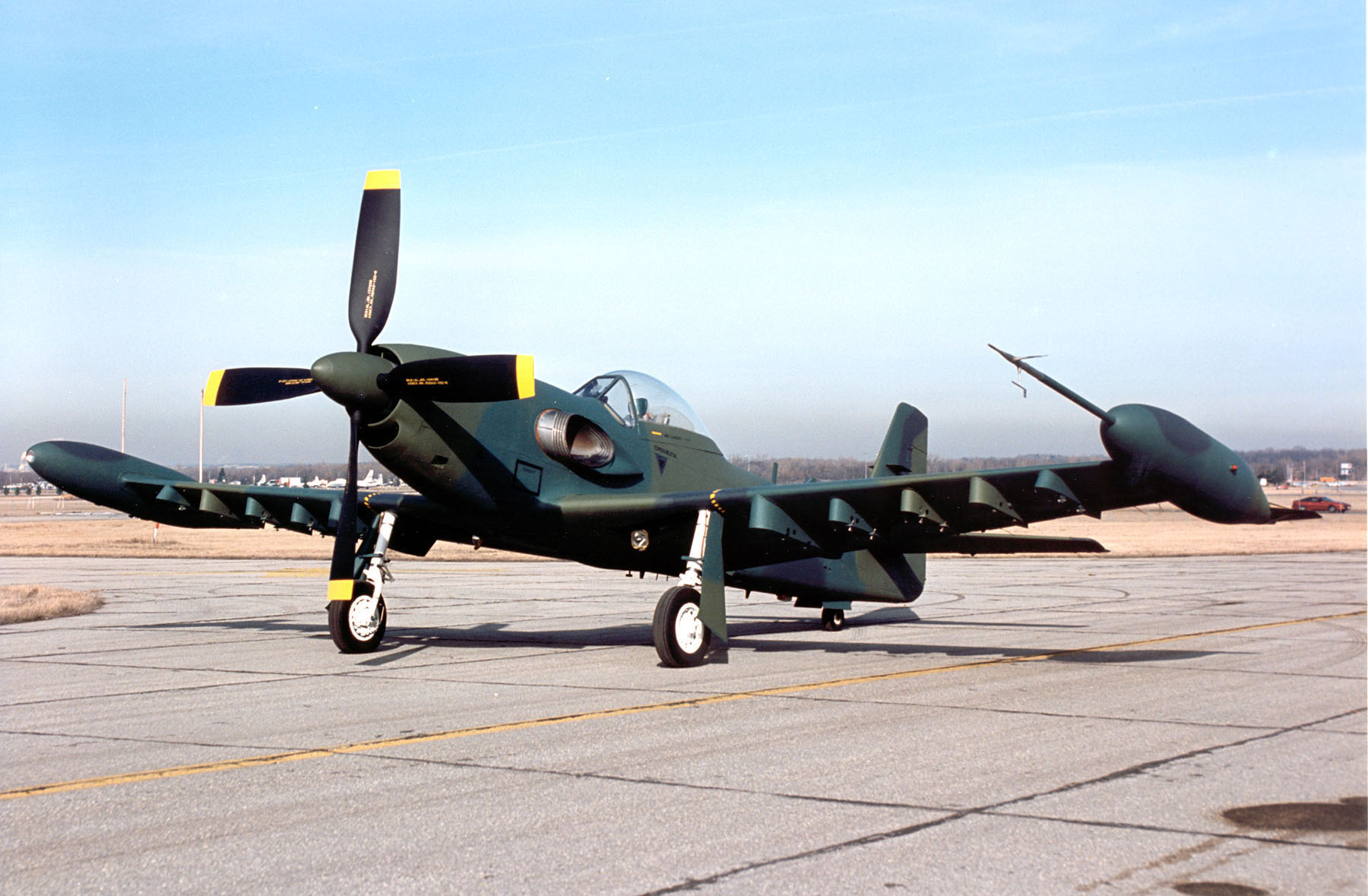
Piper PA-48 Enforcer in USAF trials

In 1968, Cavalier Aircraft owner/founder David Lindsay began developing a highly modified version of the Cavalier Mustang for use as a counter-insurgency aircraft. Cavalier initially mated a Rolls-Royce Dart 510 turboprop to a Mustang II airframe. This privately funded prototype was also intended for the same CAS/COIN mission that the Mustang II was built for. The Turbo Mustang III had radically increased performance, along with an associated increase in payload and decrease in cost of maintenance, and was equipped with Bristol ceramic armor to protect the engine, airframe, and pilot. Despite numerous sales attempts to the United States Air Force, neither the U.S. military nor any foreign operators purchased the Turbo Mustang III.

Seeking a company with mass production capability, the Turbo Mustang III, renamed the "Enforcer", was sold to Piper Aircraft in late 1970. Cavalier Aircraft Corp. was closed in 1971 so the founder/owner, David Lindsay, could help continue develop the Enforcer concept with Piper. Piper was able to lease a Lycoming T55-L-9 engine from the USAF (the engine Lindsay wanted initially) and flew the aircraft some 200+ hours.

In 1971, Piper built two Enforcers by heavily modifying two existing Mustang airframes, fitting them with Lycoming YT55-L-9A turboprop engines along with numerous other significant modifications. One airframe was a single seat (called the PE-1 and FAA registered as N201PE), the other a dual-control aircraft (the PE-2, registered N202PE). Prior to the Pave COIN evaluation, N202PE was lost in a crash off the Florida coast on 12 July 1971 due to flutter caused by a Piper-modified elevator trim tab. Although the Enforcer performed well in the 1971–1972 Pave COIN test flown by USAF pilots, Piper failed to secure a USAF contract.

In 1984, with a $US12 million appropriation from Congress, Piper built two new Enforcers, giving the new prototypes the designation PA-48. These aircraft were evaluated by the USAF, but flown only by Piper test pilots.

== Flight testing and evaluation ==
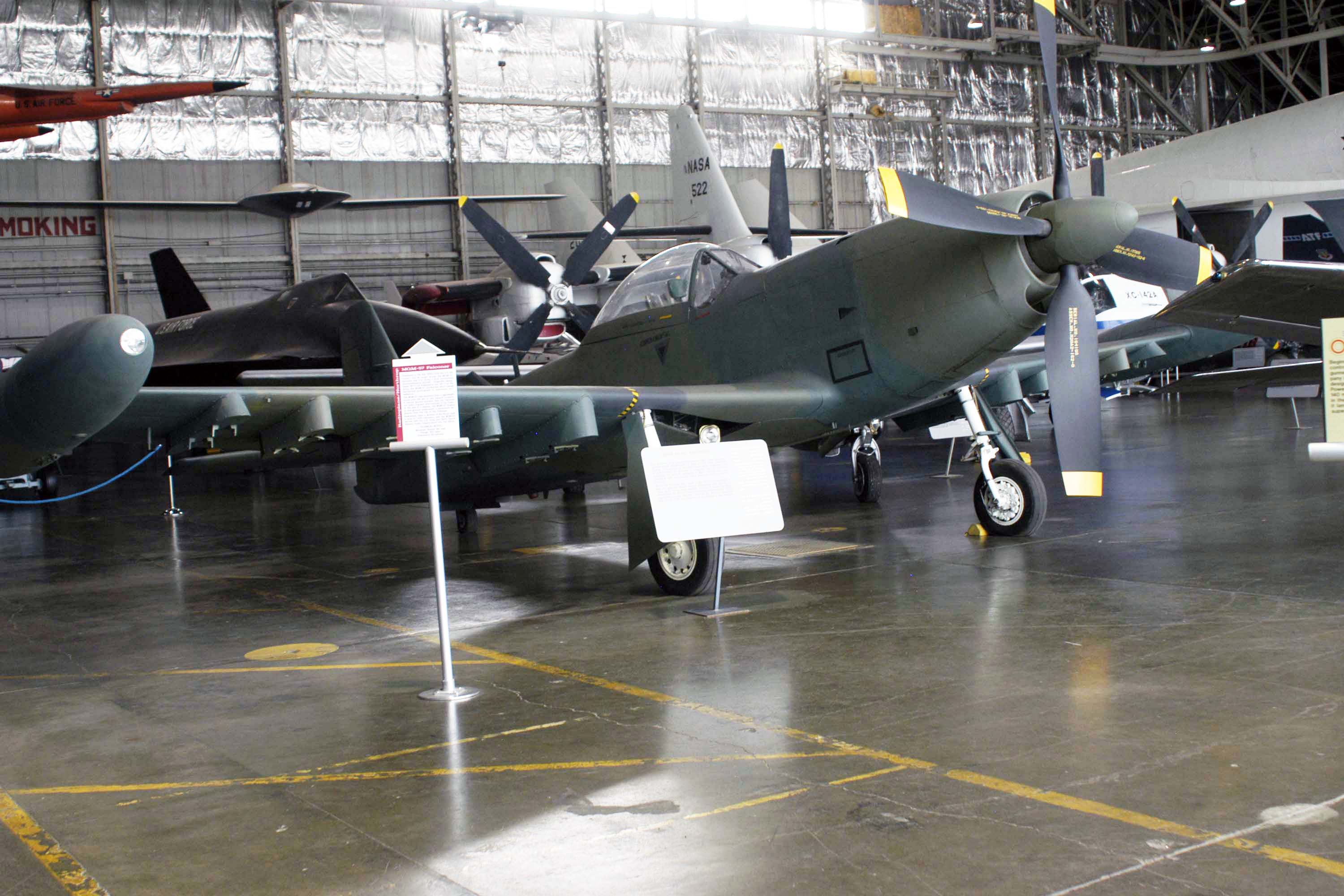
Piper PA-48 Enforcer in the Research & Development Gallery at the National Museum of the U.S. Air Force

For another eight years, Piper and Lindsay lobbied Congress to force the Air Force to officially re-evaluate the Enforcer. Eventually in the 1979 defense bill $11.9 million was allocated for Piper to build two new prototypes and for the Air Force to perform another flight evaluation. Since the Enforcer was never in the Air Force inventory, it was not given an official military designation and did not receive a serial number. Instead, it carried the Piper designation PA-48 and the FAA registration numbers N481PE and N482PE.

By the time the PA-48s were completed, they shared less than 10 percent of their structure with the P-51, and were longer and larger. The PA-48 Enforcer was a completely new aircraft.

The two PA-48s were tested during 1983 and 1984 at Eglin Air Force Base, Florida, and Edwards Air Force Base, California. As in the Pave COIN tests of 1971, the PA-48s were found to perform well in their intended role, but the Air Force again decided not to purchase the aircraft.

== Surviving aircraft ==
Of the four prototype aircraft produced, two still exist. In 2014, PA-48 N482PE completed restoration and is on display at the Air Force Flight Test Museum at Edwards Air Force Base. N481PE has been fully restored and is currently at the Pima Air and Space Museum, Tucson Arizona after being displayed at the National Museum of the United States Air Force, Wright-Patterson Air Force Base, Dayton, Ohio.

== Specifications (PA-48) ==
Data from Jane's All The World's Aircraft 1982–83;

General characteristics

- Crew: One
- Length: 34 ft 2 in (10.41 m)
- Wingspan: 41 ft 4 in (12.60 m) (including tip tanks)
- Height: 8 ft 9 in (2.67 m)
- Wing area: 245 sq ft (22.8 m^{2})
- Empty weight: 7,200 lb (3,266 kg)
- Gross weight: 7,885 lb (3,577 kg) (operating weight)
- Max takeoff weight: 14,000 lb (6,350 kg)
- Fuel capacity: 424 US gal (353 imp gal; 1,610 L) internal fuel;
- Powerplant: 1 × Lycoming YT55-L-9 turboprop, 2,445 shp (1,823 kW) (eshp)
- Propellers: 4-bladed Aeroproducts propeller, 11 ft 6 in (3.51 m) diameter

Performance

- Maximum speed: 345 mph (555 km/h, 300 kn) at 15,000 ft (4,570 m)
- Cruise speed: 253 mph (407 km/h, 220 kn)
- Stall speed: 114 mph (183 km/h, 99 kn)
- Never exceed speed: 402 mph (647 km/h, 349 kn)
- Combat range: 460 mi (740 km, 400 nmi) (combat radius)
- Service ceiling: 25,000 ft (7,600 m)
- Rate of climb: 2,500 ft/min (13 m/s)

Armament

- Hardpoints: ten with a capacity of 5,680 lb (2,580 kg) total

== See also ==
- Boeing Skyfox

Related development

- North American P-51 Mustang
- Cavalier Mustang

Aircraft of comparable role, configuration, and era

- Embraer EMB 312 Tucano
- Beechcraft QU-22 Pave Eagle
- Embraer EMB 314 Super Tucano
- Pilatus PC-9

Related lists

- List of military aircraft of the United States
