= Cavalier Mustang =

American business aircraft

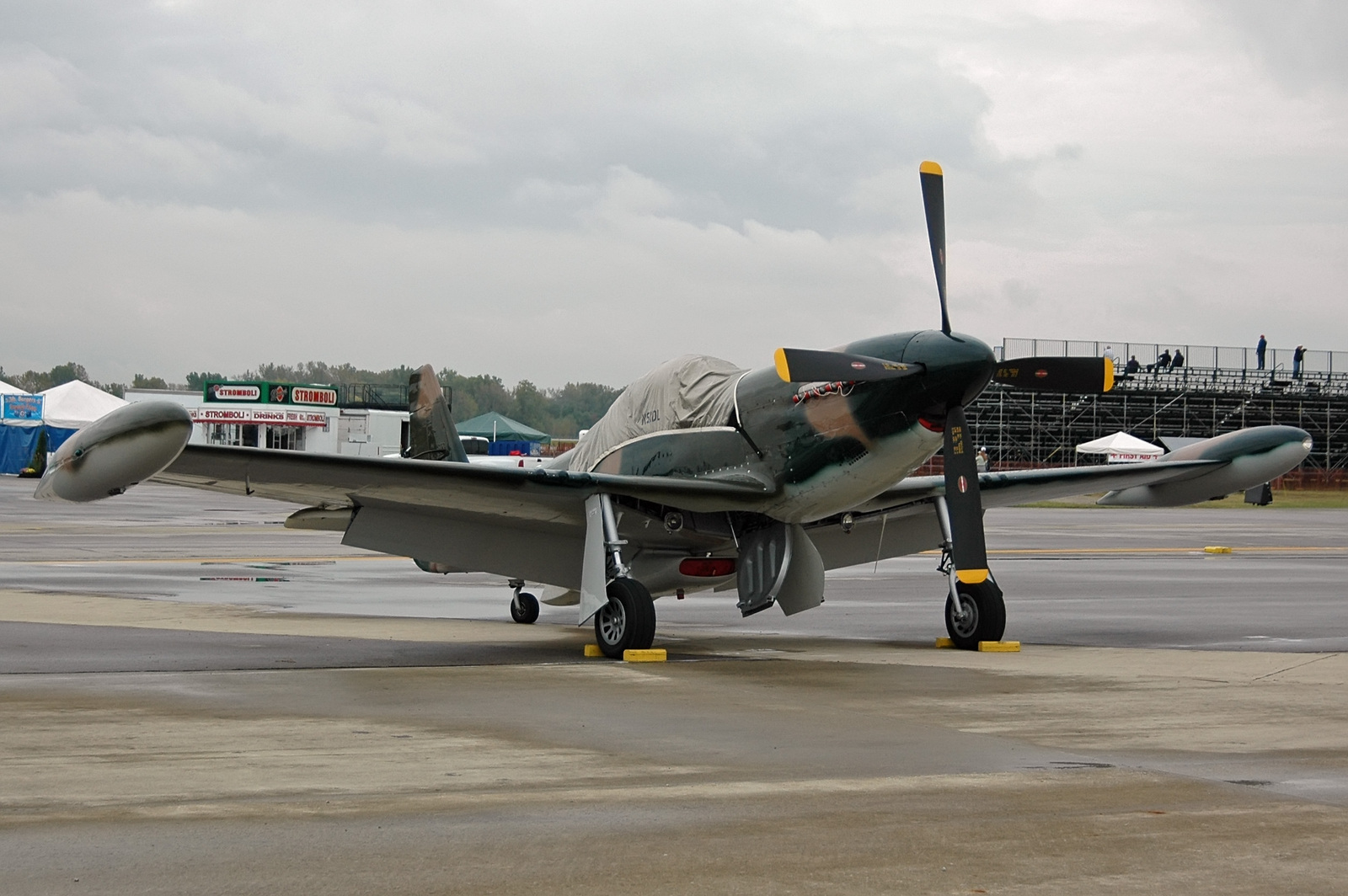
- Cavalier Mustang ll prototype (44-13257, NACA 108)

General information
- Type: Business aircraft Counter-insurgency aircraft
- Manufacturer: Cavalier Aircraft Corp.
- Status: Retired
- Number built: 25+

History
- First flight: 1958
- Retired: 1984
- Developed from: North American P-51 Mustang
- Variant: Piper PA-48 Enforcer

The Cavalier Mustang was a post-World War II civilian-modified version of the North American P-51 Mustang aircraft. Although originally intended as a high speed personal aircraft, the Cavalier was also exported for use as a fighter and close air support aircraft to third-world air forces.

== Development ==
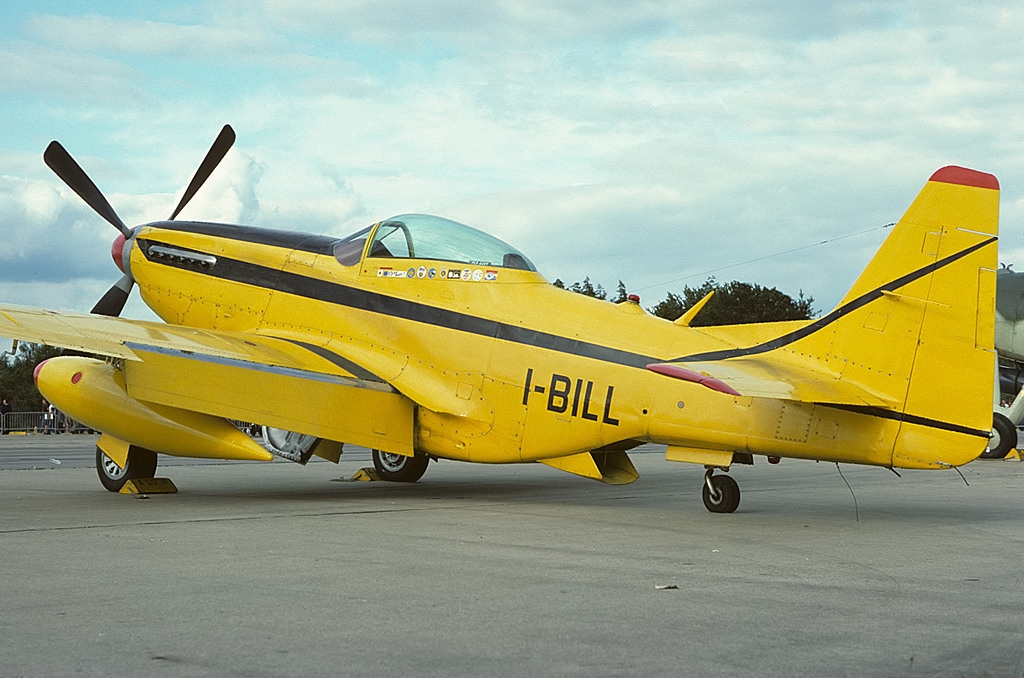
Cavalier 2000

In 1957, newspaper publisher David Lindsay (1922–2009) founded Trans Florida Aviation Inc. His intention was to transform surplus military P-51s into executive business aircraft. These aircraft were initially called the Trans-Florida Executive Mustang, soon renamed the Trans Florida Aviation Cavalier Mustang. The first of the Executive Mustangs was built in 1958 and for the next few years, only a handful of airframes were built and sold.

To construct the Executive Mustang, Trans Florida purchased military surplus P-51s. The airframes were completely disassembled, the military equipment stripped out, and then rebuilt with a second seat, new avionics, plush leather interiors, luggage bays, and civilian paint schemes. By 1961, the tip-tank equipped aircraft were renamed Cavalier 2000, referring to its 2000 mi (3200 km) range. Five different Cavalier models were eventually offered: the Cavalier 750, 1200, 1500, 2000, and 2500, differing in fuel capacity, with the name indicating the approximate range of the aircraft in miles. Over the course of the next decade, nearly 20 of these aircraft would be constructed. Several FAA approved modifications to the Cavalier design would be made during that time, including canopy frame mounted cockpit fresh air vents, 96-US-gallon (360 L; 80 imp gal) wingtip fuel tanks, fuselage baggage door, 60 gallon ammo/gun bay fuel tanks, autopilot and a 14-inch (360 mm) taller vertical stabilizer.

Between 1964 and 1965, Trans Florida completed an IRAN inspection of over 30 F-51Ds of the Dominican Air Force (FAD) in Sarasota.

In 1967 the company was renamed Cavalier Aircraft Corporation.

== Military Cavaliers ==
=== Cavalier F-51D ===
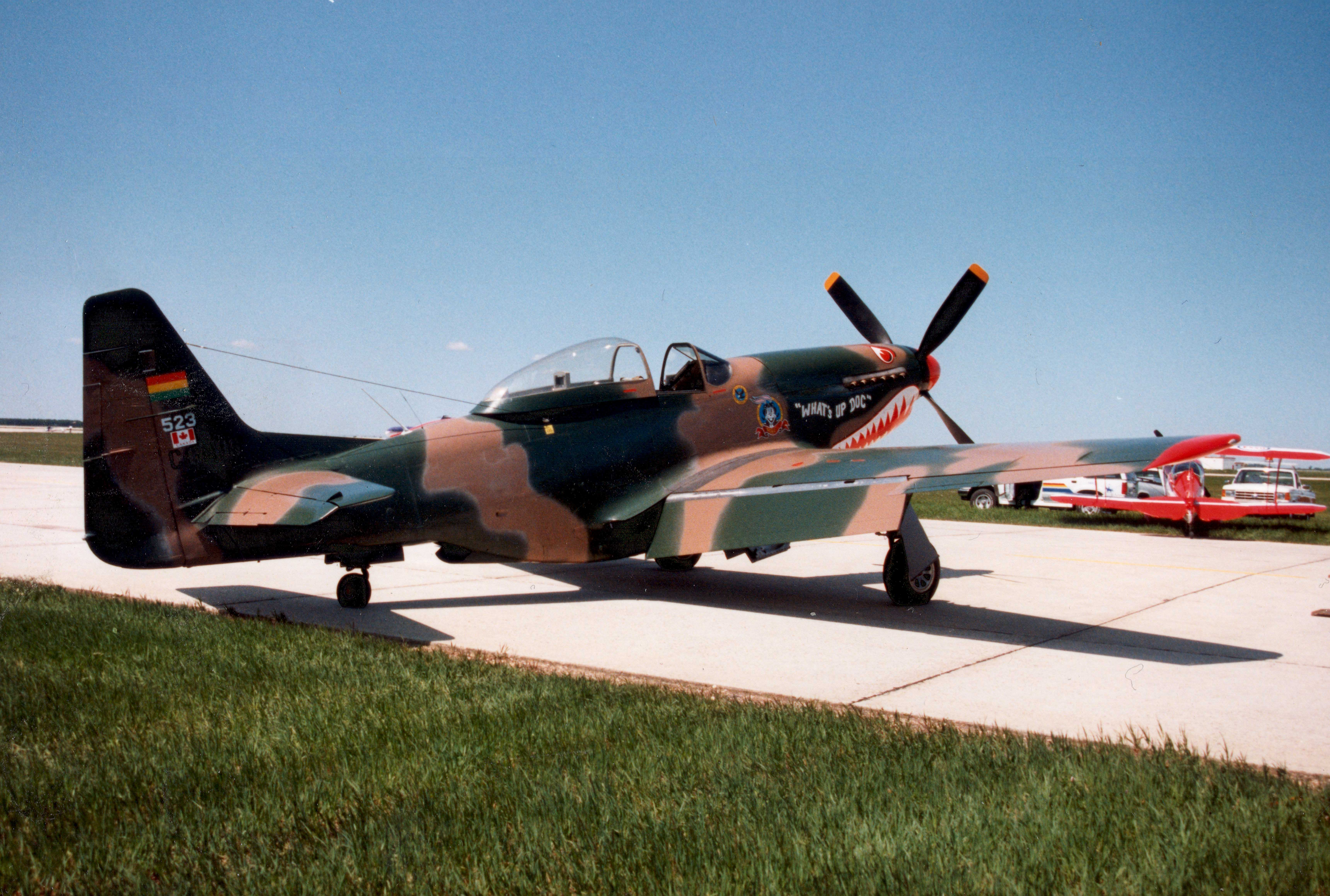
Cavalier F-51D, formerly of the Bolivian Air Force

In 1967, a decade after creating their first civilian P-51 conversion, Trans Florida was contracted by the United States Department of Defense to create military specification F-51Ds for export. These military aircraft incorporated most of the improved features of the civilian Cavaliers but were optimized as ground attack fighters. These aircraft were called Cavalier F-51D Mustangs; nine single control (F-51D) and two dual-control (TF-51D) aircraft were built. The aircraft were given new 67-XXXXX and 68-XXXXX serial numbers. Nine (including the two TF-51s) were given to Bolivia, under a program called Peace Condor and two, with tip tanks, were sold to the United States Army for use as chase aircraft, one of which is preserved at the Air Force Armament Museum at Eglin Air Force Base, Florida.

=== Cavalier Mustang II ===
In 1967, Cavalier developed an outgrowth of the F-51D designed for close air support and counter-insurgency operations, calling this aircraft the Cavalier Mustang II. The Mustang II had improved avionics, structural improvements to the wing to allow more external weapons carriage on four additional hardpoints, and an improved Rolls-Royce Merlin V-1650-724A engine.

Two batches of Mustang IIs were constructed: the first group was built for El Salvador in 1968 and the second group was constructed for export to Indonesia in 1972 and 1973. The five Mustang IIs (including one TF-51D) built for El Salvador featured wingtip fuel tanks to increase combat range. Five Mustang IIs and one TF-51D were built for Indonesia in 1972, but they did not have tip tanks due to a U.S. State Department restriction on their combat radius.

=== Cavalier Turbo Mustang III/ Enforcer ===
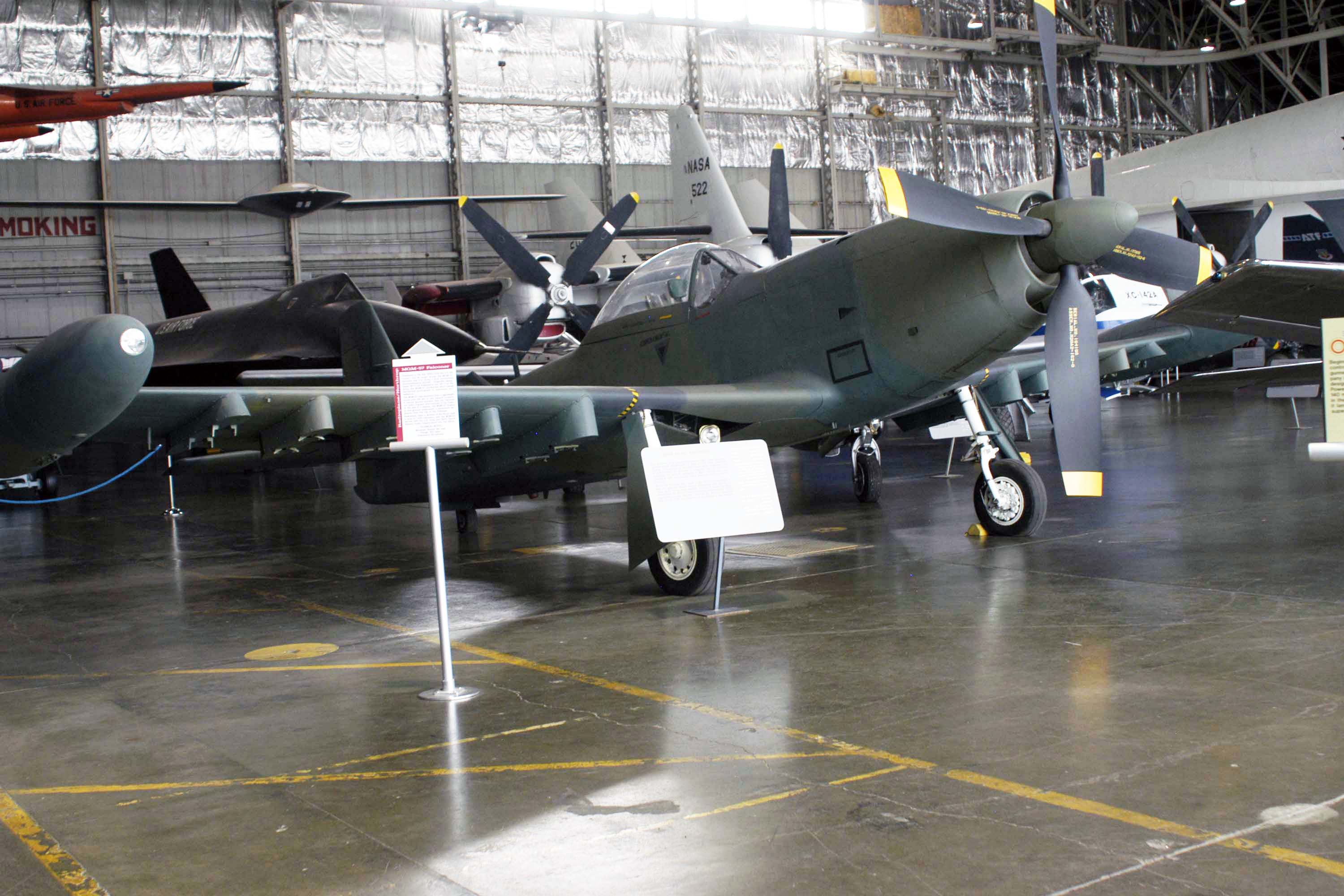
Piper PA48 Enforcer in the Research & Development Gallery at the National Museum of the U.S. Air Force

In 1968, Cavalier mated a Rolls-Royce Dart 510 turboprop to a Mustang II airframe. This privately funded prototype was also intended for the same CAS/COIN mission that the Mustang II was built for. The Turbo Mustang III had radically increased performance, along with an associated increase in payload and decrease in cost of maintenance due to the turbine engine. Despite numerous sales presentations to the United States Air Force, neither the U.S. military nor any foreign operators purchased the Turbo Mustang III. Seeking a company with mass production capability, the Turbo Mustang project, now called "The Enforcer," was sold by Lindsay to Piper Aircraft in 1971.

Cavalier Aircraft Corp. was closed in 1971 so the founder/owner, David Lindsay, could help develop the Piper PA-48 Enforcer. Lindsay set up a new company, Field Services Inc., to complete a USAF Cavalier Mustang II contract, called "Peace Pony", for Indonesia. Many of the civil Mustang conversions, as well as many re-imported former military Cavaliers, have been restored into P-51Ds and fly on the U.S. and European air show circuits today.

== Specifications (Cavalier F-51D) ==
General characteristics

- Crew: One
- Length: 34 ft 2 in (10.40 m)
- Wingspan: 41 ft 4 in (12.60 m) (with tip tanks)
- Height: 13 ft 1 in (4.00 m)
- Wing area: 408 sq ft (37.9 m^{2})
- Gross weight: 12,000 lb (6,350 kg)
- Powerplant: 1 × Rolls-Royce Merlin 724 liquid-cooled V-12, 1,720 shp (1,831 kW)
- Propellers: 4-bladed Hamilton Standard hydromatic

Performance

- Maximum speed: 440 mph (708 km/h, 380 kn)
- Range: 2,000 mi (3,218 km, 1,700 nmi)
- Service ceiling: 41,000 ft (11,465 m)
- Rate of climb: 2,400 ft/min (12 m/s)
- Wing loading: 34 lb/sq ft (167 kg/m^{2})
- Power/mass: 0.18 hp/lb (0.29 kW/kg)

Armament

- Six underwing hardpoints for a variety of stores and 6 0.50 cal (12.7 mm) machine guns

== See also ==
Related development

- North American P-51 Mustang
- Piper PA-48 Enforcer

Aircraft of comparable role, configuration, and era

- Embraer EMB-314 Super Tucano (ALX)
- Pilatus PC-9

Related lists

- List of military aircraft of the United States
